= List of Lycidae genera =

Following is a list of genera known to be a part of the Lycidae: a family in the beetle order Coleoptera. Members of this family are commonly called net-winged beetles.

== A ==
- Achras Waterhouse, 1879^{bl c w}
- Acantholycus Bourgeois, 1883^{bl c w}
- Acroleptus Bourgeois, 1886^{c w}
- Adoceta Bourgeois, 1882^{c w}
- Aferos Kazantsev, 1992^{bl c w}
- Alyculus Kazantsev, 1999^{bl c w}
- Ambangia Bocakova, 2006^{c w}
- Ambonoides Opitz, 2015^{c w}
- Andepteron Kazantsev, 2017^{c}
- Antennolycus Bocakova & Bocak, 1999^{bl c w}
- Aplatopterus Reitter, 1911^{c}
- Aplopteron Kazantsev, 2017^{c}
- Aspitonis Opitz, 2015^{c w}
- Atamania Kazantsev, 2004^{bl c w}
- Atelius Waterhouse, 1878^{bl c w}
- Atlanticolycus Nascimento & Bocakova, 2023^{bl c}
- Autaphes Kazantsev, 2004^{bl c w}

== B ==
- Benibotarus Kôno, 1932^{bl c w}
- Biphilodes Kazantsev, 2000^{c w}
- Bourgeiosiella Kasantsev, 1992^{c w}
- Brasilycus do Nascimento & Bocáková, 2010^{c w}
- Broxylus Waterhouse, 1879^{bl}
- Bulenides Waterhouse, 1879^{c w}
- Burmolycus† Bocak, Light & Ellenberger, 2019^{bl c}

== C ==
- Caenia Newman, 1838^{bl c w}
- Calcaeron Kazantsev, 2004^{bl c}
- Calochromus Guérin-Ménéville, 1833^{bl c w}
- Calocladon Gorham, 1881^{bl c w}
- Calolycus Gorham, 1881^{bl c w}
- Calopteron Guérin-Méneville, 1830^{bl c w}
- Caloptognatha Green, 1954^{bl c w}
- Cartagonum Pic, 1922^{c w}
- Cautires Waterhouse, 1879^{bl c w}
- Cavoplateros Pic, 1913^{bl c}
- Celiasis Laporte & Brullé, 1840^{c}
- Cephalolycus Pic, 1926^{c}
- Ceratolycus Kazantsev, 2017^{c}
- Ceratoprion Gorham, 1884^{bl c w}
- Ceratopriomorphus Pic, 1922^{bl c w}
- Cerceros Kraatz, 1879^{bl}
- Cessator Kazantsev, 2009^{bl c}
- Chinotaphes Bocák & Bocáková, 1999^{bl c w}
- Chlamidolycus Bourgeois, 1883^{bl c w}
- Chlamydolycus Kleine, 1933^{c w}
- Chuzenjianus Kono, 1932^{c}
- Cladocalon Nascimento & Bocakova, 2022^{bl c w}
- Cladophorus Guérin-Méneville, 1830^{bl c w}
- Coloberos Bourgeois, 1885^{bl c w}
- Concavolycus Marie, 1968^{c w}
- Conderis Waterhouse, 1879^{bl c w}
- Cretolycus† Tihelka, D. Huang & Cai, 2019^{c}
- Currhaeus Nascimento, Bressan & Bocakova, 2020^{bl c w}
- Cyrtopteron Bourgeois, 1905^{c w}

== D ==
- Damzenium† Kazantsev & Bocak, 2022 ^{c} ^{w}
- Dexoris Waterhouse, 1878^{bl c w}
- Diatrichalus Kleine, 1926^{c w}
- Dictyoptera Latreille, 1829^{bl c w}
- Dihammatus C.O. Waterhouse, 1880^{c w}
- Dilolycus Kleine, 1926^{w}
- Dilophotellus Kleine, 1925^{c w}
- Dilophotes Waterhouse, 1879^{bl c w}
- Dilophotis^{c w}
- Ditoneces Waterhouse, 1879^{c w}
- Dominopteron Kazantsev, 2013^{c w}
- Dostaliella† Motyka, Kusy & Bocak, 2025^{c}
- Dracolycus Ferreira & Ivie, 2022^{c}
- Dumbrellia Lea, 1909^{bl c w}

== E ==
- Elgodexoris Bocak & Bocakova, 1987^{bl c w}
- Electropteron† Kazantsev, 2012^{bl w}
- Emplectus Erichson, 1847^{bl c w}
- Eniclases Waterhouse, 1879^{c w}
- Enylus Waterhouse, 1879^{bl c w}
- Eropterus Green, 1951^{c w}
- Eros Newman, 1838^{bl c w}
- Erotides Waterhouse, 1879^{bl c w}
- Eulopheros Kazantsev, 1995^{c w}
- Eulycus Kazantsev, 2018^{c}
- Euplateros Kazantsev, 2011^{bl c w}
- Eurrhacus Waterhouse, 1879^{bl c}
- Eurycerus Dejean, 1833^{c w}

== F ==
- Falsocaenia Pic, 1922^{c w}
- Falsocalleros Pic, 1933^{bl c w}
- Falsoceratoprion Ferreira, 2022^{bl c w}
- Falsolucidota Pic, 1921^{c}
- Falsotrichalus Pic, 1921^{bl c w}
- Flabellocaenia Pic, 1929^{bl}
- Flabellodilophotes Pic, 1912^{c w}
- Flabellotrichalus Pic, 1921^{bl c w}
- Flagrax Kazantsev, 1992^{bl c w}

== G ==
- Gomezzuritus Kazantsev, Motyka Bocak, 2023^{c}
- Gorhamium Nascimento & Bocakova, 2024^{bl c}
- Greenarus Kazantsev, 1995^{bl c w}

== H ==
- Haplobothris Bourgeois, 1879^{bl c w}
- Helcophorus Fairmaire, 1891^{bl c w}
- Hemiconderis Kleine, 1926^{w}
- Hiekeolycus† Bocak et al., 2025 ^{c} ^{w}
- Hololycus Bourgeois, 1888^{bl}

== I ==
- Idiopteron Bourgeois, 1905^{bl c w}

== J ==
- Japanogreenarus Matsuda, 2010^{c w}

== K ==
- Kassemia Bocak, 1998^{c w}
- Kleineria Kazantsev, 2004^{c w}
- Kolibacium† Winkler, 1987 ^{bl c w}
- Konoplatycis† Nakane, 1970^{bl c w}

== L ==
- Lampyrolycus Burgeon, 1937^{bl c}
- Laterialis Kazantsev, 1990^{c w}
- Leptoceletes Green, 1952^{bl c w}
- Leptolycus Leng & Mutchler, 1922^{bl c w}
- Leptotrichalus Kleine, 1925^{c w}
- Libnetis C.O. Waterhouse, 1878^{c w}
- Libnetisia Pic, 1921^{c w}
- Libnetomorphus Pic, 1921^{c w}
- Libnetus Waterhouse, 1878^{bl}
- Lipernes Waterhouse, 1879^{c w}
- Lizhongiella Li, Pang & Bocak, 2017^{c}
- Lobatang Bocak, 1998^{c w}
- Lolodorfus Bocakova, 2014^{bl c w}
- Lopheros LeConte, 1882^{bl c w}
- Lopholycus Bourgeois, 1883^{bl}
- Lucaina Dugès, 1879^{bl c w}
- Lybnopaeus Kasantsev, 1999^{c w}
- Lycinella Gorham, 1884^{c w}
- Lycomesus Zaragoza-Caballero & González-Ramírez, 2019^{c w}
- Lycomorphon Pic, 1922^{c w}
- Lyconotus Green, 1949^{c w}
- Lycoprogentes Pic, 1915^{bl c w}
- Lycoprogenthes Pic, 1915^{c}
- Lycoplateros Pic, 1922^{bl c w}
- Lycorectus Gonzalez-Ramirez & Zaragoza-Caballero, 2025^{c}
- Lycostomus Motschoulsky, 1861^{bl c w}
- Lycus Fabricius, 1787^{bl c w}
- Lygistopterus Mulsant, 1838^{bl c w}
- Lyponia Waterhouse, 1878^{bl c w}
- Lypropaeus^{w}
- Lyrolib Bocakova, 2006^{w}
- Lyroneces Kasantsev, 1999^{c w}
- Lyropaeus Waterhouse, 1878^{bl c w}

== M ==
- Macroambangia Bocakova, 2006^{c w}
- Macrolycinella Pic, 1922^{bl}
- Macrolibnetis Pic, 1938^{c w}
- Macrolycus Waterhouse, 1878^{bl c w}
- Macrolygistopterus Pic, 1929^{bl c w}
- Mangkutanus Kubecek, Dvorak & Bocak, 2011^{bl}
- Marena Kazantsev, 2007^{c w}
- Matsudanoeus Sklenarova, Kubecek & Bocak, 2014^{c w}
- Melampyrus Waterhouse, 1879^{c w}
- Melaneros Fairmaire, 1877^{bl w}
- Merolycus Bourgeois, 1883^{bl}
- Mesolycus Gorham, 1883^{bl c w}
- Mesopteron Bourgeois, 1905^{c w}
- Metanoeus C.O. Waterhouse, 1880^{c w}
- Metapteron Bourgeois, 1905^{bl c w}
- Metrioguinus Kazantsev, 2017^{c}
- Metriorrhynchoides Kleine, 1926^{c w}
- Metriorrhynchus Gemminger & Harold, 1869^{bl c w}
- Microcoloberos Pic, 1913^{bl}
- Microeron Kazantsev, 2004^{bl c w}
- Micronychus Motschoulsky, 1861^{c w}
- Microlyropaeus Pic, 1929^{bl}
- Mimoditonecia Kazantsev, 2002^{c w}
- Mimolibnetis Pic, 1936^{bl c}
- Miniduliticola Kazantsev, 2003^{bl c w}
- Miocaenia Wickham, 1914^{c}
- Murcybolus† Li & Cai in Li et al., 2021^{c} ^{w}

== N ==
- Nanolycus Kazantsev, 2013^{w}
- Neolinoptes Nascimento & Bocakova, 2017^{bl c w}
- Neolycus Bourgeois, 1883^{bl c}
- Neolyrium Kazantsev, 2005^{bl c w}
- Neoplateros Kazantsev, 2006^{bl c w}

== O ==
- Ochinoeus Kubecek, Bray & Bocák, 2015^{c w}
- Oriomum Bocak, 1999^{c w}

== P ==
- Paraplateros Zaragoza, 1999^{bl}
- Paracautires Kazantsev, 2012^{c w}
- Paracroleptus Ferreira, 2020^{c w}
- Paralopheros Kasantsev, 1993^{c w}
- Paralycus Womersley, 1944^{w}
- Parataphes Kleine, 1925^{bl c w}
- Paratelius Kazantsev, 1992^{bl}
- Pendola Bocak, 2002^{c w}
- Petrovia Kazantsev, 2017^{c}
- Phaneros Kazantsev, 1992^{bl c w}
- Picomicrolycus Özdikmen, 2009^{c w}
- Pietrzeniukia† Winkler, 1987^{c w}
- Platerodrilus Pic, 1921^{bl c w}
- Plateromimus Kazantsev, 2006^{bl c w}
- Plateros Bourgeois, 1879^{bl c w}
- Platrilus Kazantsev, 2009^{c w}
- Platycides Kazantsev, 2012^{bl c w}
- Platycis Thomson, 1859^{bl c w}
- Plycus Kazantsev, 2021^{c w}
- Polyneros Kazantsev, 2009^{c w}
- Poniella Kazantsev, 2002^{c}
- Ponyalis Fairmaire, 1900^{bl c w}
- Porrostoma Laporte, 1838^{bl c w}
- Prioceraton Kazantsev, 2013^{c w}
- Procautires Kleine, 1925^{bl c w}
- Prolibnetis Bocakova, 2004^{c w}
- Propyropterus Nakane, 1968^{bl c w}
- Protaphes Kleine, 1926^{c w}
- Proteros Kazantsev, 2004^{c w}
- Proterotaphes Kazantsev, 2006^{bl}
- Protolopheros† Kazantsev, 2013^{bl c}
- Protolycus† Kazantsev, 2019^{bl c}
- Prototrichalus† Molino-Olmedo, Ferreira, Branham & Ivie, 2020^{c}
- Pseudaplatopterus Kleine, 1940^{bl c}
- Pseudacroleptus Pic, 1911^{bl c w}
- Pseudeuplectus Pic, 1922^{c w}
- Pseudoplateros Green, 1951^{c w}
- Pseudoplatopterus Kleine, 1940^{c}
- Pseudosynchonnus Pic, 1922^{c w}
- Punicealis Kazantsev, 1990^{bl c w}
- Pyropterus Mulsant, 1838^{bl c w}
- Pyrotes Kazantsev, 2004^{bl c w}

== R ==
- Rhyncheros Leconte, 1881^{c}
- Rossioptera Kasantsev, 1988^{c}

== S ==
- Scarelus Waterhouse, 1878^{bl c w}
- Schizotrichalus Kleine, 1926^{w}
- Sibetarus Bocak & Bocakova, 1991^{c w}
- Sinodulia Kazantsev, 2003^{bl c w}
- Skrivania Bocakova & Bocak, 1999^{c w}
- Slipinskia Bocakova & Bocak, 1992^{w}
- Spacekia Strand, 1936^{c w}
- Spartoires Kazantsev, 2012^{c w}
- Spinotrichalus Kazantsev, 2010^{c w}
- Stadenus Waterhouse, 1879^{bl c w}
- Staepteron Kazantsev, 1992^{bl c w}
- Stenolycus Ohbayashi, 1956^{c w}
- Sulabanus Dvorak & Bocak, 2007^{c w}
- Sundolyponia Kazantsev, 2002^{c w}
- Synchonnus Waterhouse, 1879^{bl c w}

== T ==
- Tainopteron Kazantsev, 2009^{c w}
- Taphes Waterhouse, 1878^{bl c w}
- Taphomimus Kazantsev, 1996^{bl c w}
- Tapromenoeus Bocak & Bocakova, 1989^{c w}
- Teroplas Gorham, 1884^{bl}
- Thibeteros Kazantsev, 2015^{c}
- Thonalmus Bourgeois, 1883^{bl c w}
- Tishechkinia Kazantsev, 2013^{c}
- Tricautires Kazantsev, 2006^{c w}
- Trichalus Waterhouse, 1877^{bl c w}
- Tricostaeptera† Kasantsev, 1997^{c}

== U ==
- Ukachaka Kazantsev, 2000^{c w}
- Ultroplateros Kazantsev, 2006^{bl c w}

== V ==
- Vikhrevia Kazantsev, 2013^{bl w}

== W ==
- Wakarumbia Bocak, 1999^{bl c w}
- Weiyangia Bocak, 1999^{c w}

== X ==
- Xenolycus Ferreira & Silveira, 2020^{bl c w}
- Xenomorphon Ferreira, Barbosa, Bocakova & Solodovnikov, 2023^{bl c w}
- Xylobanellus Kleine, 1930^{bl c w}
- Xylobanomimus Kleine, 1926^{c w}
- Xylobanoides Kleine, 1928^{c w}
- Xylobanus Waterhouse, 1879^{bl c w}
- Xylometanoeus Sklenarova, Kubecek & Bocak, 2014^{c w}

== Notes ==
Data sources:bl=Biolib, c=Catalogue of Life, w=Wikispecies
