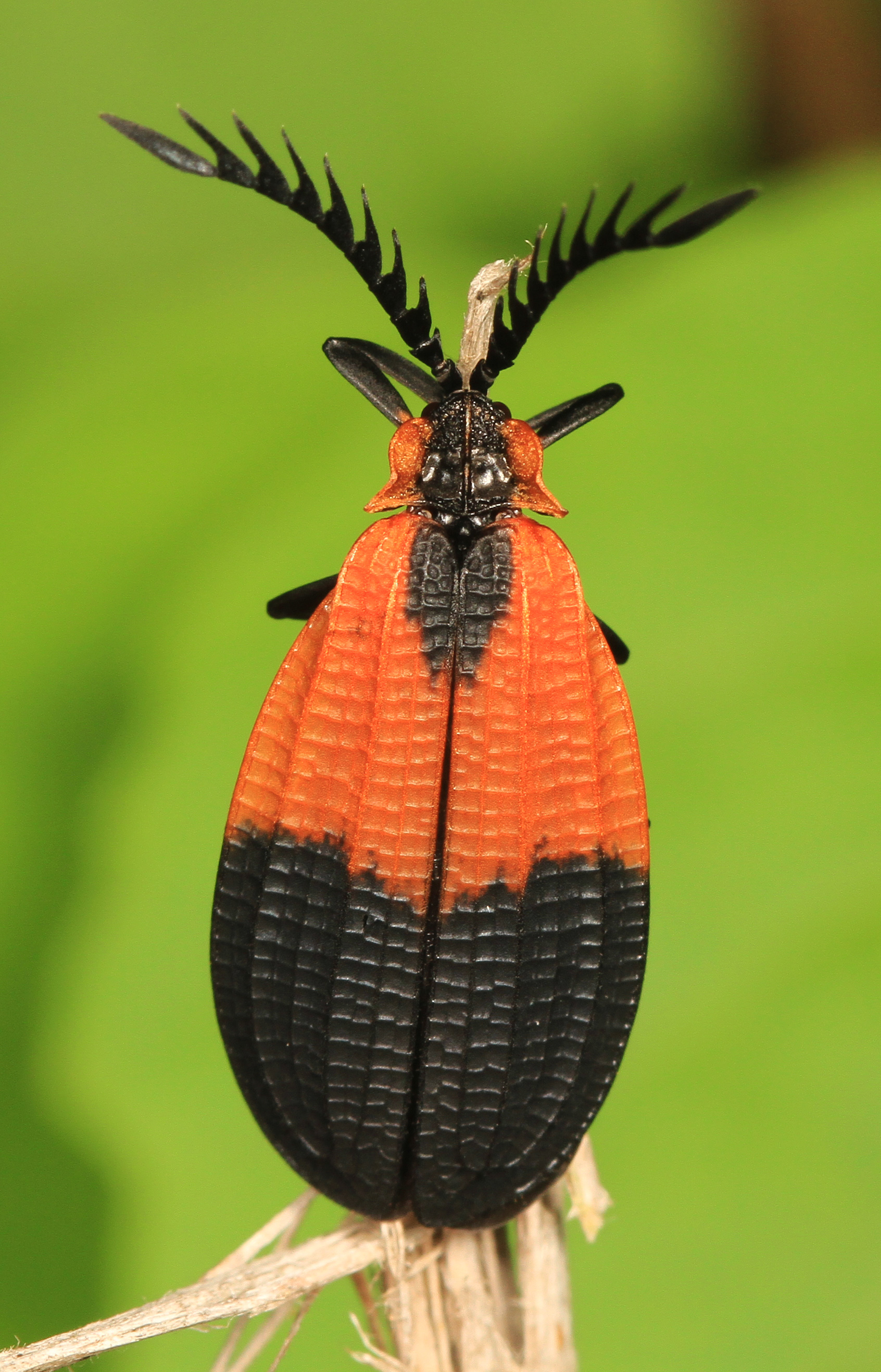
- Caenia dimidiata

Scientific classification
- Kingdom: Animalia
- Phylum: Arthropoda
- Clade: Pancrustacea
- Class: Insecta
- Order: Coleoptera
- Suborder: Polyphaga
- Infraorder: Elateriformia
- Superfamily: Elateroidea
- Family: Lycidae
- Subfamily: Lycinae; Laporte, 1836

= Lycinae =

Subfamily of beetles

Lycinae is a subfamily of net-winged beetles in the family Lycidae.

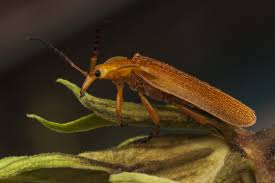
Lycus loripes

== Tribes and genera ==
BioLib includes 11 tribes:

=== Calochromini ===
Auth.: Lacordaire, 1857 - sometimes placed as subfamily Calochrominae

1. Calochromus Guérin-Ménéville, 1833
2. Caloptognatha Green, 1954
3. Dumbrellia Lea, 1909
4. Lucaina Dugès, 1879
5. Lygistopterus Mulsant, 1838
6. Macrolygistopterus Pic, 1929

=== Calopterini ===
Auth.: Green, 1949; poss. incomplete genera:

subtribe Acroleptina Bocáková, 2005

- Acroleptus Bourgeois, 1886
- Aporrhipis Pascoe, 1887
- Paracroleptus costae (Ferreira, 2015)

subtribe Calopterina Green, 1949

1. Calopteron Laporte, 1838

subtribe not determined

1. Caenia Newman, 1838
2. Ceratopriomorphus Pic, 1922
3. Emplectus Erichson, 1847
4. Idiopteron Bourgeois, 1905
5. Leptoceletes Green, 1952
6. Metapteron Bourgeois, 1905
7. Xenolycus Ferreira & Silveira, 2020

=== Conderini ===
Auth.: Bocak & Bocakova, 1990

1. Conderis Waterhouse, 1879
2. Xylobanellus Kleine, 1930

=== Dihammatini ===
Auth.: Bocák & Bocáková, 2008

1. Dihammatus Waterhouse 1879

=== Eurrhacini ===
Auth.: Bocakova, 2005

1. Cladocalon Nascimento & Bocakova, 2022
2. Currhaeus Nascimento, Bressan & Bocakova, 2020

=== Lycini ===
Auth.: Laporte de Castelnau, 1836; selected genera:

- Lopholycus Bourgeois, 1883
- Lyconotus Green, 1949
- Lycus Fabricius, 1787

=== Lyponiini ===
Auth.: Bocak & Bocakova, 1990

1. Lyponia Waterhouse, 1878

=== Macrolycini ===
Auth.: Kleine, 1929

1. Calcaeron Kazantsev, 2004
2. Cerceros Kraatz, 1879
3. Macrolycus Waterhouse, 1878

=== Melanerotini ===
Auth.: Kazantsev, 2010

1. Melaneros Fairmaire, 1879
2. Polyneros Kazantsev, 2009

=== Metriorrhynchini ===
Auth.: Kleine, 1926

subtribe Hemiconderinina Bocák & Bocáková, 1990

- Hemiconderis Kleine, 1926 (poss. misspelling: Hemiconderidis)

subtribe Metriorrhynchina Kleine, 1926

1. Cautires Waterhouse, 1879
2. Metriorrhynchus Gemminger & Harold, 1869
3. Xylobanus Waterhouse, 1879

subtribe Trichalina Kleine, 1929

1. Trichalus Waterhouse, 1877

unplaced genera

1. Achras Waterhouse, 1879
2. Broxylus Waterhouse, 1879
3. Cladophorus Guérin-Méneville, 1830
4. Enylus Waterhouse, 1879
5. Flabellotrichalus Pic, 1921
6. Mangkutanus Kubecek, Dvorak & Bocak, 2011
7. Porrostoma Laporte, 1838
8. Procautires Kleine, 1925
9. Stadenus Waterhouse, 1879
10. Synchonnus Waterhouse, 1879
11. Wakarumbia Bocak, 1999

=== Platerodini ===
Auth.: Kleine, 1929

1. Lyponia Waterhouse, 1878
2. Melaneros Fairmaire, 1877
3. Plateros Bourgeois, 1879
4. Teroplas Gorham, 1884

=== Thonalmini ===
Auth.: Kleine, 1933

1. Thonalmus Bourgeois, 1883
