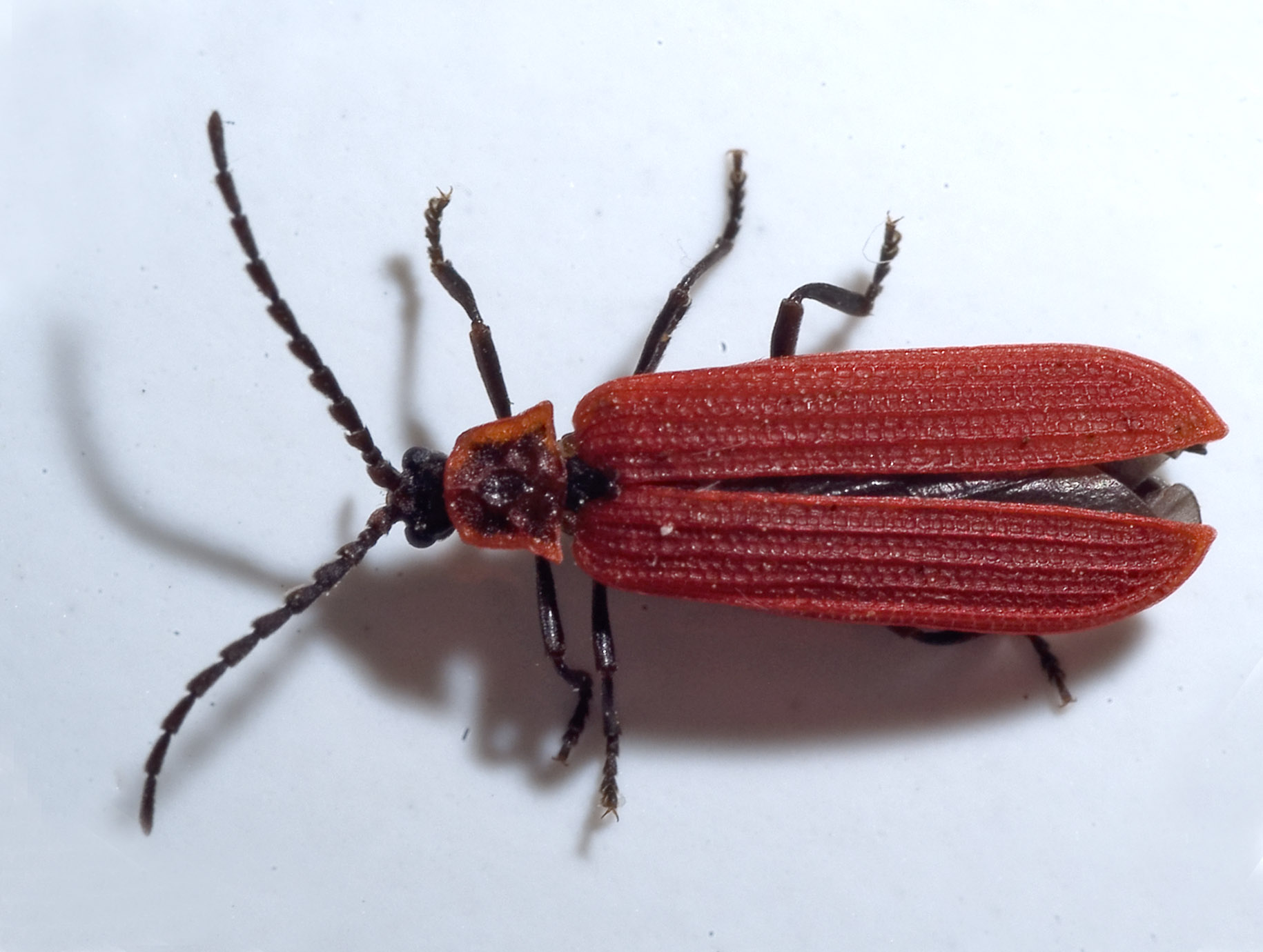
- Dictyoptera aurora

Scientific classification
- Kingdom: Animalia
- Phylum: Arthropoda
- Class: Insecta
- Order: Coleoptera
- Suborder: Polyphaga
- Infraorder: Elateriformia
- Family: Lycidae
- Subfamily: Erotinae; LeConte, 1881

= Erotinae =

Subfamily of beetles

Erotinae is a subfamily of net-winged beetles in the family Lycidae. There are about 10 genera and 19 described species in Erotinae.

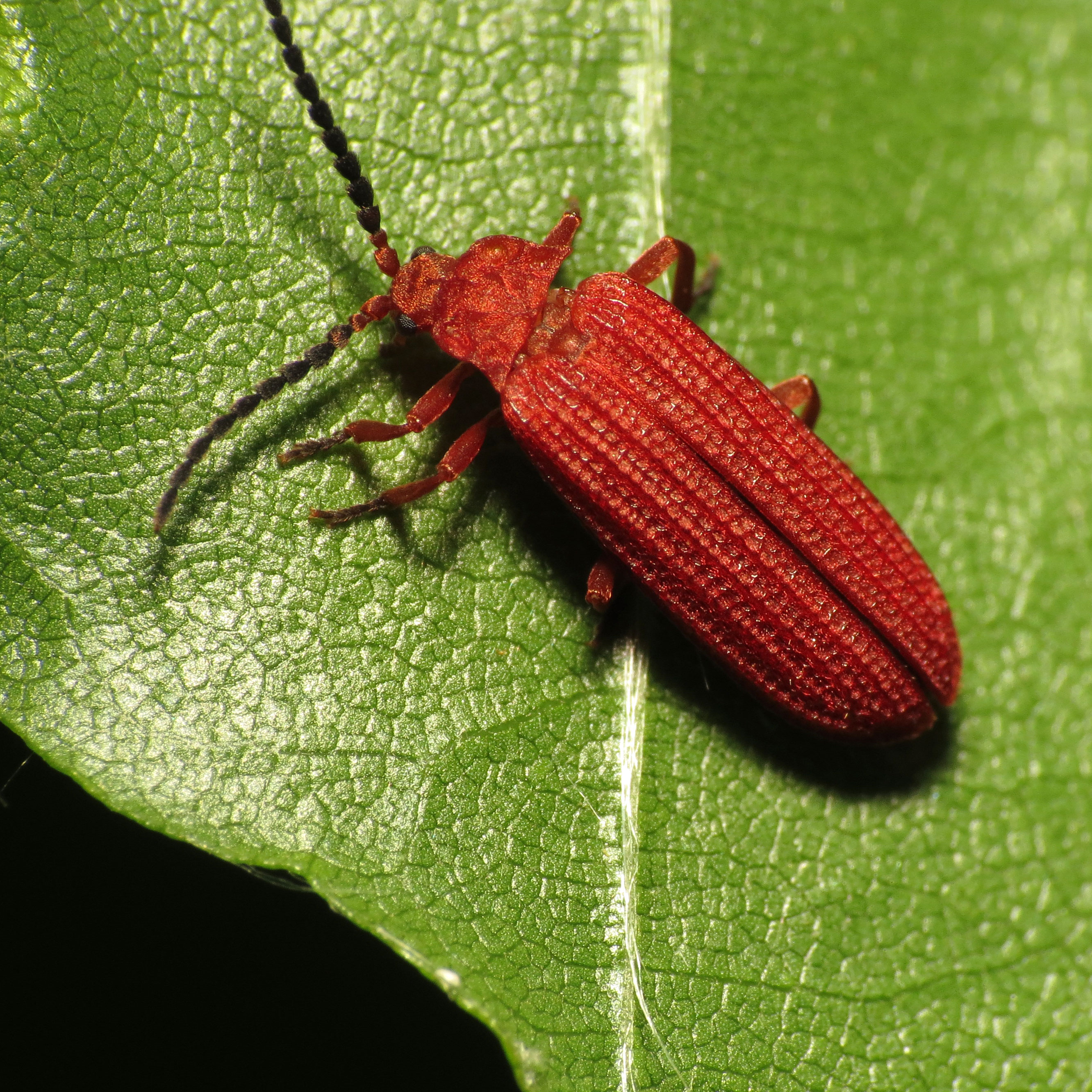
Punicealis munda

== Genera ==
- Adoceta Bourgeois, 1882
- Benibotarus Kono, 1932
- Dictyoptera Latreille, 1829
- Eropterus Green, 1951
- Eros Newman, 1838
- Erotides Waterhouse, 1879
- Gomezzuritus Kazantsev, Motyka Bocak, 2023
- Greenarus Kazantsev, 1995
- Helcophorus Fairmaire, 1891
- Lopheros Leconte, 1881
- Platycis Thomson, 1864
- Punicealis Kazantsev, 1990
- Pyropterus Mulsant, 1838
