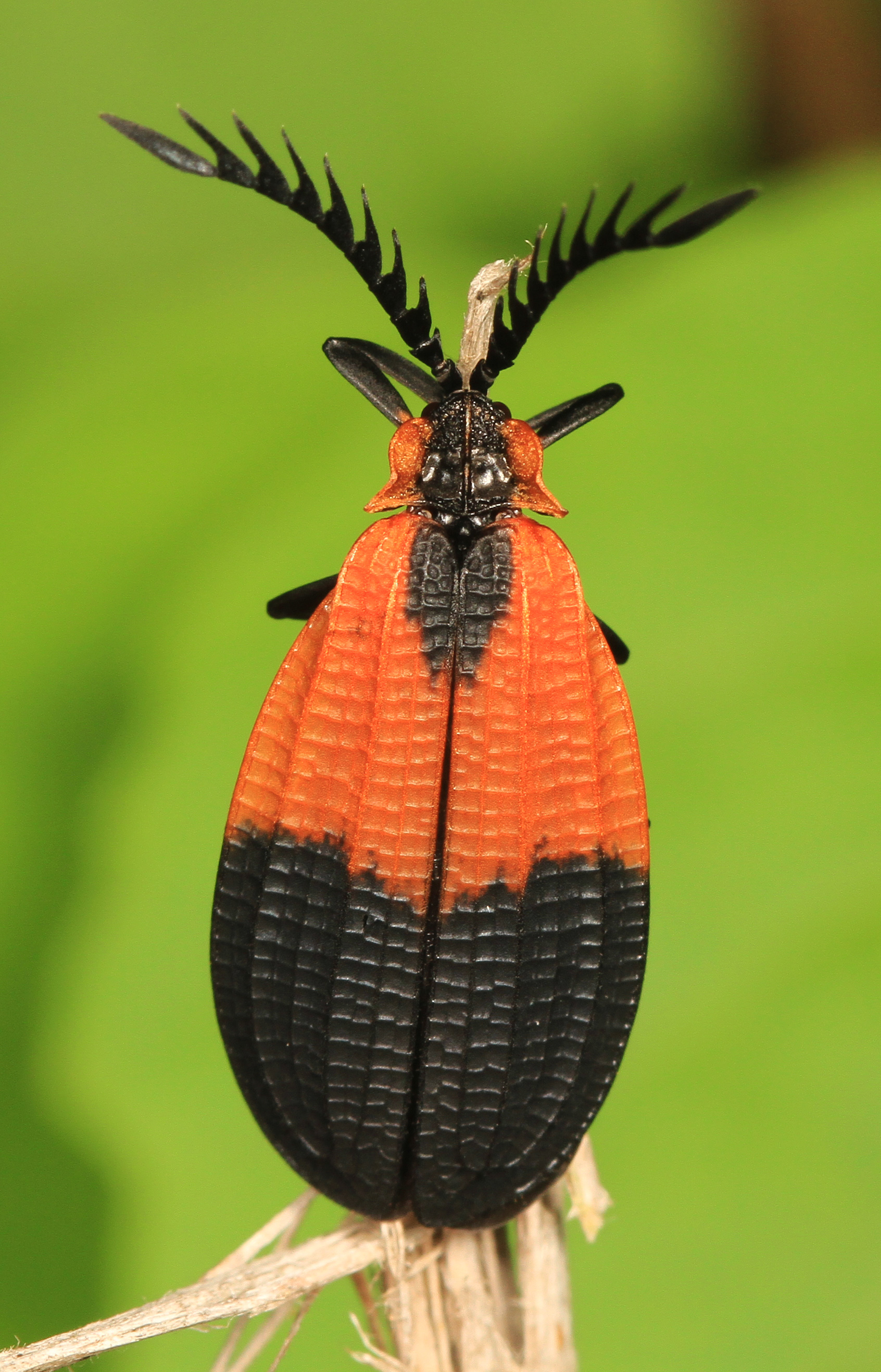

Scientific classification
- Kingdom: Animalia
- Phylum: Arthropoda
- Class: Insecta
- Order: Coleoptera
- Suborder: Polyphaga
- Infraorder: Elateriformia
- Family: Lycidae
- Genus: Caenia
- Species: C. dimidiata

Binomial name
- Caenia dimidiata (Fabricius, 1801)

= Caenia dimidiata =

Species of beetle

Caenia dimidiata is a species of net-winged beetle in the family Lycidae. It is found in North America.
