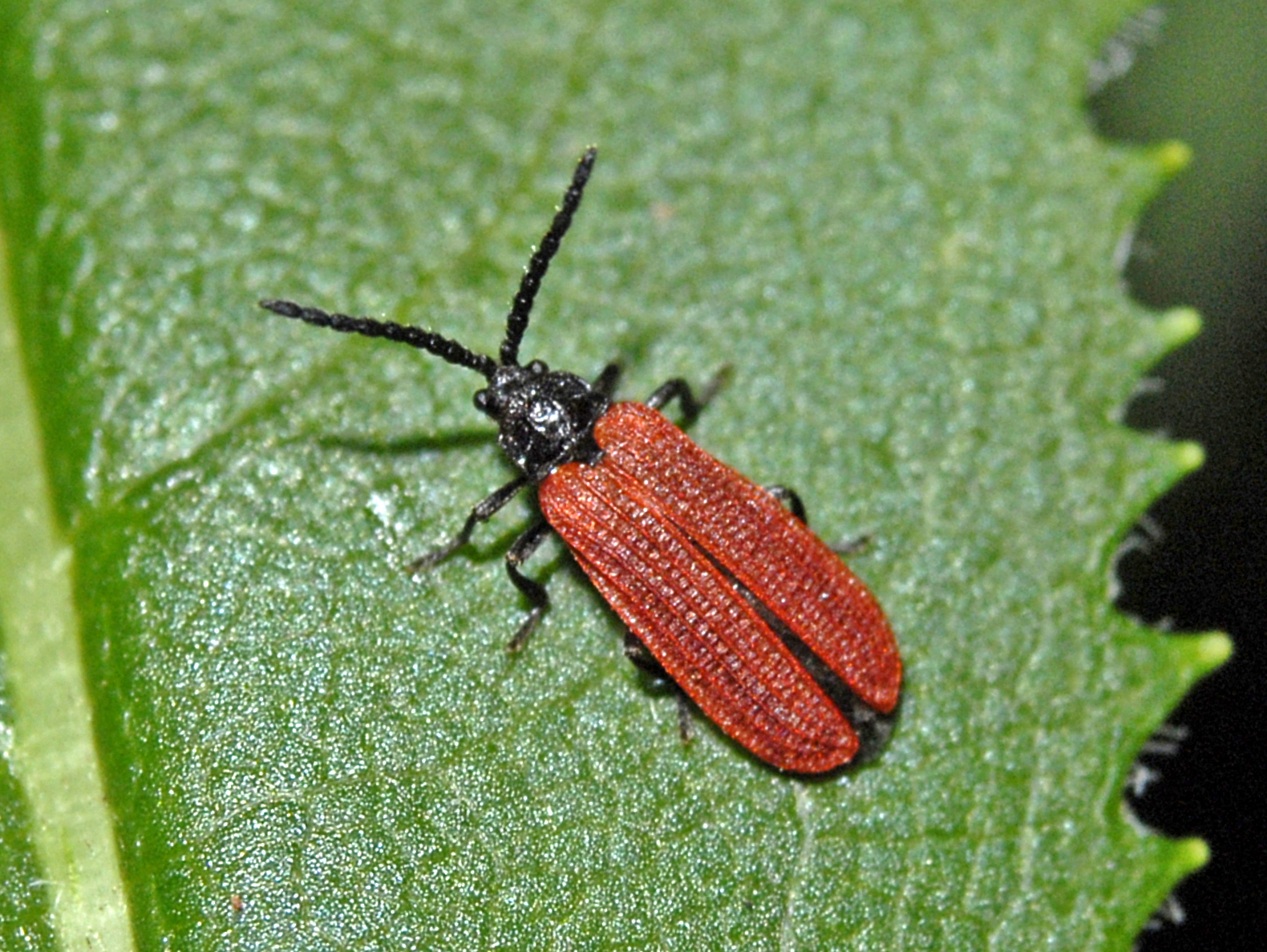
- Pyropterus nigroruber

Scientific classification
- Kingdom: Animalia
- Phylum: Arthropoda
- Class: Insecta
- Order: Coleoptera
- Suborder: Polyphaga
- Infraorder: Elateriformia
- Family: Lycidae
- Genus: Pyropterus
- Species: P. nigroruber

Binomial name
- Pyropterus nigroruber (DeGeer, 1774)

Synonyms
- Pyropterus affinis (Paykull, 1799)

= Pyropterus nigroruber =

Species of beetle

Pyropterus nigroruber is a species of net-winged beetles belonging to the family Lycidae.

== Description ==
Pyropterus nigroruber can reach a length of about 7.5–10 millimetres (0.30–0.39 in). This small net-winged beetles have an elongated and flattened body, with black head and pronotum, while elytra are brick-red in colour and show four longitudinal carinae connected by week transverse lines.

The long, thick, and serrate antennae have eleven antennal segments. The segments two and three are very short and almost equal in length.

Adults occurs from June to August. The predaceous larvae pupate in rotten wood, mainly in dead birch timber. They feed on small insects.

== Distribution and habitat ==
This species is present in the eastern Palearctic realm and in most of European countries. It occurs in lowlands and highlands in moist forests.

== Bibliography ==
- Anderson, R., Nash, R. & O'Connor, J.P.. 1997, Irish Coleoptera: a revised and annotated list, Irish Naturalists' Journal Special Entomological Supplement, 1-81
- Joy, N.H., 1932, A practical handbook of British beetles, H.F. & G. Witherby, London
- S.V. Kazantsev, N.B. Nikitsky Larvae of net-winged beetles (Lycidae: Coleoptera) of the European part of Russia and the Caucasus
