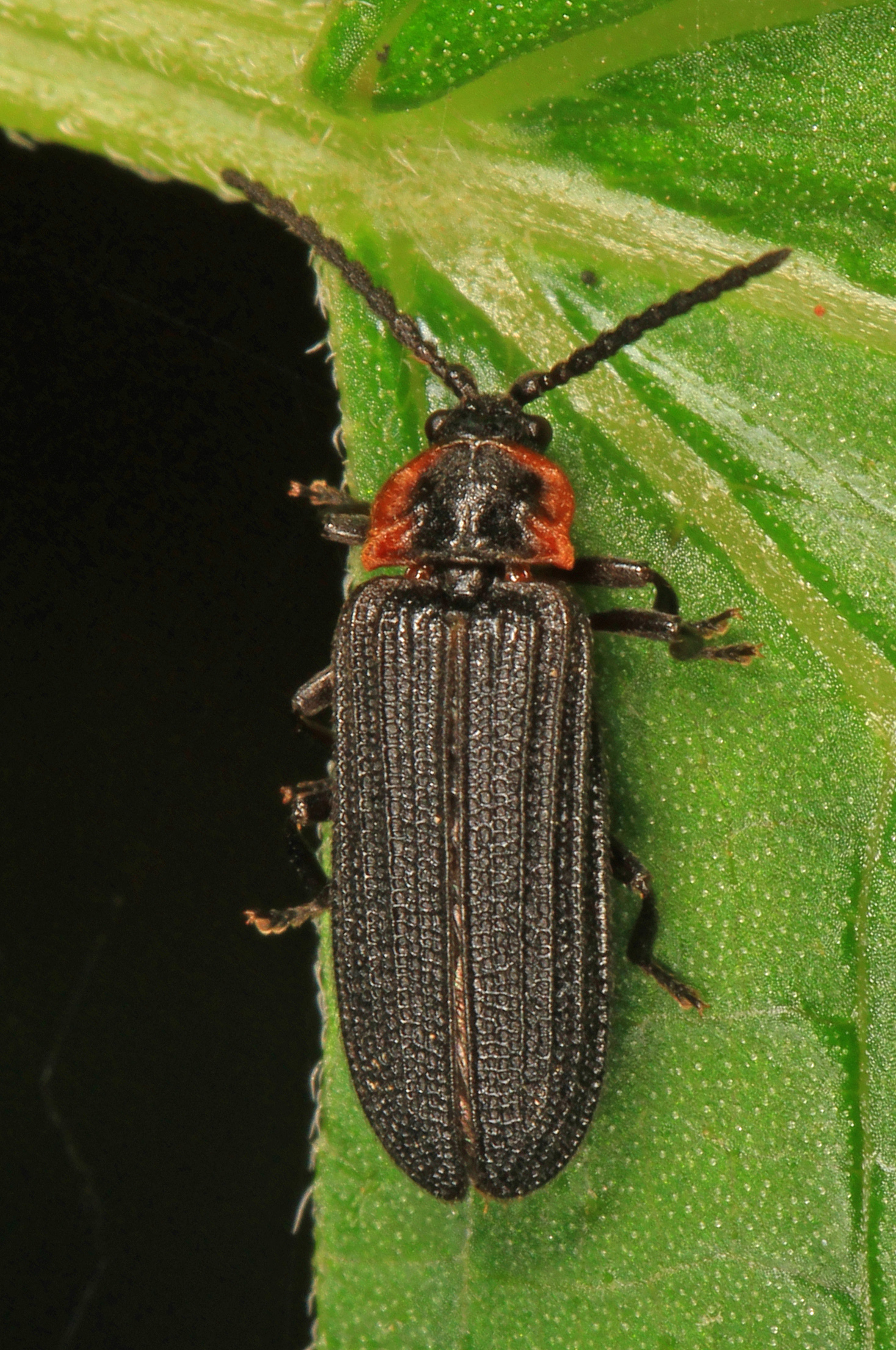

Scientific classification
- Domain: Eukaryota
- Kingdom: Animalia
- Phylum: Arthropoda
- Class: Insecta
- Order: Coleoptera
- Suborder: Polyphaga
- Infraorder: Elateriformia
- Family: Lycidae
- Genus: Eropterus
- Species: E. trilineatus

Binomial name
- Eropterus trilineatus (Melsheimer, 1846)

= Eropterus trilineatus =

Species of beetle

Eropterus trilineatus is a species of net-winged beetle in the family Lycidae. It is found in North America.
