= Cautires elegans =

Scientific classification
- Kingdom: Animalia
- Phylum: Arthropoda
- Class: Insecta
- Order: Coleoptera
- Suborder: Polyphaga
- Infraorder: Elateriformia
- Family: Lycidae
- Genus: Cautires
- Species: C. elegans

Binomial name
- Cautires elegans

Species of beetle

Cautires elegans is a species of beetles in the family Lycidae.
