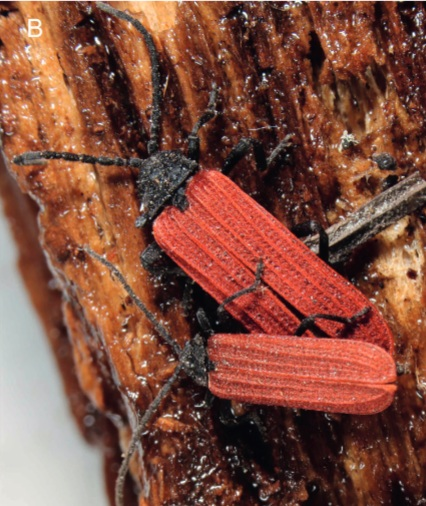

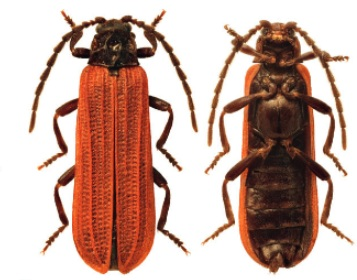

Scientific classification
- Kingdom: Animalia
- Phylum: Arthropoda
- Clade: Pancrustacea
- Class: Insecta
- Order: Coleoptera
- Suborder: Polyphaga
- Infraorder: Elateriformia
- Family: Lycidae
- Genus: Gomezzuritus
- Species: G. alternatus

Binomial name
- Gomezzuritus alternatus (Fairmaire, 1856)

Synonyms
- Dictyopterus alternatus Fairmaire, 1856; Dictyoptera alternata; Benibotarus alternatus; Dictyopterus decipiens Marseul, 1875

= Gomezzuritus alternatus =

Species of beetle

Gomezzuritus alternatus is a species of beetle in the family Lycidae. It is found in Portugal, north-western Spain and the Pyrenees (France and Spain).

== Biology ==
Adults occur from late March to mid-June, commonly sitting on herb and fern leaves, flying in late afternoon or early evening hours or when disturbed. The species is often found in old pine forests in lower mountain elevations.

Larvae have been collected from moist red-rotten pine wood.
