= Leptoceletes dehiscens =

Scientific classification
- Domain: Eukaryota
- Kingdom: Animalia
- Phylum: Arthropoda
- Class: Insecta
- Order: Coleoptera
- Suborder: Polyphaga
- Infraorder: Elateriformia
- Family: Lycidae
- Genus: Leptoceletes
- Species: L. dehiscens

Binomial name
- Leptoceletes dehiscens (Green, 1952)

Synonyms
- Celetes dehiscens Green, 1952

Species of beetle

Leptoceletes dehiscens is a species of net-winged beetle in the family Lycidae. It is found in North America.
