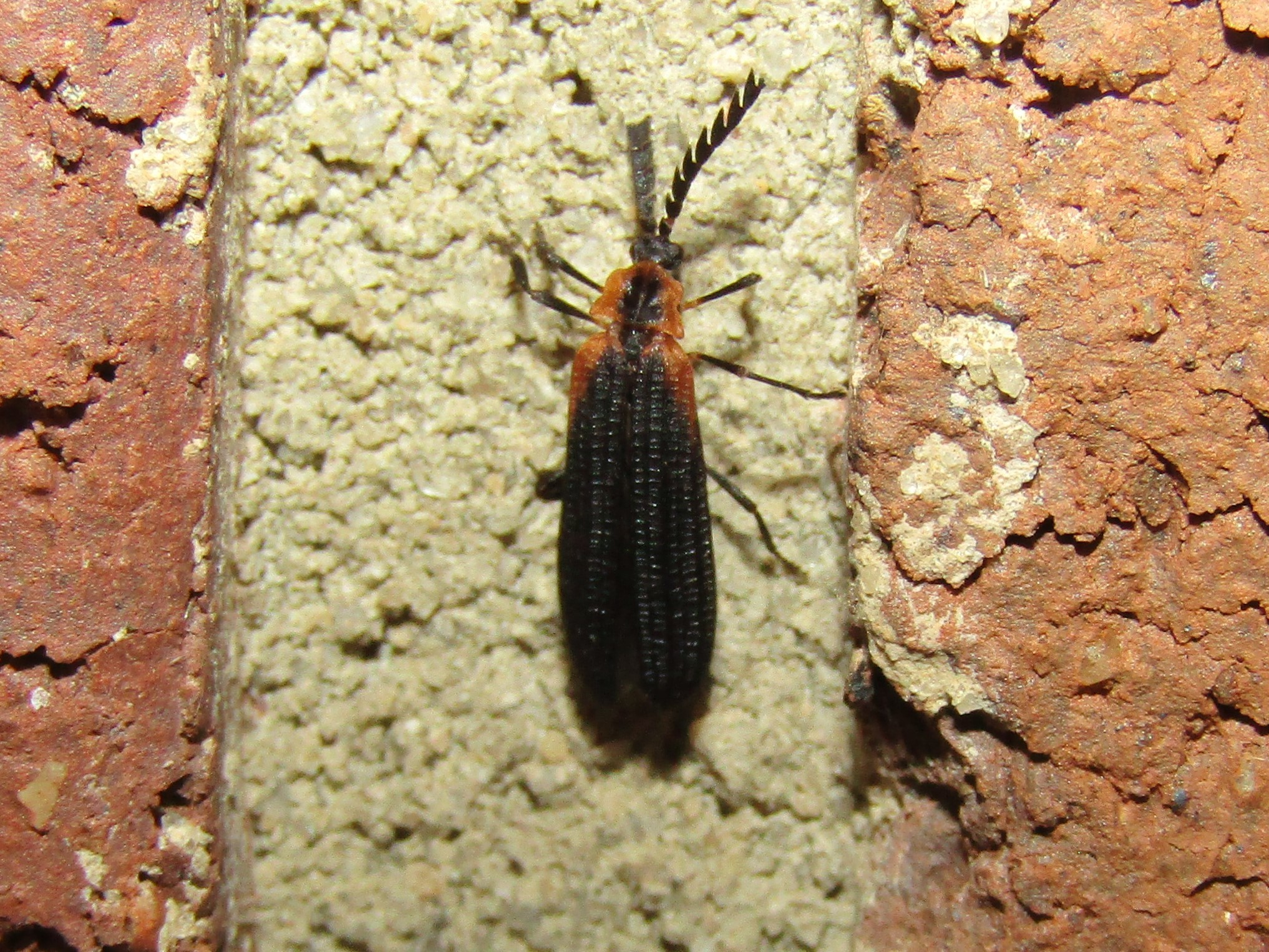

Scientific classification
- Kingdom: Animalia
- Phylum: Arthropoda
- Class: Insecta
- Order: Coleoptera
- Suborder: Polyphaga
- Infraorder: Elateriformia
- Family: Lycidae
- Genus: Leptoceletes
- Species: L. basalis

Binomial name
- Leptoceletes basalis (LeConte, 1847)

Synonyms
- Celetes basalis LeConte, 1847

= Leptoceletes basalis =

Species of beetle

Leptoceletes basalis is a species of net-winged beetle in the family Lycidae. It is found in North America.
