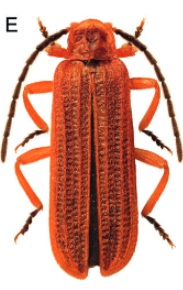

Scientific classification
- Kingdom: Animalia
- Phylum: Arthropoda
- Class: Insecta
- Order: Coleoptera
- Suborder: Polyphaga
- Infraorder: Elateriformia
- Family: Lycidae
- Genus: Gomezzuritus
- Species: G. rubripes

Binomial name
- Gomezzuritus rubripes (Pic, 1897)

Synonyms
- Eros (Pyropterus) rubripes Pic, 1897; Pyropterus rubripes

= Gomezzuritus rubripes =

Species of beetle

Gomezzuritus rubripes is a species of beetle of the family Lycidae. It is found in Algeria and Morocco.
