= Lucaina marginata =

Scientific classification
- Domain: Eukaryota
- Kingdom: Animalia
- Phylum: Arthropoda
- Class: Insecta
- Order: Coleoptera
- Suborder: Polyphaga
- Infraorder: Elateriformia
- Family: Lycidae
- Genus: Lucaina
- Species: L. marginata

Binomial name
- Lucaina marginata Gorham, 1883

Species of beetle

Lucaina marginata is a species of net-winged beetle in the family Lycidae. It is found in North America.
