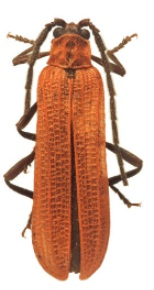

Scientific classification
- Kingdom: Animalia
- Phylum: Arthropoda
- Class: Insecta
- Order: Coleoptera
- Suborder: Polyphaga
- Infraorder: Elateriformia
- Family: Lycidae
- Genus: Gomezzuritus
- Species: G. longicornis

Binomial name
- Gomezzuritus longicornis (Reiche, 1878)

Synonyms
- Eros longicornis Reiche, 1878; Dictyopterus longicornis; Dictyoptera longicornis; Benibotarus longicornis; Pyropterus schelkovnikovi Barovskij, 1930; Benibotarus schelkovnikovi

= Gomezzuritus longicornis =

Species of beetle

Gomezzuritus longicornis is a species of beetle of the family Lycidae. It is found in Georgia and Russia.
