= Achras =

Scientific classification
- Kingdom: Animalia
- Phylum: Arthropoda
- Class: Insecta
- Order: Coleoptera
- Suborder: Polyphaga
- Infraorder: Elateriformia
- Family: Lycidae
- Subfamily: Lycinae
- Tribe: Metriorrhynchini
- Genus: Achras; Waterhouse, 1879
- Species: A. limbatum

Binomial name
- Achras limbatum (Waterhouse, 1877)

Genus of beetles

Achras is a monotypic genus of Australasian beetles in the tribe Metriorrhynchini, erected by Charles Owen Waterhouse in 1879. It contains the species Achras limbatum (Waterhouse, 1877).

== Description ==
The species is nearly black (atratus) with yellowish margins on the thorax and elytra. The base of the third antennal joint, the base of the palpi, the base of the femora, and the coxae are obscure testaceous. The rostrum is absent. The antennae are dentate. The thorax is small, with five areolets; the central areolet is well-defined, extending from the base to the anterior margin. The ridges dividing the lateral areolets are somewhat obscure, and the anterior margin is finely punctured. The elytra are rather narrow at the base, gradually enlarged posteriorly, with the apex arcuately rounded. Each elytron has four costae (the second and fourth being more distinct; none reach the apex). The interstices have very numerous, irregular, and sometimes interrupted transverse ridges (described as rugose punctuation); towards the apex of the first interstice and in the fifth, there are indications of an irregular intermediate longitudinal costa. The penultimate segment of the abdomen has a deep semicircular emargination. The body length is approximately 7.4 mm (0.29 in).

== Distribution ==
This species is endemic to Australia with confirmed presence in Victoria and New South Wales.
