= Gomezzuritus =

Scientific classification
- Kingdom: Animalia
- Phylum: Arthropoda
- Class: Insecta
- Order: Coleoptera
- Suborder: Polyphaga
- Infraorder: Elateriformia
- Family: Lycidae
- Subfamily: Erotinae
- Genus: Gomezzuritus; Kazantsev, Motyka & Bocak, 2023

Genus of beetles

Gomezzuritus is a genus of net-winged beetles in the family Lycidae.

== Species ==
- Gomezzuritus alternatus (Fairmaire, 1856)
- Gomezzuritus longicornis (Reiche, 1878)
- Gomezzuritus rubripes (Pic, 1897)
