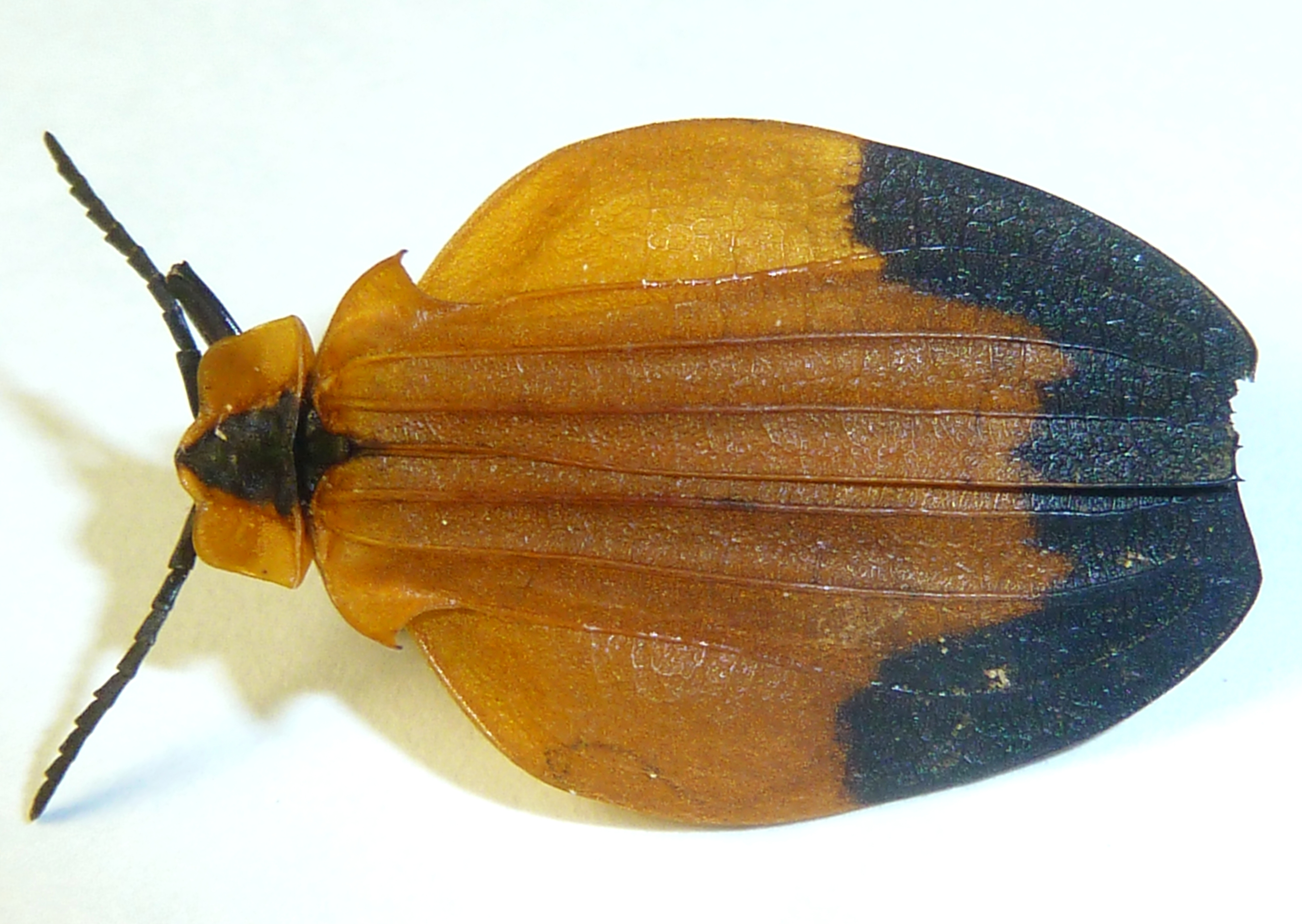
- The upper side of Lycus melanurus

Scientific classification
- Kingdom: Animalia
- Phylum: Arthropoda
- Clade: Pancrustacea
- Class: Insecta
- Order: Coleoptera
- Suborder: Polyphaga
- Infraorder: Elateriformia
- Family: Lycidae
- Subfamily: Lycinae
- Tribe: Lycini; Laporte, 1836

= Lycini =

Tribe of beetles

The Lycini is a species-rich beetle tribe belonging to the subfamily Lycinae

== Description ==
The Lycini is defined by the presence of the rostrum, flat, serrate to parallel-sided antennomeres 3–10, absent pronotal carinae, weak longitudinal and absent or irregular transverse costae in the elytra, tubular mesothoracic spiracles, the spoon-shaped phallobase, short parameres, a long and slender phallus, large lateral glands in the female sexual duct, short valvifers and the short spermaduct.

== Distribution ==
Afrotropical, Palaearctic, Oriental, Australian (Sulawesi and Timor only), Nearctic and Neotropical (northern part only) regions.

== Genera ==
A 2021 study delimited the following genera based on mito-ribosomal data.

- Celiasis Laporte, 1840
- Haplolycus Bourgeois, 1883
- Lipernes Waterhouse, 1879
- Lycostomus Motschulsky, 1861
- Lycus Fabricius, 1787
- Neolycus Bourgeois, 1883
- Rhyncheros LeConte, 1881
