= Calochrominae =

Scientific classification
- Kingdom: Animalia
- Phylum: Arthropoda
- Class: Insecta
- Order: Coleoptera
- Suborder: Polyphaga
- Infraorder: Elateriformia
- Family: Lycidae
- Subfamily: Calochrominae; Lacordaire, 1857

Subfamily of beetles

Calochrominae is a subfamily of net-winged beetles in the family Lycidae. There are at least 4 genera and more than 30 described species in Calochrominae.

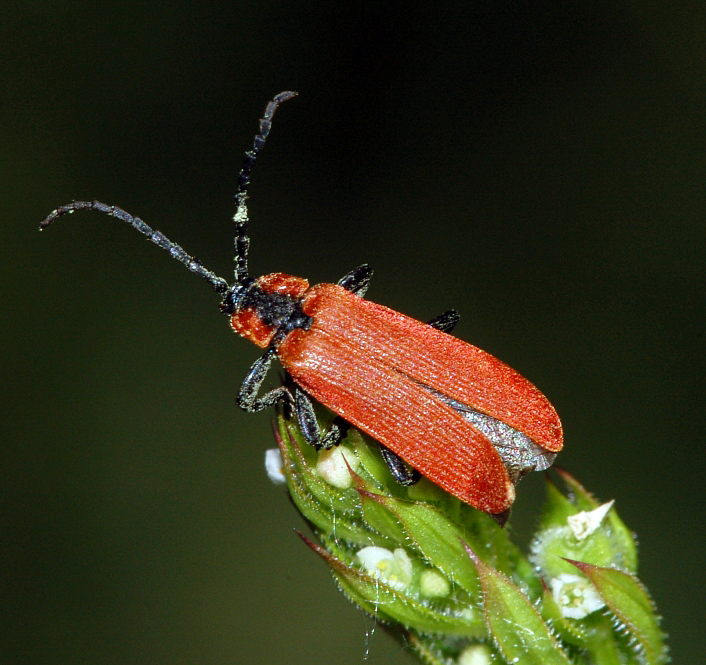
Lygistopterus sanguineus

== Tribes and genera ==
BioLib includes two tribes and the following genera in the subfamily Calochrominae:

Calochromini Lacordaire, 1857

1. Calochromus Guérin-Ménéville, 1833
2. Caloptognatha Green, 1954
3. Dumbrellia Lea, 1909
4. Lucaina Dugès, 1879
5. Lygistopterus Dejean, 1838
6. Macrolygistopterus Pic, 1929

Slipinskiini Bocák & Bocáková, 1992

1. Aferos Kasantsev, 1992
