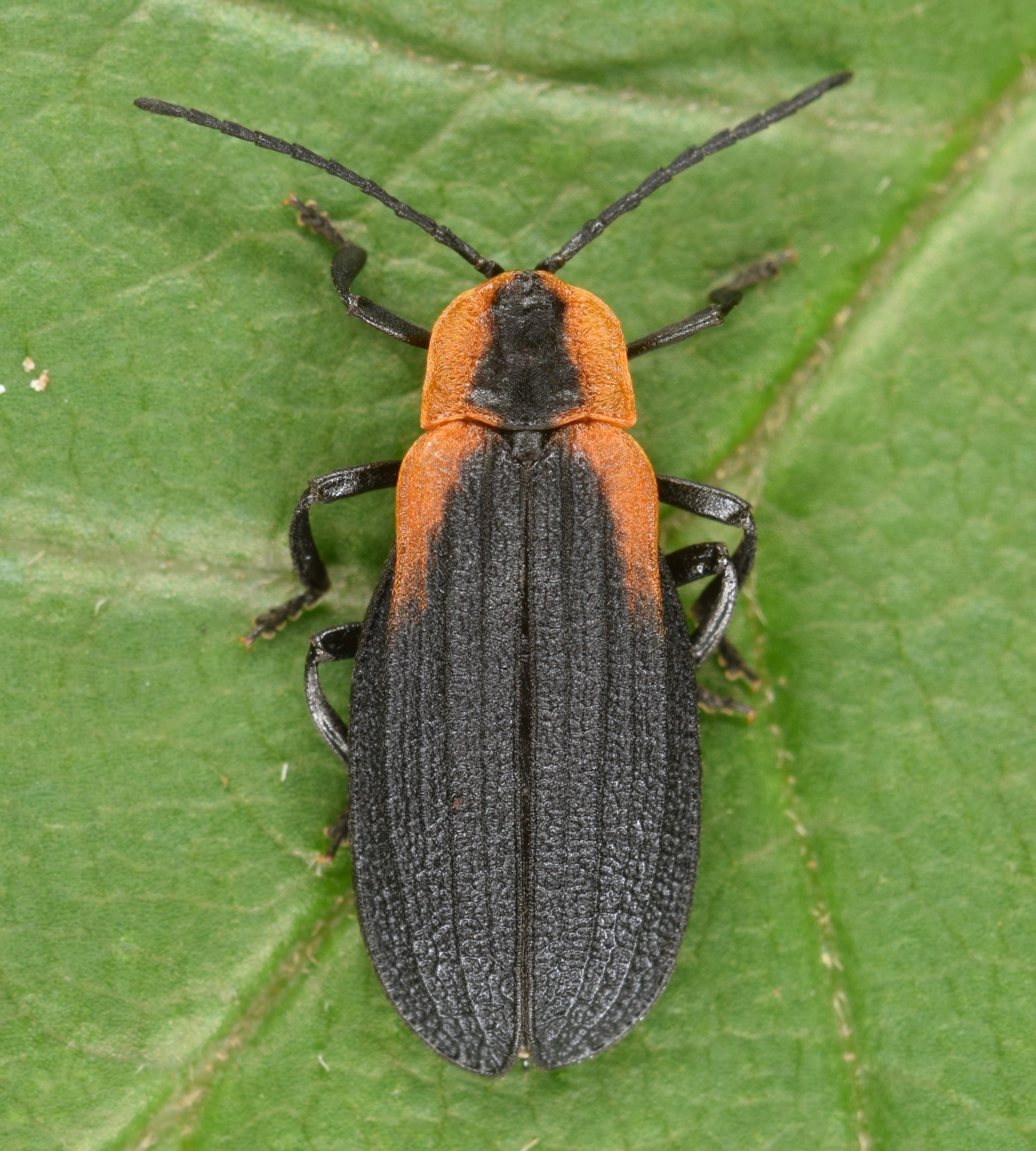

Scientific classification
- Domain: Eukaryota
- Kingdom: Animalia
- Phylum: Arthropoda
- Class: Insecta
- Order: Coleoptera
- Suborder: Polyphaga
- Infraorder: Elateriformia
- Family: Lycidae
- Tribe: Lycini
- Genus: Lyconotus; Green, 1949

= Lyconotus =

Genus of beetles

Lyconotus is a genus of net-winged beetles in the family Lycidae. There is one described species in Lyconotus, L. lateralis.
