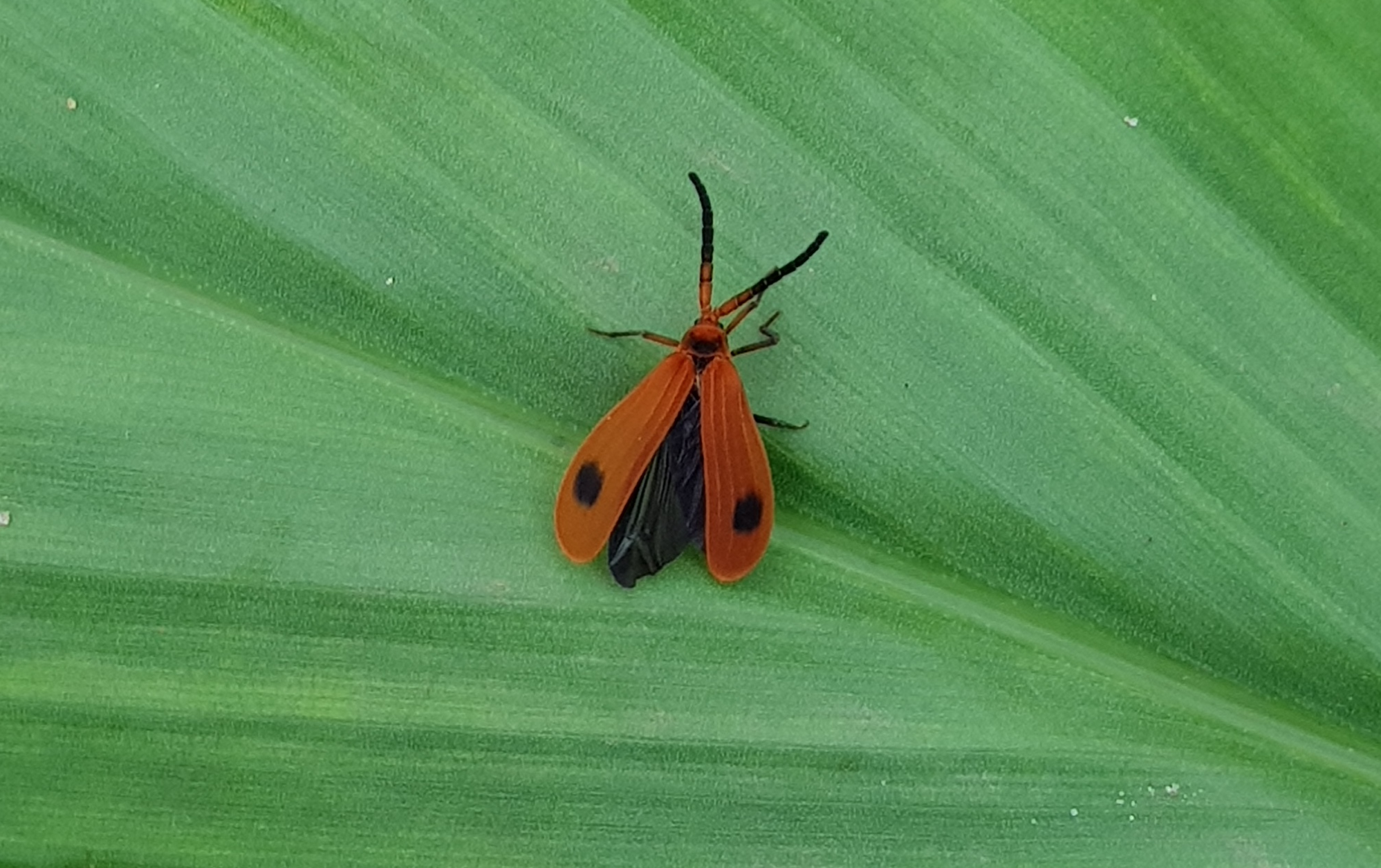

Scientific classification
- Kingdom: Animalia
- Phylum: Arthropoda
- Class: Insecta
- Order: Coleoptera
- Suborder: Polyphaga
- Infraorder: Elateriformia
- Family: Lycidae
- Tribe: Lycini
- Genus: Lycostomus; Motschulsky, 1861

= Lycostomus =

Genus of beetles

Lycostomus is a genus of beetles belonging to the family Lycidae.

The species of this genus are found in Eastern Asia and Northern America.

== Selected species ==
- Lycostomus atrimembris Pic
- Lycostomus crassus Kleine
- Lycostomus formosanus Pic
- Lycostomus honestus (Bourgeois, 1885)
- Lycostomus maroniensis Pic, 1923
- Lycostomus placidus Waterhouse
- Lycostomus similis (Hope, 1831)
