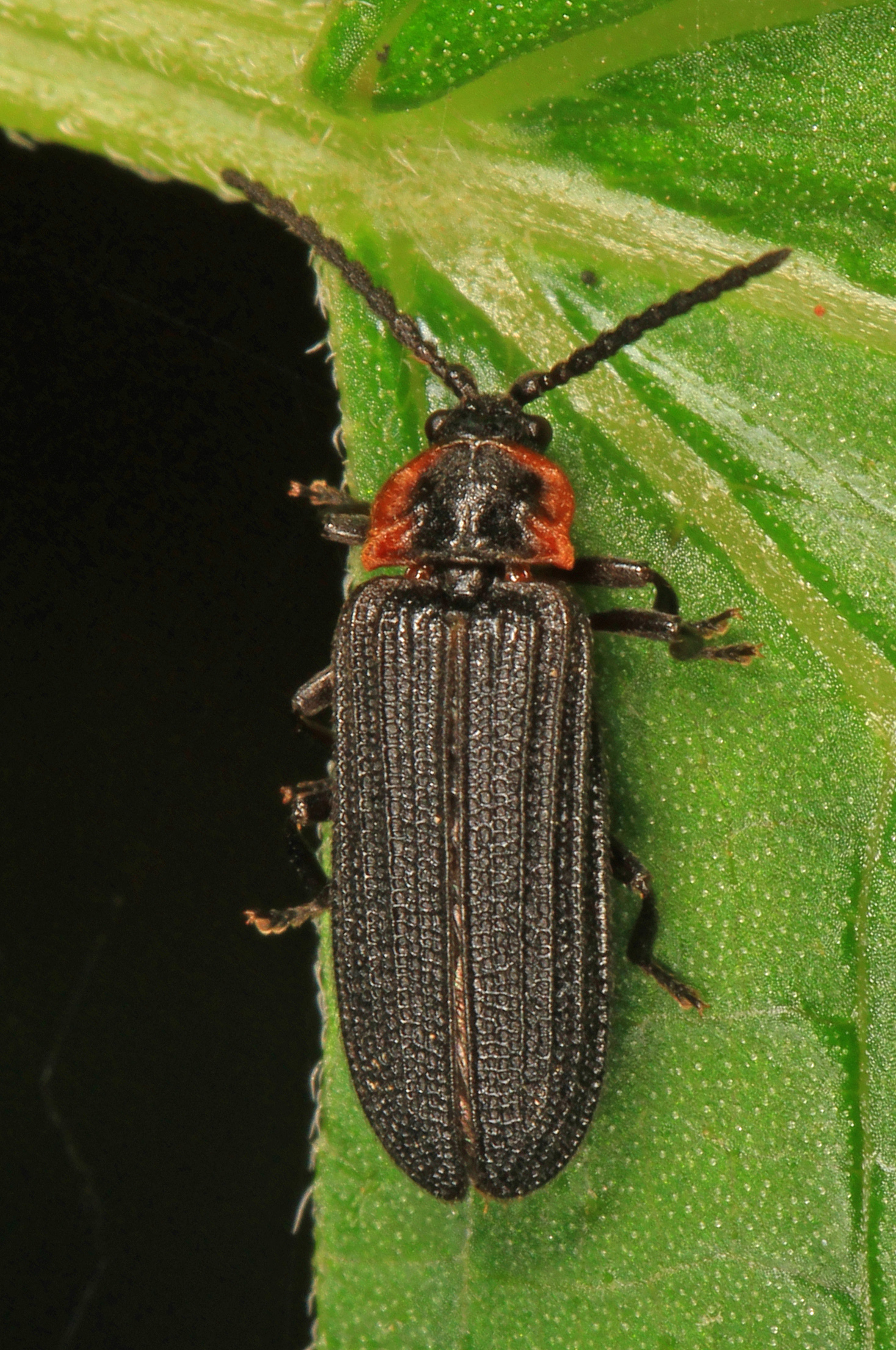
- Eropterus trilineatus

Scientific classification
- Kingdom: Animalia
- Phylum: Arthropoda
- Class: Insecta
- Order: Coleoptera
- Suborder: Polyphaga
- Infraorder: Elateriformia
- Family: Lycidae
- Subfamily: Erotinae
- Genus: Eropterus; Green, 1951

= Eropterus =

Genus of beetles

Eropterus is a genus of net-winged beetles in the family Lycidae. There are about 10 described species in Eropterus.

== Species ==
These 10 species belong to the genus Eropterus:

- Eropterus arculus Green, 1951
- Eropterus aritai (Sato & Ohbayashi, 1968)
- Eropterus bilineatus Green, 1951
- Eropterus flavipennis (Nakane, 1969)
- Eropterus glebulus
- Eropterus masumotoi Matsudai, 2011
- Eropterus ohkurai Matsuda
- Eropterus rectus Green, 1951
- Eropterus taiwanus Matsuda
- Eropterus trilineatus (Melsheimer, 1846)
