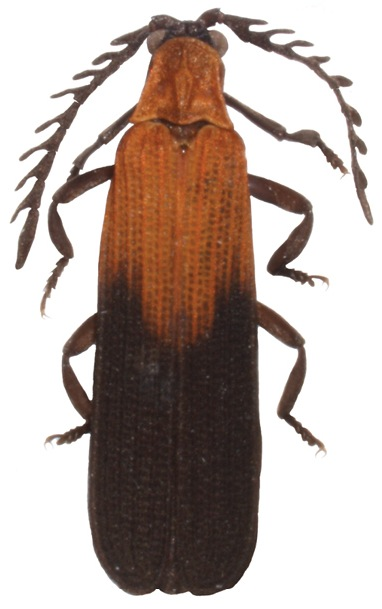
- Cautires walteri

Scientific classification
- Kingdom: Animalia
- Phylum: Arthropoda
- Class: Insecta
- Order: Coleoptera
- Suborder: Polyphaga
- Infraorder: Elateriformia
- Family: Lycidae
- Subfamily: Lycinae
- Genus: Cautires; Waterhouse, 1879

Species
- many, including: Cautires elegans; Cautires walteri

Synonyms
- Bulenides Waterhouse, 1879

= Cautires =

Genus of beetles

Cautires is a genus of beetles in the family Lycidae.
