= Eros (beetle) =

Scientific classification
- Domain: Eukaryota
- Kingdom: Animalia
- Phylum: Arthropoda
- Class: Insecta
- Order: Coleoptera
- Suborder: Polyphaga
- Infraorder: Elateriformia
- Family: Lycidae
- Subfamily: Erotinae
- Genus: Eros; Newman, 1838

Genus of beetles

Eros is a genus of net-winged beetles in the family Lycidae. There are between one and six described species in Eros.

== Species ==
These three species belong to the genus Eros:

- Eros humeralis (Fabricius, 1801)
- Eros nigripes Schaeffer
- Eros ogumae Matsumura, 1911
