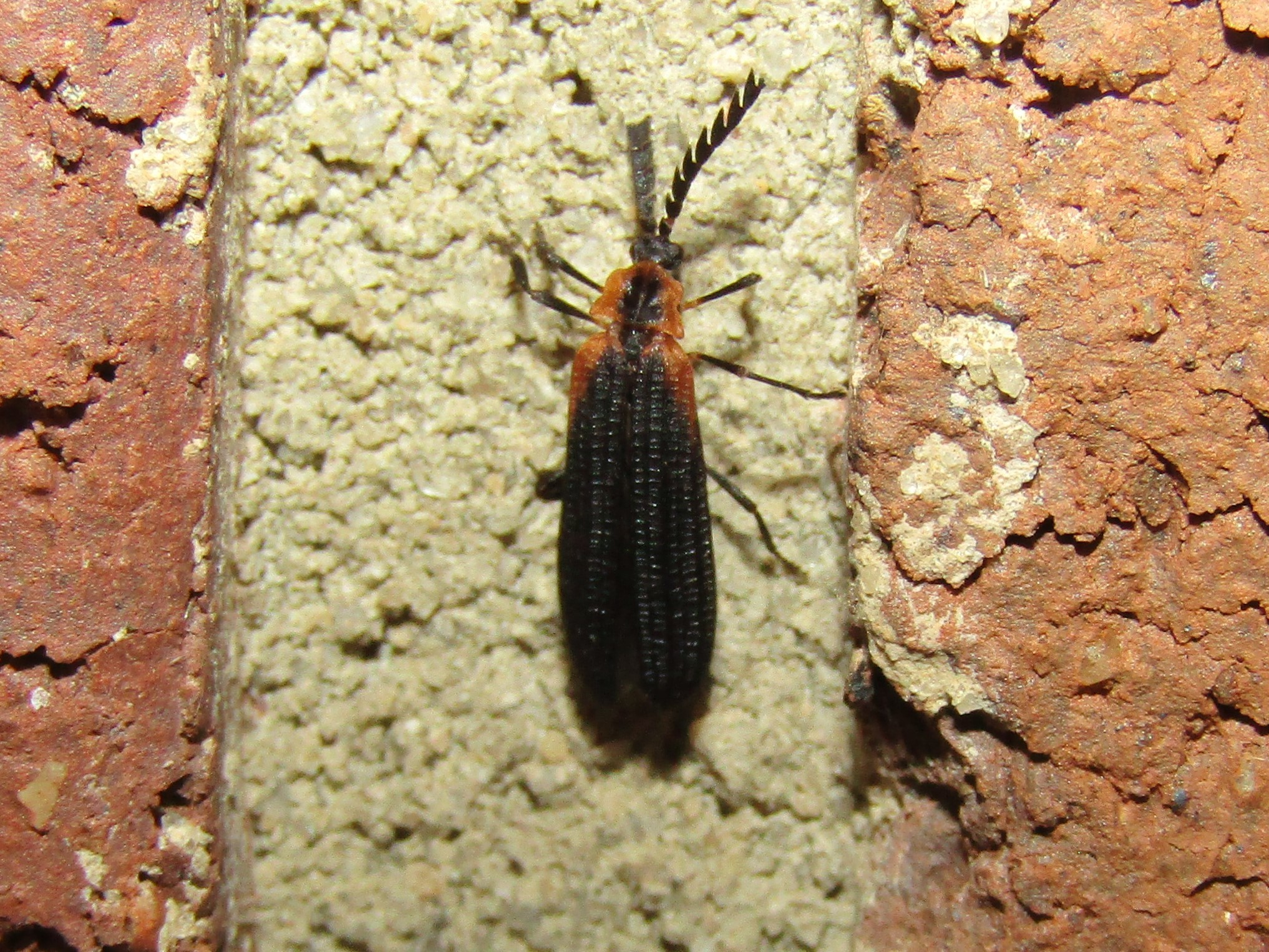
- Leptoceletes basalis

Scientific classification
- Kingdom: Animalia
- Phylum: Arthropoda
- Clade: Pancrustacea
- Class: Insecta
- Order: Coleoptera
- Suborder: Polyphaga
- Infraorder: Elateriformia
- Family: Lycidae
- Tribe: Calopterini
- Genus: Leptoceletes; Green, 1952

= Leptoceletes =

Genus of beetles

Leptoceletes is a genus of net-winged beetles in the family Lycidae. There are about five described species in Leptoceletes.

== Species ==
These species belong to the genus Leptoceletes:

- Leptoceletes basalis (LeConte, 1847)
- Leptoceletes dehiscens (Green, 1952)
- Leptoceletes pallidus (Green, 1952)
