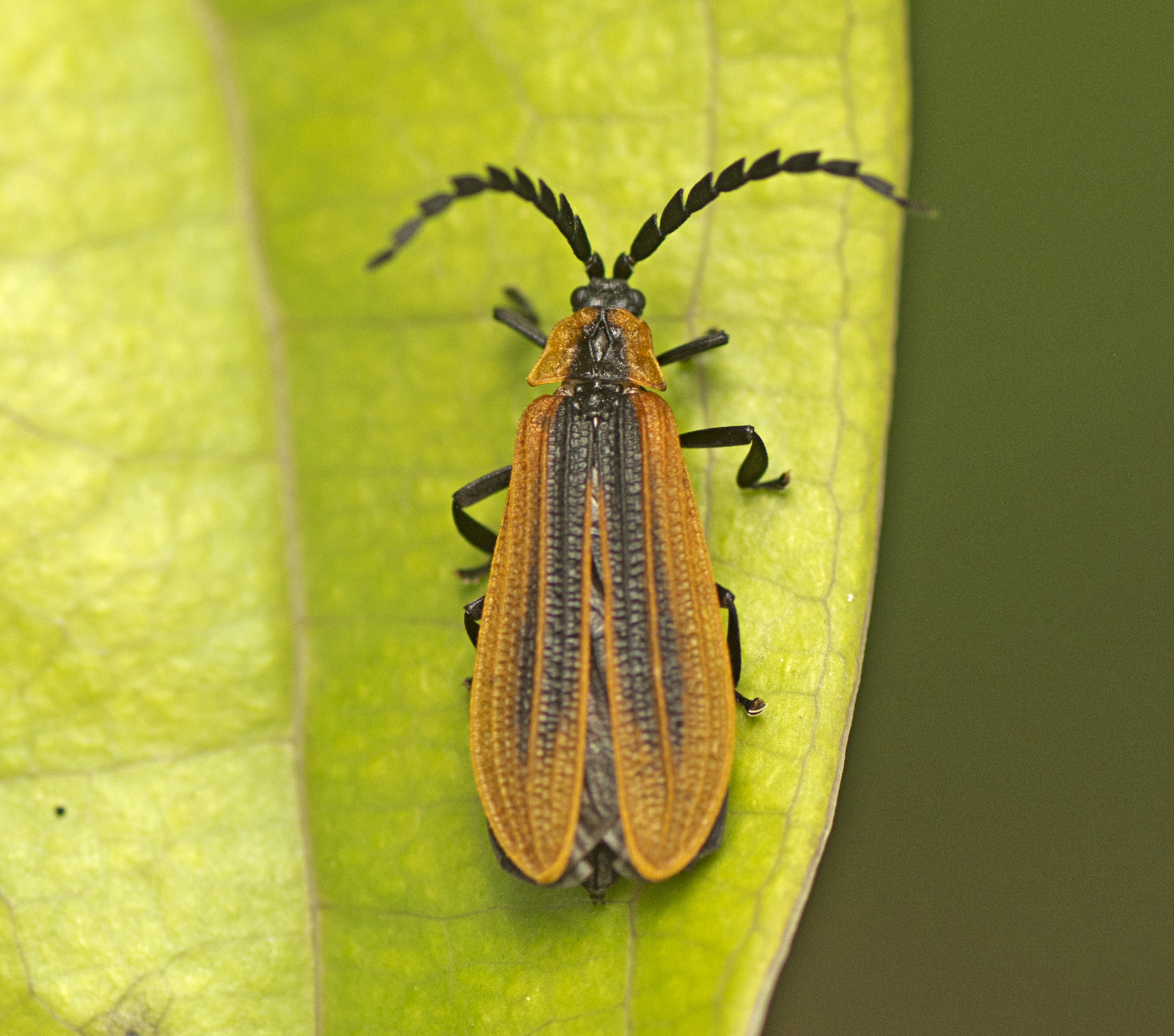
- Metriorrhynchus flavolimbatus

Scientific classification
- Kingdom: Animalia
- Phylum: Arthropoda
- Clade: Pancrustacea
- Class: Insecta
- Order: Coleoptera
- Suborder: Polyphaga
- Infraorder: Elateriformia
- Family: Lycidae
- Subtribe: Metriorrhynchina
- Genus: Metriorrhynchus; Gemminger & Harold, 1869

= Metriorrhynchus =

Genus of beetles

Metriorrynchus is a genus of beetles in the family Lycidae. They occur from Australia north to northern parts of Vietnam, Laos, and Thailand, west to eastern India.

== Description ==
The genus differs from other Asian genera in the tribe Metriorrhynchini by the seven pronotal areolae in the rostrum, the serrated antennae, and the shape of the ovipositor, and the shape of the internal sacs of the male genitalia, which are armed with thorns.

== Taxonomy ==
In 2007, the classification of the Asian species of Metriorrhynchus was revised.

Species include:

- Metriorrynchus inaequalis
- Metriorrynchus isarogensis
- Metriorrynchus laosensis
- Metriorrynchus lineatus
- Metriorrynchus lobatus
- Metriorrynchus longissimus
- Metriorrynchus menieri
- Metriorrynchus mindanaoensis
- Metriorrynchus newbataanensis
- Metriorrynchus ochii
- Metriorrynchus palawanensis
- Metriorrynchus sericans
- Metriorrynchus sericeus
- Metriorrynchus takedai
- Metriorrynchus thoracicus
- Metriorrynchus yoshioi
