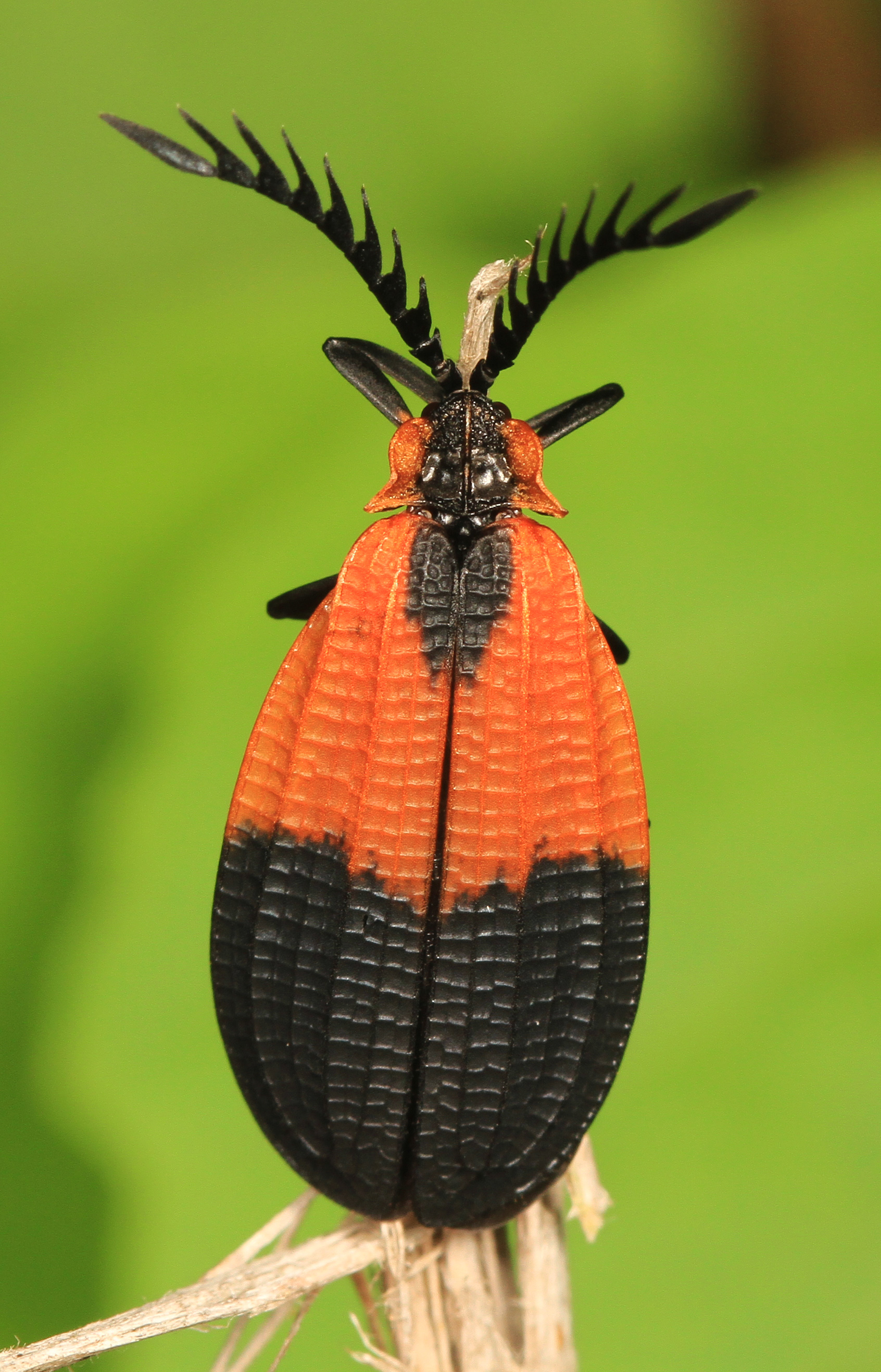
- Caenia dimidiata

Scientific classification
- Kingdom: Animalia
- Phylum: Arthropoda
- Class: Insecta
- Order: Coleoptera
- Suborder: Polyphaga
- Infraorder: Elateriformia
- Family: Lycidae
- Subfamily: Lycinae
- Genus: Caenia

= Caenia =

Genus of beetles

Caenia is a genus of net-winged beetles in the family Lycidae. There are at least 3 described species in Caenia.

== Species ==
- Caenia amplicornis LeConte, 1881
- Caenia dimidiata (Fabricius, 1801)
- Caenia sp-nova
