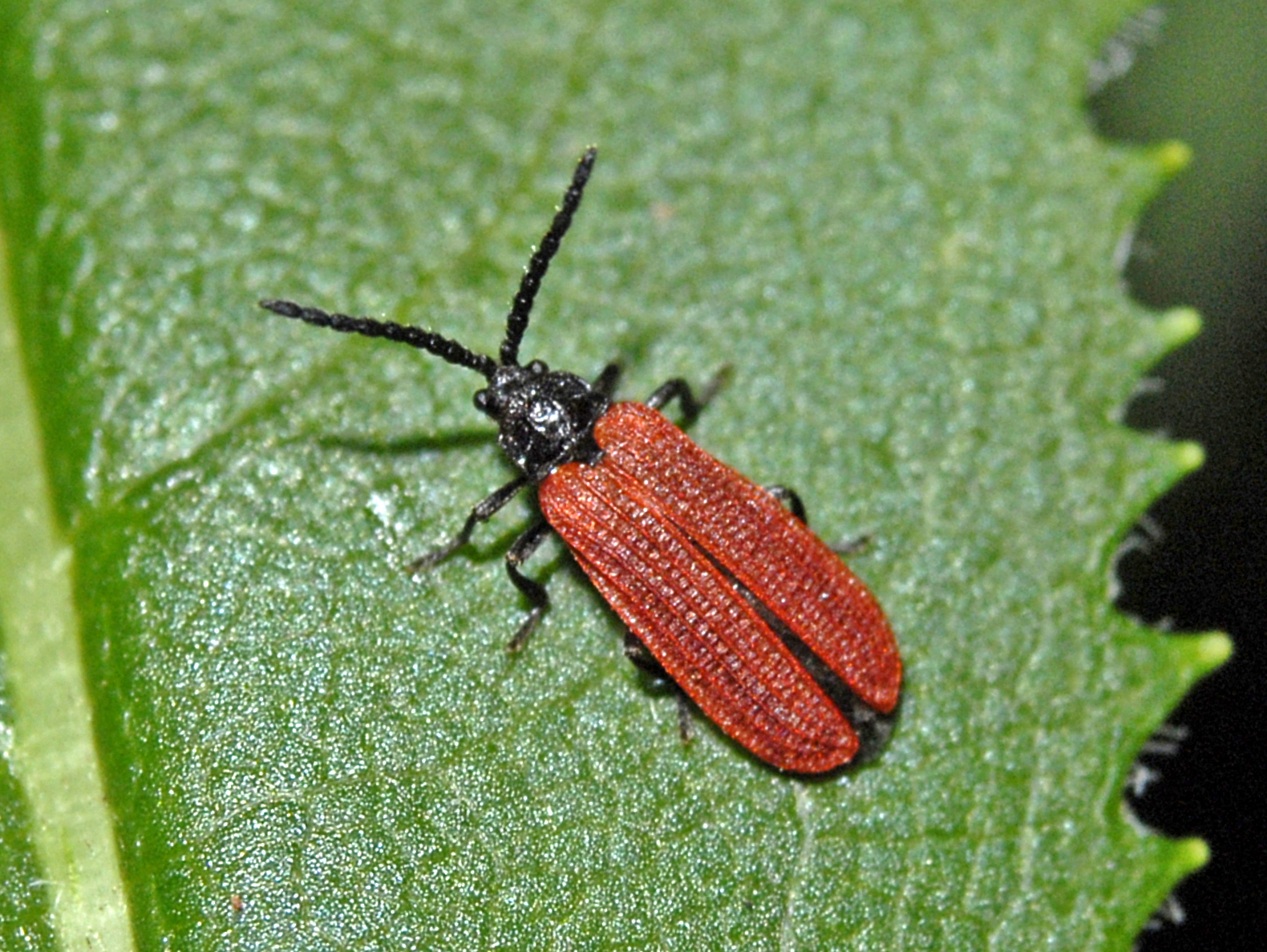
- Pyropterus nigroruber

Scientific classification
- Kingdom: Animalia
- Phylum: Arthropoda
- Class: Insecta
- Order: Coleoptera
- Suborder: Polyphaga
- Infraorder: Elateriformia
- Family: Lycidae
- Genus: Pyropterus; Mulsant, 1838

= Pyropterus =

Genus of beetles

Pyropterus is a genus of net-winged beetles belonging to the family Lycidae.

== Species ==
- Pyropterus nigroruber (DeGeer, 1774)
