= Lucaina =

Scientific classification
- Kingdom: Animalia
- Phylum: Arthropoda
- Class: Insecta
- Order: Coleoptera
- Suborder: Polyphaga
- Infraorder: Elateriformia
- Family: Lycidae
- Subfamily: Calochrominae
- Genus: Lucaina; Dugés, 1878

Genus of beetles

Lucaina is a genus of net-winged beetles in the family Lycidae. There are at least 2 described species in Lucaina.

== Species ==
- Lucaina discoidalis Horn, 1885
- Lucaina marginata Gorham, 1883
