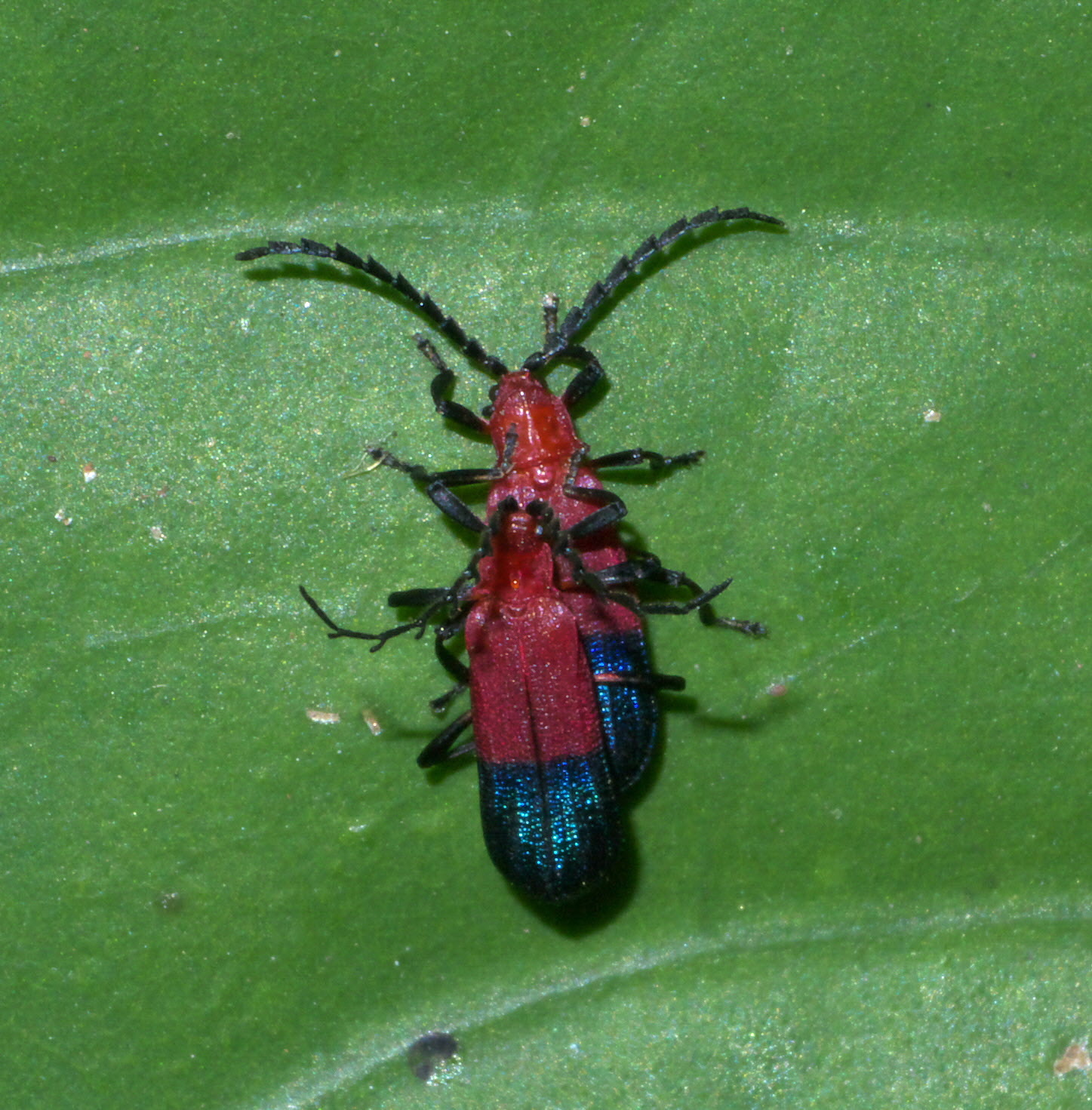
- Thonalmus sp., Cuba

Scientific classification
- Kingdom: Animalia
- Phylum: Arthropoda
- Class: Insecta
- Order: Coleoptera
- Suborder: Polyphaga
- Infraorder: Elateriformia
- Family: Lycidae
- Genus: Thonalmus; Bourgeois, 1884

= Thonalmus =

Genus of beetles

Thonalmus is a genus of net-winged beetles, family Lycidae. They are found in the West Indies with 19 recognized species. Living specimens have a conspicuous bright red dorsal coloration.

== Species ==
Species belonging to the genus Thonalmus:

- Thonalmus abejaensis Ferreira & Ivie, 2023 – Hispaniola
- Thonalmus amabilis (Jacquelin du Val, 1857) – Cuba
- Thonalmus aulicus (Jacquelin du Val, 1857) – Cuba
- Thonalmus bicolor (Linnaeus, 1763) – Hispaniola
- Thonalmus centralis Ferreira & Ivie, 2023 – Hispaniola
- Thonalmus darlingtoni Ferreira & Ivie, 2023 – Hispaniola
- Thonalmus distinguendus (Jacquelin du Val, 1857) – Cuba
- Thonalmus dominicensis (Chevrolat, 1870) – Hispaniola
- Thonalmus guerreroi Ferreira & Ivie, 2023 – Hispaniola
- Thonalmus hubbardi Leng & Mutchler, 1922 – Montserrat
- Thonalmus humeralis Ferreira & Ivie, 2023 – Hispaniola
- Thonalmus mariani Wojciechowska and Ślipiński, 1985 – Cuba
- Thonalmus militaris (Dalman, 1817) – Jamaica
- Thonalmus milleri Ferreira & Ivie, 2023 – Puerto Rico and Hispaniola
- Thonalmus nigritarsis (Chevrolat, 1870) – Cuba
- Thonalmus sinuaticostis Leng and Mutchler, 1922 – Montserrat
- Thonalmus suavis (Jacquelin du Val, 1857) – Cuba and the Bahamas
- Thonalmus subquadratus Leng and Mutchler, 1922 – Jamaica
- Thonalmus thomasi Ferreira & Ivie, 2023 – Hispaniola

Cladogram

- - Thonalmus
    - - - Thonalmus nigritarsis
        - - - - Thonalmus suavis
              - - - Thonalmus distinguendus
                  - - - Thonalmus amabilis
                      - - Thonalmus mariani
                        - Thonalmus aulicus
      - - - - Thonalmus hubbardi
            - Thonalmus sinuaticostis
          - - Thonalmus militaris
            - Thonalmus subquadratus
    - - - Thonalmus dominicensis
        - Thonalmus milleri
      - - - - Thonalmus bicolor
            - - Thonalmus darlingtoni
              - - Thonalmus guerreroi
                - - Thonalmus humeralis
                  - Thonalmus abejaensis
        - - Thonalmus centralis
          - Thonalmus thomasi

Phylogeny of Thonalmus (Ferreira & Ivie, 2023)
