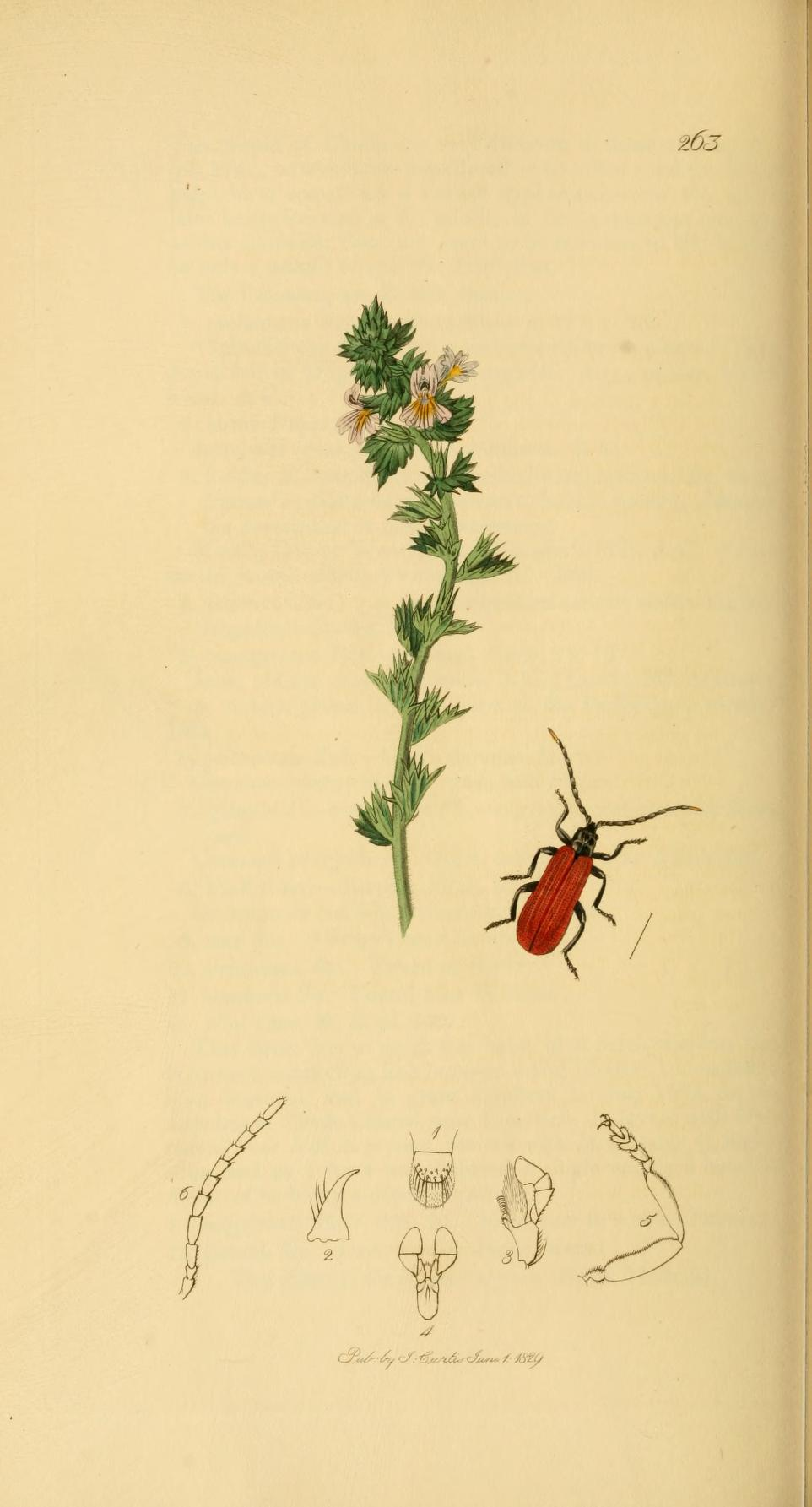
- Platycis

Scientific classification
- Kingdom: Animalia
- Phylum: Arthropoda
- Class: Insecta
- Order: Coleoptera
- Suborder: Polyphaga
- Infraorder: Elateriformia
- Family: Lycidae
- Genus: Platycis; Thomson, 1859

= Platycis =

Genus of beetles

Platycis is a genus of beetles belonging to the family Lycidae.

The species of this genus are found in Europe, Japan, Africa and North America.

Species:

- Platycis minutus (Fabricius, 1787)
- Platycis nasutus (Keisenwetter, 1874)
