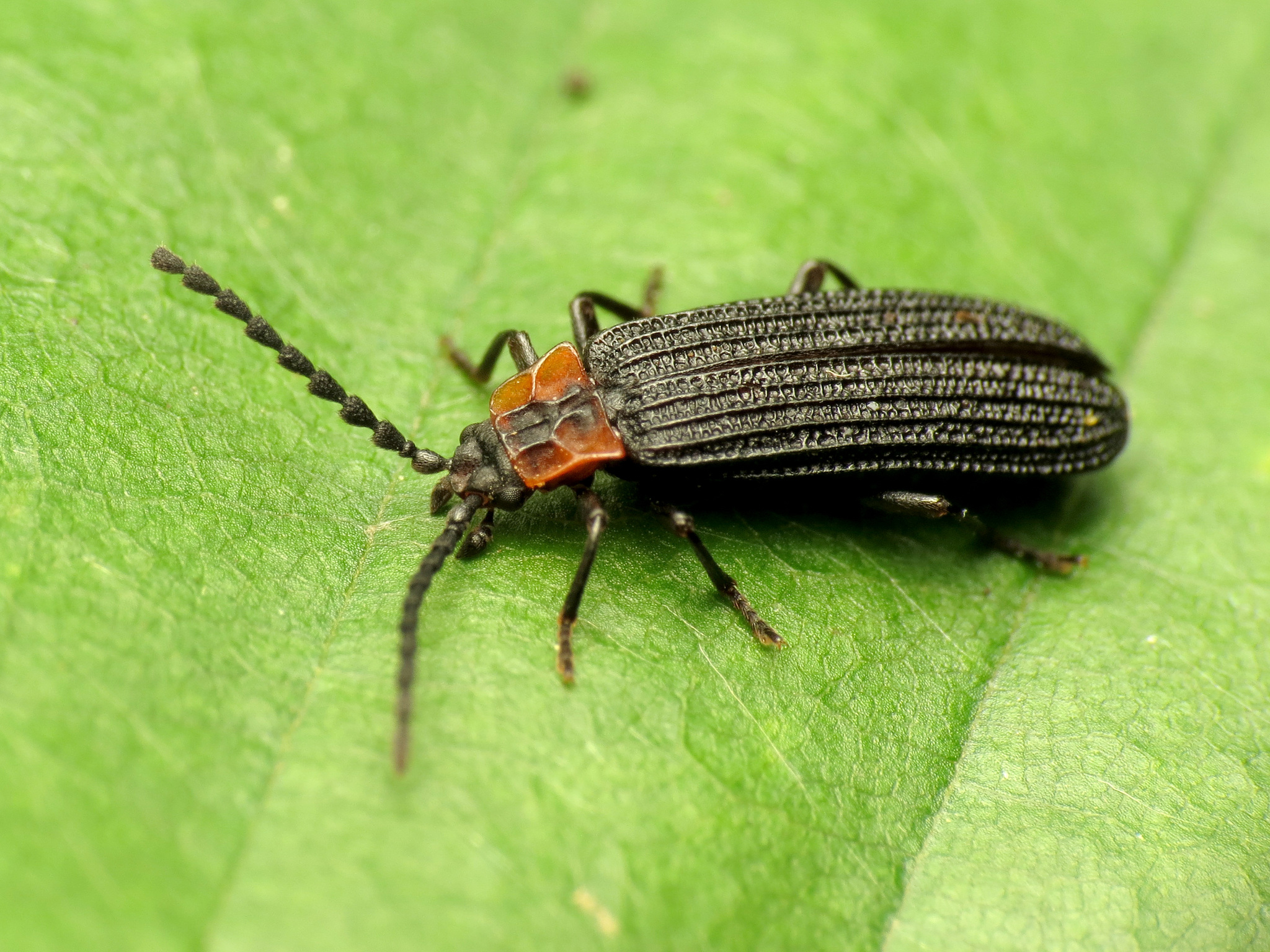
- Erotides sculptilis

Scientific classification
- Kingdom: Animalia
- Phylum: Arthropoda
- Clade: Pancrustacea
- Class: Insecta
- Order: Coleoptera
- Suborder: Polyphaga
- Infraorder: Elateriformia
- Family: Lycidae
- Genus: Erotides; Waterhouse, 1879

Synonyms
- Glabroplatycis Pic, 1914

= Erotides =

Genus of beetles

Erotides is a genus of net-winged beetles in the family Lycidae. It is placed within the subfamily Lycinae and the tribe Erotini, a diverse lineage within Lycinae characterized by aposematic coloration and mimicry complexes. Species of Erotides are distributed in the Oriental and Australasian regions and are characterized by soft bodies, reticulate elytra, and aposematic coloration.

== Description ==
Species of Erotides are medium-sized lycid beetles with elongated, somewhat flattened bodies. The elytra are strongly costate and reticulate, forming the characteristic net-like pattern typical of the family Lycidae. Like other lycid beetles, members of Erotides are chemically defended and unpalatable, and they are believed to participate in Müllerian and Batesian mimicry complexes with other beetles and insects.

== Taxonomy ==
The genus Erotides was established by Charles Owen Waterhouse in 1879 in his revision of forms within the family Lycidae. It has consistently been placed within the tribe Erotini, a group of lycid beetles noted for their frequent participation in mimicry complexes and shared aposematic colour patterns. Species limits and generic placement have been refined through regional revisions in Southeast Asia and the Papuan region, notably by Pic and Kleine in the early 20th century.

=== Taxonomic history ===
Waterhouse's original concept of Erotides was based on material from the Indo-Australian region and distinguished by strongly costate, reticulate elytra and serrate antennae. Subsequent authors, including Maurice Pic, described additional species from Southeast Asia and the Philippines, occasionally proposing separate genera for regional forms. These were later synonymised as part of broader revisions of Lycidae, particularly in the work of R. Kleine and later catalogued by Sergei V. Kazantsev. Modern classifications retain Erotides as a valid genus within Erotini, based on adult morphology and comparative studies of Lycinae lineages.

== Distribution ==
The genus is distributed in the Oriental and Australasian regions, with records from Indonesia, Malaysia, the Philippines, and Papua New Guinea.

== Biology and ecology ==
Specific biological data on Erotides are limited. In common with other Lycidae, larvae are thought to develop in decaying wood, leaf litter, or soil, where they feed on fungi or decomposing organic matter.

== Species ==
The following species are currently placed in the genus Erotides:

- Erotides costipennis Waterhouse, 1879
- Erotides flavicollis (Pic, 1921)
- Erotides sumatrensis Pic, 1921
- Erotides javanus Pic, 1921
- Erotides borneensis Pic, 1923
- Erotides luzonicus Pic, 1925
- Erotides mindanaoensis Pic, 1925
- Erotides papuanus Kleine, 1926
- Erotides celebensis Kleine, 1930
