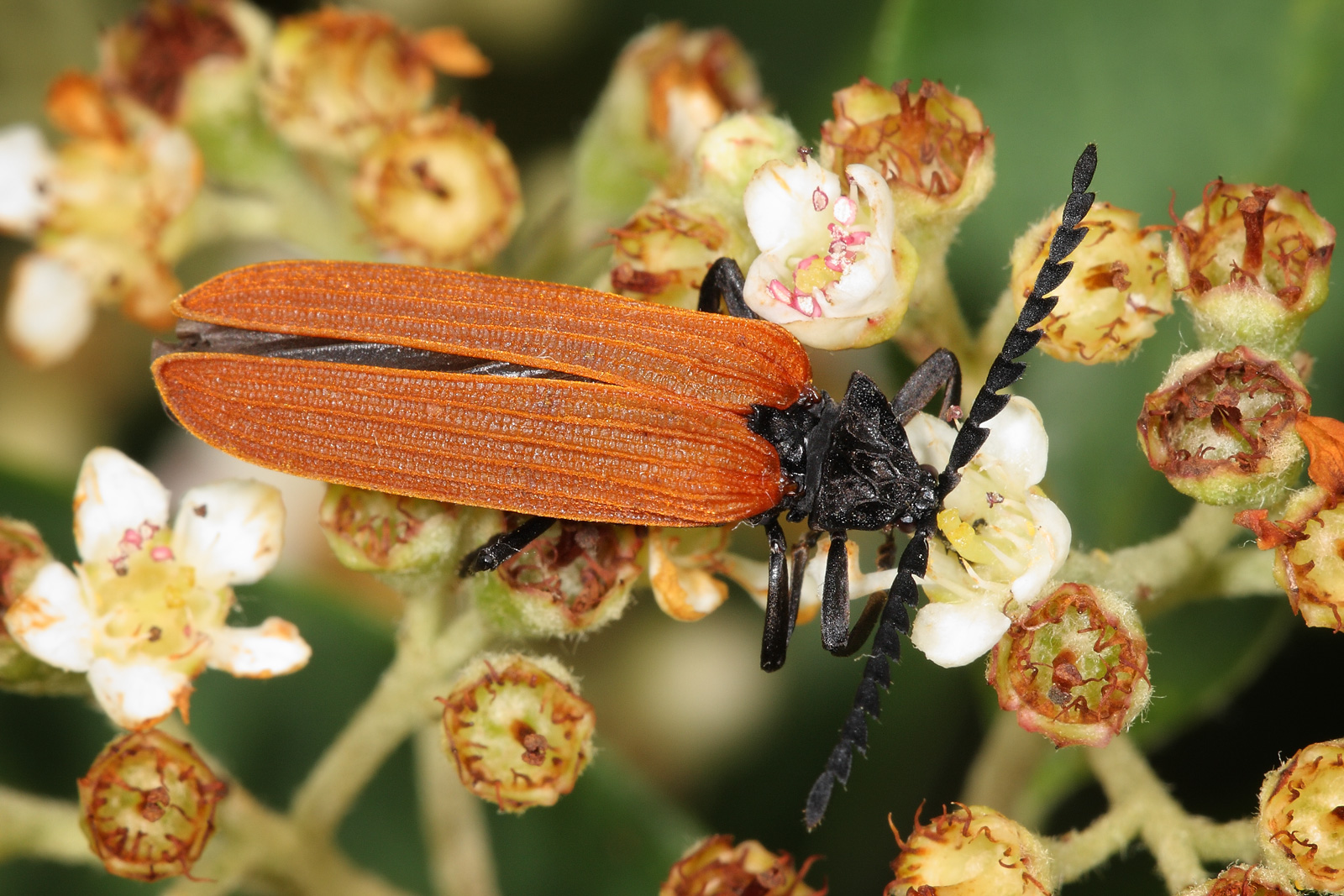
- Porrostoma rhipidium

Scientific classification
- Kingdom: Animalia
- Phylum: Arthropoda
- Clade: Pancrustacea
- Class: Insecta
- Order: Coleoptera
- Suborder: Polyphaga
- Infraorder: Elateriformia
- Superfamily: Elateroidea
- Family: Lycidae; Laporte, 1836

Subfamilies
- Ateliinae Kleine, 1929; Calochrominae Lacordaire, 1857; Erotinae LeConte, 1881; Leptolycinae Leng & Mutchler, 1922; Libnetinae Bocák & Bocáková, 1990; Lycinae Laporte de Castelnau, 1836; Lyropaeinae Bocák & Bocáková, 1989

Diversity
- >250 genera >900 species

= Lycidae =

Lycidae Temporal range: Cenomanian–Recent

Family of beetles

The Lycidae are a family in the beetle order Coleoptera, members of which are commonly called net-winged beetles. These beetles are cosmopolitan, being found in Nearctic, Palearctic, Neotropical, Afrotropical, Oriental, and Australian ecoregions.

== Description ==
Beetles of this family are elongated and usually found on flowers or stems. Adult males are about 10–15 mm in length, while females are a bit larger. The adults of some species are nectarivores, while some may have short adult lives during which they may not feed at all. The head is triangular and the antennae are long, thick, and serrated. Most of them are brick-red in colour. They are protected from predators by being toxic.

In several lineages, females retain a larval shape as adults (larviform females).

Although older literature reports the larvae to be predatory, the most common mode of feeding is probably microphagy on myxomycetes or metabolic products of fungi. Some Lycidae larvae might be found preying on soft larvae of Diptera or small molluscs.

== Genera ==
Selected genera belonging to the family Lycidae:

- Acroleptus Bourgeois, 1886^{g}
- Adoceta Bourgeois, 1882^{i c g}
- Alyculus Kasantsev, 1999^{g}
- Benibotarus Kono, 1932^{i c g}
- Brasilycus do Nascimento & Bocáková, 2010^{g}
- Bulenides Waterhouse, 1879^{g}
- Caenia Newman, 1838^{i c g b}
- Calcaeron Kazantsev, 2004^{g}
- Calochromus Guérin Méneville, 1833^{i c g b}
- Calopteron Laporte, 1838^{i c g b}
- Caloptognatha Green, 1954^{i c g}
- Cartagonum Pic, 1922^{g}
- Cautires Waterhouse, 1879^{g}
- Ceratoprion Gorham, 1884^{g}
- Cessator Kazantsev, 2009^{g}
- Cladophorus Guérin-Méneville, 1830^{g}
- Conderis Waterhouse, 1879^{g}
- Cyrtopteron Bourgeois, 1905^{g}
- Dexoris Waterhouse, 1878^{g}
- Diatrichalus Kleine, 1926^{g}
- Dictyoptera Latreille, 1829^{i c g b}
- Dihammatus Waterhouse, 1879^{g}
- Dilophotes Waterhouse, 1879^{g}
- Ditoneces Waterhouse, 1879^{g}
- Duliticola Mjöberg, 1925^{g}
- Electropteron Kazantsev, 2012^{g}
- Emplectus Erichson, 1847^{g}
- Eniclases Waterhouse, 1879^{g}
- Eropterus Green, 1951^{i c g b}
- Eros Newman, 1838^{i c g b}
- Erotides Waterhouse, 1879^{g b}
- Falsocaenia Pic, 1922^{g}
- Falsocalleros Pic, 1933^{i c g}
- Falsotrichalus Pic, 1921^{g}
- Flabellodilophotes Pic, 1912^{g}
- Flabellotrichalus Pic, 1921^{g}
- Greenarus Kazantsev, 1995^{g b}
- Haplobothris Bourgeois, 1879^{g}
- Helcophorus Fairmaire, 1891^{g}
- Hiekeolycus Winkler, 1987^{g}
- Idiopteron Bourgeois, 1905^{i c g}
- Kolibacium Winkler, 1987^{g}
- Laterialis (Laterialis)^{g}
- Leptoceletes Green, 1952^{i c g b}
- Leptotrichalus Kleine, 1925^{g}
- Libnetis Kleine, 1930^{g}
- Libnetisia Pic, 1921^{g}
- Libnetomorphus Pic, 1921^{g}
- Lipernes Waterhouse, 1879^{g}
- Lolodorfus Bocakova, 2014^{g}
- Lopheros Leconte, 1881^{i c g b}
- Lucaina Dugés, 1878^{i c g b}
- Lycomorphon Pic, 1922^{g}
- Lyconotus Green, 1949^{i c g b}
- Lycoprogentes Pic, 1915^{g}
- Lycostomus Motschulsky, 1861^{g}
- Lycus Fabricius, 1787^{i c g b}
- Lygistopterus Dejean, 1833^{i c g b}
- Lyponia Waterhouse, 1878^{g}
- Lyropaeus Waterhouse, 1878^{g}
- Macrolycus Waterhouse, 1878^{g}
- Macrolygistopterus Pic, 1929^{g}
- Melampyrus Waterhouse, 1879^{g}
- Melaneros Fairmaire, 1879^{i c g}
- Mesolycus Gorham, 1883^{g}
- Mesopteron Bourgeois, 1905^{g}
- Metanoeus Waterhouse, 1879^{g}
- Metapteron Bourgeois, 1905^{g}
- Metriorrhynchoides Kleine, 1926^{g}
- Metriorrhynchus Gemminger et Harold, 1869
- Neolyrium Kazantsev, 2005^{g}
- Ochinoeus Kubecek, Bray & Bocak, 2015^{g}
- Pietrzeniukia Winkler, 1987^{g}
- Platerodrilus Pic, 1921^{g}
- Plateros Bourgeois, 1879^{i c g b}
- Platycis Thomson, 1864^{i c g}
- Ponyalis Fairmaire, 1900^{g}
- Porrostoma Laporte, 1838^{g}
- Procautires Kleine, 1925^{g}
- Propyropterus Nakane, 1968^{g}
- Protaphes Kleine, 1926^{g}
- Proteros Kazantsev, 2004^{g}
- Protolopheros Kazantsev, 2013^{g}
- Pseudacroleptus Pic, 1911^{g}
- Pseudoplateros Green, 1951^{g}
- Pseudosynchonnus Pic, 1922^{g}
- Punicealis Kazantsev, 1990^{g b}
- Pyropterus Mulsant, 1838^{g}
- Scarelus Waterhouse, 1878^{g}
- Sulabanus Dvorak & Bocak, 2007^{g}
- Synchonnus Waterhouse, 1879^{g}
- Taphes Waterhouse, 1878^{g}
- Taphomimus Kasantsev, 1996^{g}
- Thonalmus Bourgeois, 1884^{g}
- Trichalus Waterhouse, 1877^{g}
- Xylobanellus Kleine, 1930^{g}
- Xylobanus Waterhouse, 1879^{g}

Data sources: i=ITIS, c=Catalogue of Life, g=GBIF, b=Bugguide.net

=== Extinct genera ===
†Burmolycus Bocak et al. 2019 Burmese amber, Cenomanian

†Cretolycus Tihelka et al. 2019 Burmese amber, Cenomanian

†Electropteron Kazantsev 2012 Dominican amber, Miocene

†Miocaenia Wickham 1914 Florissant Formation, Eocene

== Gallery ==
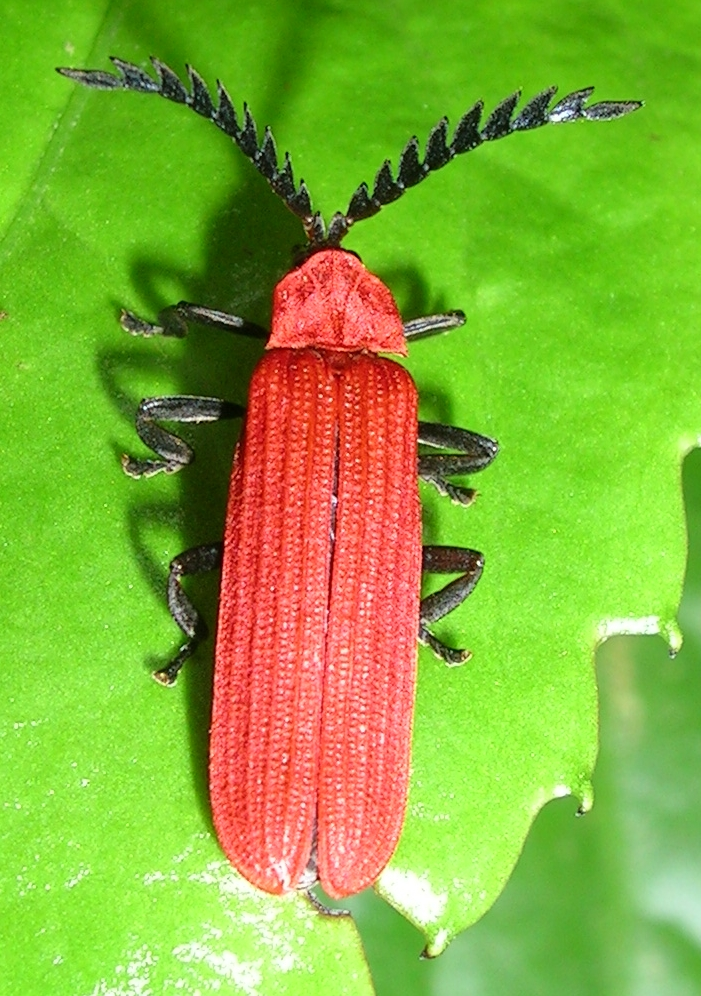
A lycid from India

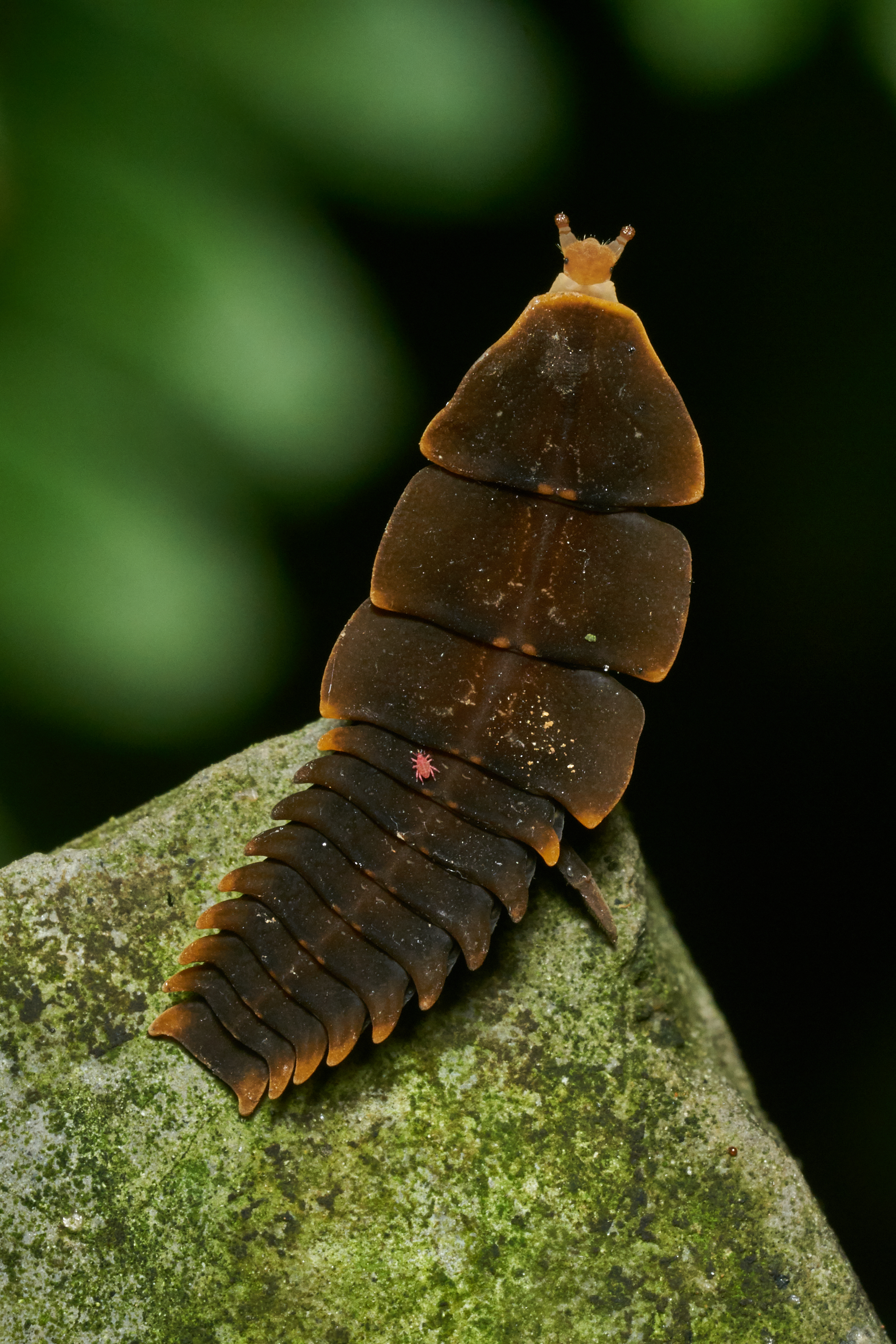
A lycid larva or larviform female

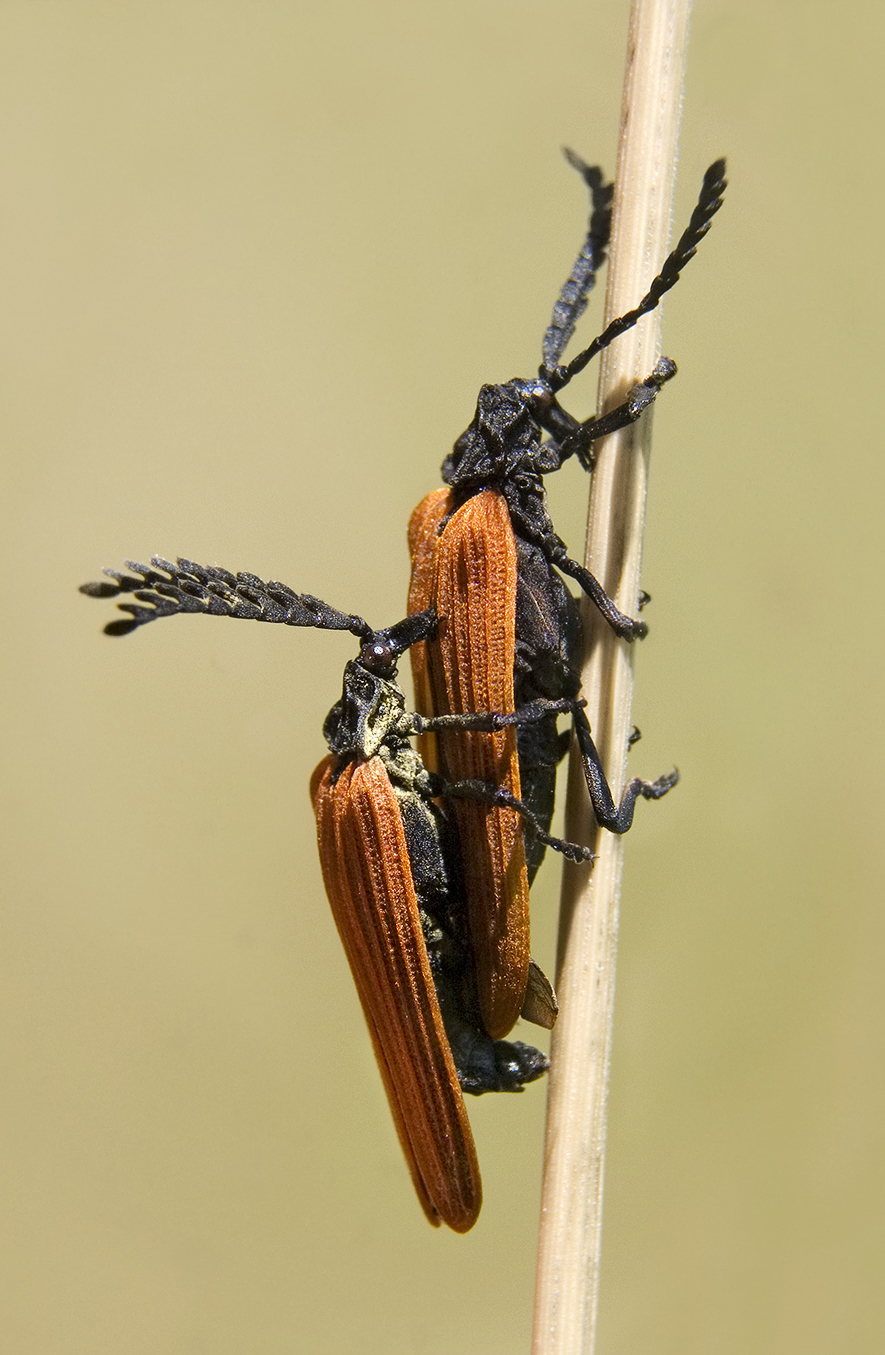
Mating Porrostoma rhipidium

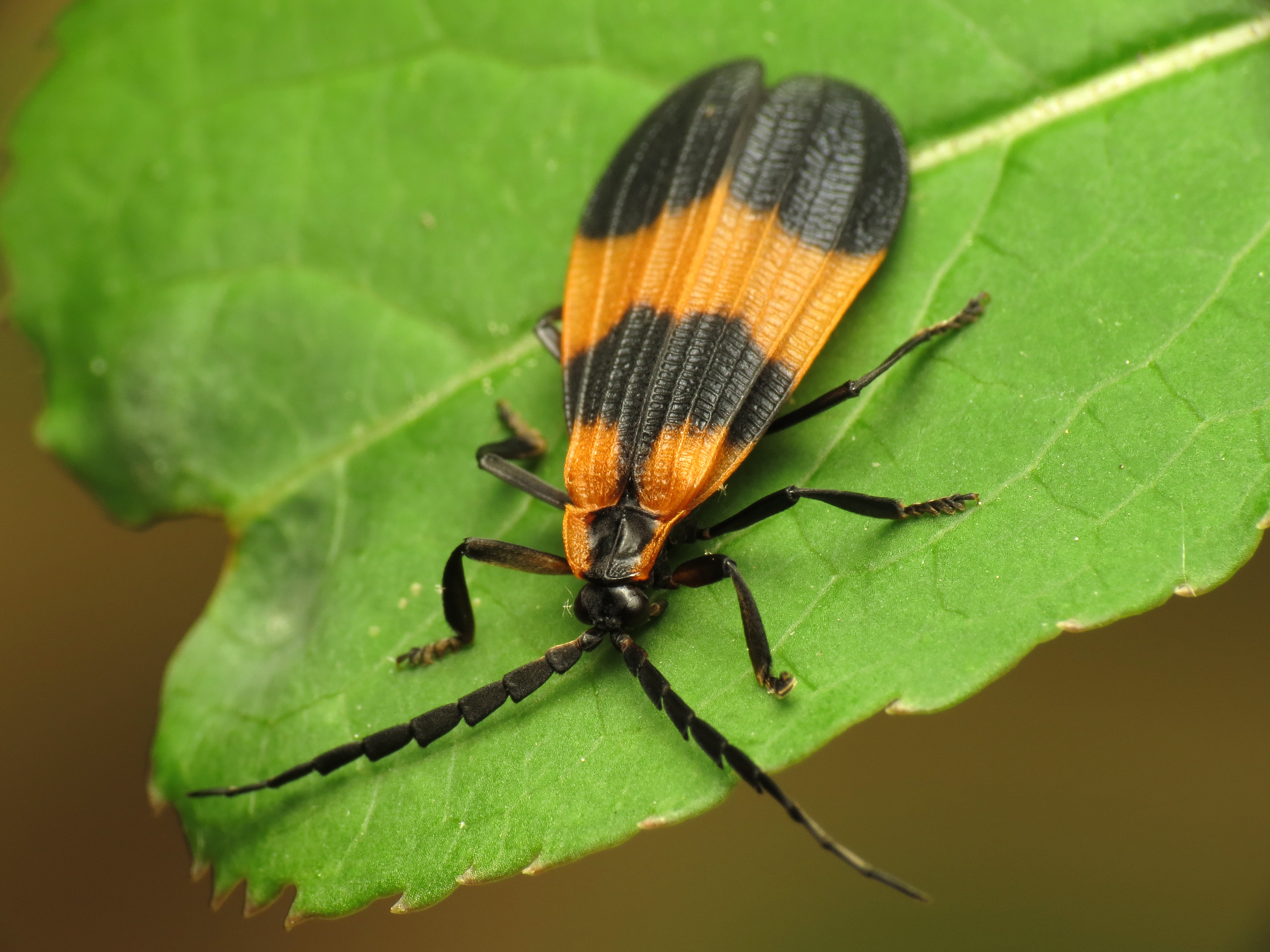
Calopteron reticulatum

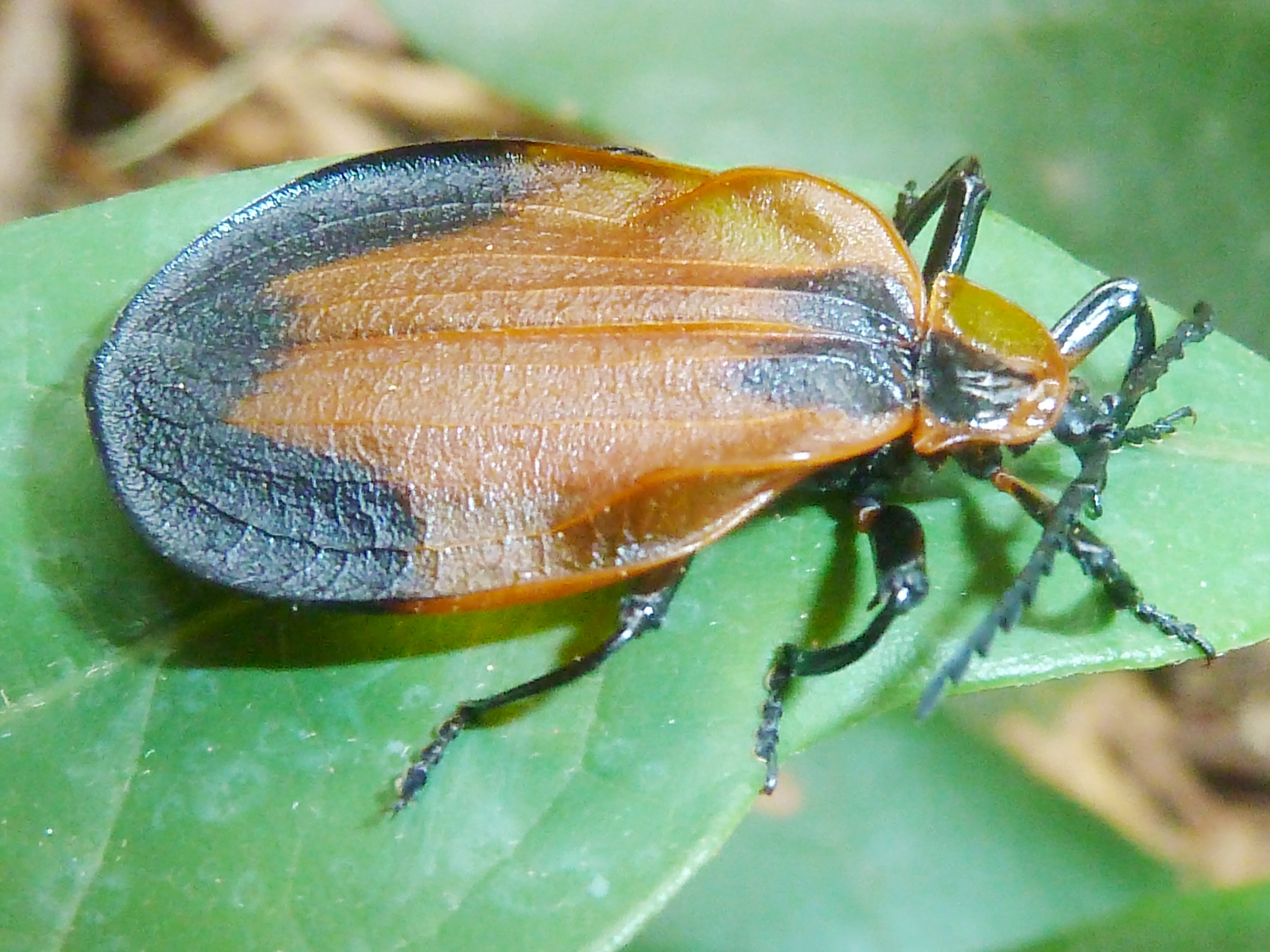
Lycus rostratus

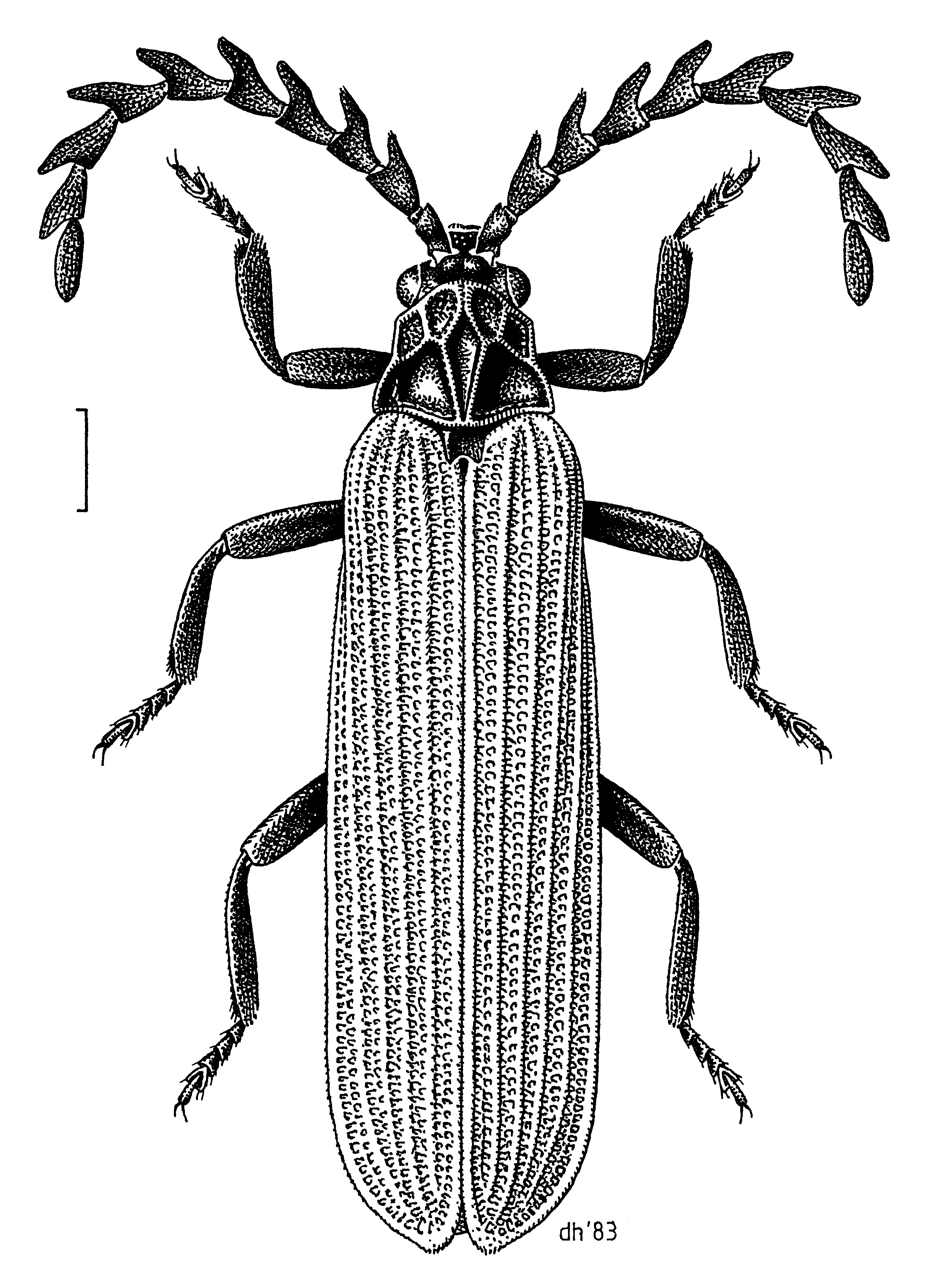
Red-winged lycid beetle Porrostoma rufipenne

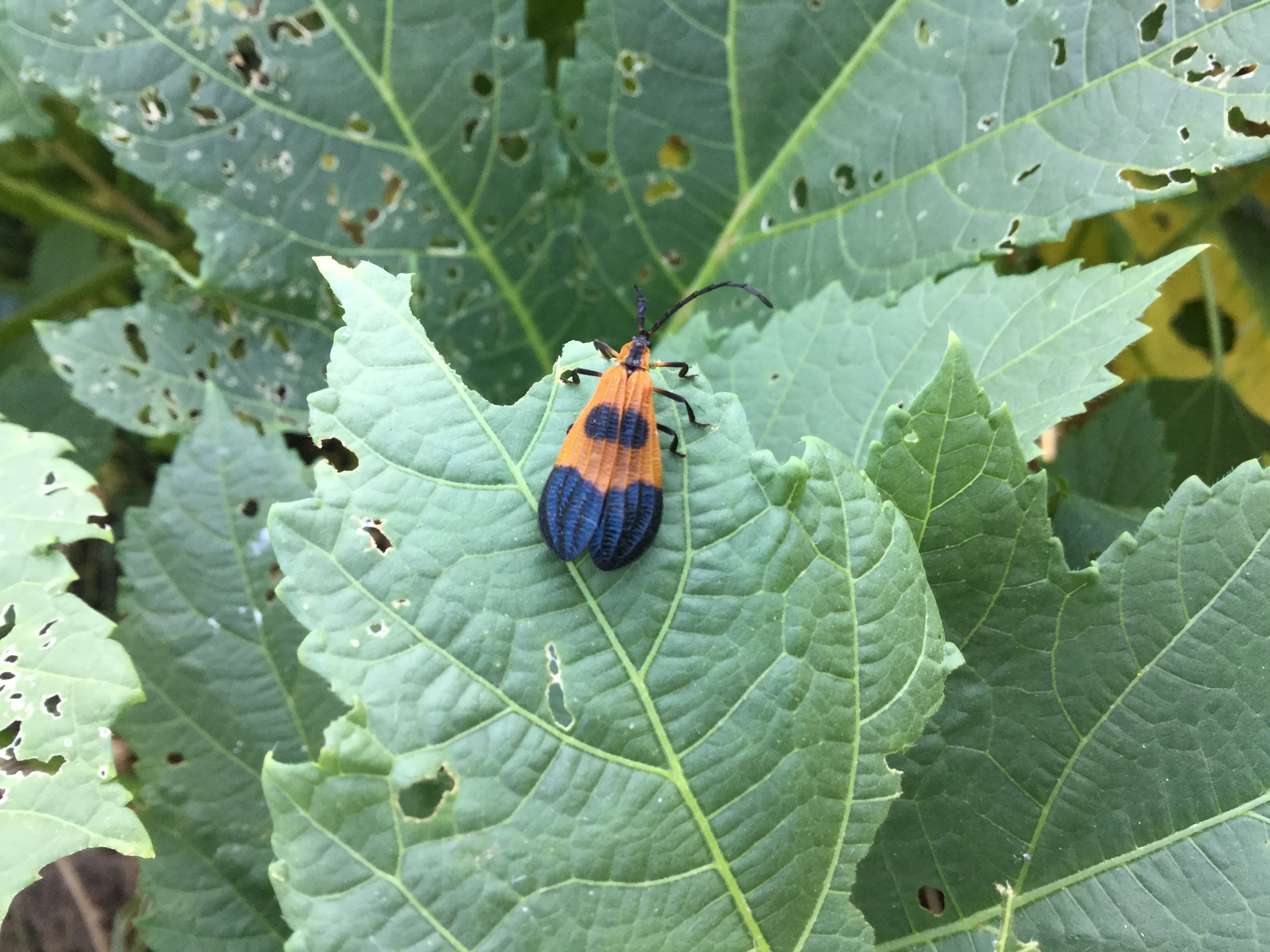
Calopteron reticulatum in Oklahoma
