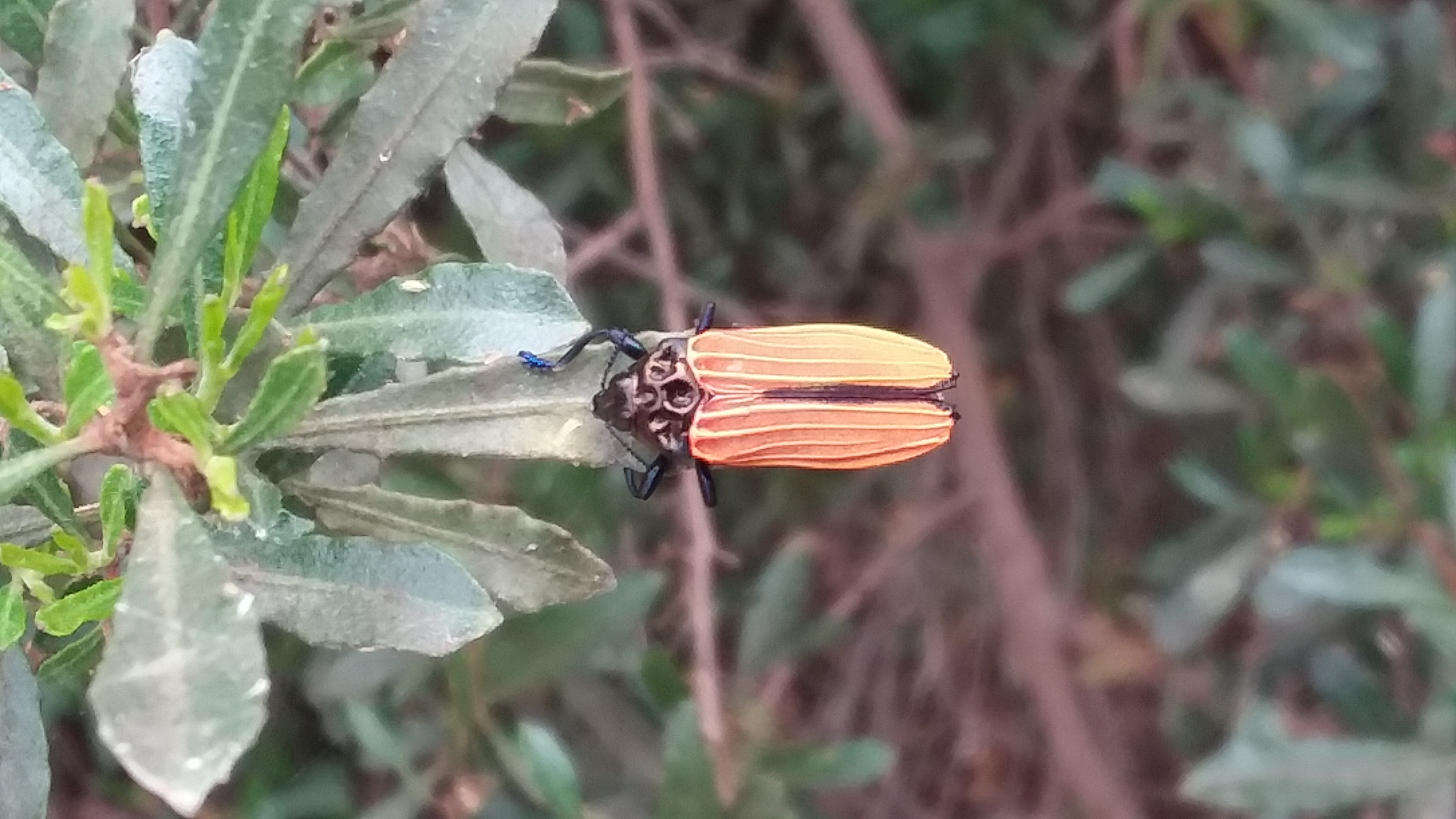

Scientific classification
- Domain: Eukaryota
- Kingdom: Animalia
- Phylum: Arthropoda
- Class: Insecta
- Order: Coleoptera
- Suborder: Polyphaga
- Infraorder: Elateriformia
- Family: Buprestidae
- Genus: Castiarina
- Species: C. nasuta

Binomial name
- Castiarina nasuta (Saunders, 1869)

= Castiarina nasuta =

Species of beetle

Castiarina nasuta is a species of beetle in the Buprestidae family, which is endemic to Australia and found along the east coast of Australia between Melbourne and Brisbane. It is one of several Jewel Beetles that exhibits Batesian mimicry of Lycid Beetles in the genus Porrostoma as the Lycid Beetles taste vile to predators. C. nasuta can be distinguished from similar species such as C. erythroptera, C. rufipennis and C. subpura by having a crinkly looking pronotum. It is typically found in flowering shrubs such as Leptospermum and Bursaria.
