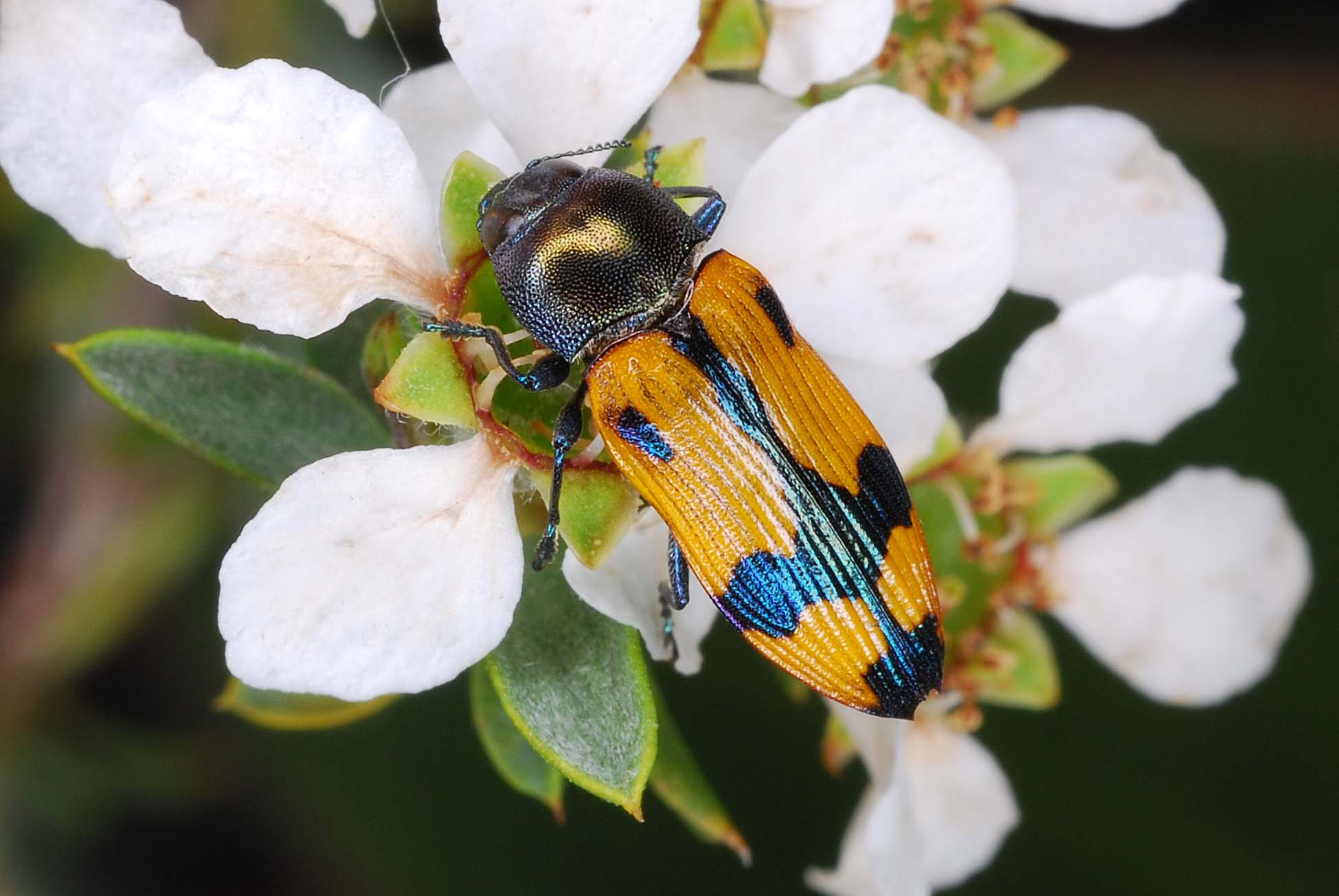
- Adult on the flowers of a Leptospermum sp., Goobang Range, New South Wales, Australia

Scientific classification
- Kingdom: Animalia
- Phylum: Arthropoda
- Clade: Pancrustacea
- Class: Insecta
- Order: Coleoptera
- Suborder: Polyphaga
- Infraorder: Elateriformia
- Family: Buprestidae
- Genus: Castiarina
- Species: C. allensundholmi

Binomial name
- Castiarina allensundholmi Barker, 2005

= Castiarina allensundholmi =

Species of beetle

Castiarina allensundholmi is a species of beetle in the family Buprestidae, otherwise known as jewel beetles. The species was discovered in October 2003, and was described by Dr Shelley Barker, OAM (Medal of the Order of Australia), in 2005. The three specimens in the type series measure from 7 mm to 8.2 mm. The species belongs in the Castiarina balteata species group which currently comprises three similarly-sized described species: Castiarina balteata (Saunders, 1869), Castiarina williamsi (Barker, 1988), and Castiarina allensundholmi (Barker, 2005).

== Etymology ==
Castiarina allensundholmi was named for entomological enthusiast and co-discover of this species, Allen Michael Sundholm, OAM. Sundholm was awarded the Medal of the Order of Australia (OAM) in 2016 for his major significant role in the early 1980s for saving from clearing 3 million hectares of mallee, mallee-heath and woodlands in what is now known as the incredibly ecologically rich and diverse Great Western Woodlands in Western Australia.

== Distribution ==
=== Spatial ===
==== Geographic ====
As of October 2015, this species is known to inhabit only two geographical localities:

1. Prior to October 2015, only three specimens were known. The three specimens in the type series were found by Alex Scott, Allen Sundholm, and Joe Bugeja in October 2003. These were found west of Euabalong West, Lachlan Plains, central New South Wales, Australia.
2. Twelve years later, in October 2015, Allen Michael Sundholm found two specimens in the Goobang Range, New South Wales. This locality extended the known range of the species 200 km to the east.

The species likely has a larger geographic distribution, but this cannot be confirmed without considerable additional field work. Despite considerable research undertaken by entomological enthusiasts in the areas to the west of the Euabalong West sites since 1980, no further specimens have been found, indicating that the Euabalong West sites (which are ecotonal between mallee habitats to the west and open woodlands to the east) may be at or near the western geographic limit for this species.

==== Altitudinal ====
The altitude where the three specimens in the type series were found averages 170 m above the 2015 sea level. The altitude of the Goobang Range locality is 565 m above the 2015 sea level.

=== Temporal ===
All five known adult specimens were found during October, varying from early to late in the month.

The occurrence of emerged and active adult specimens at any particular site may vary several weeks earlier or later than typical for that site from one season to the next, due to natural variability in the seasons.

== Habitat dependencies ==
The Euabalong West site is within the IBRA7 Cobar Penneplain (IBRA7 code COP) bioregion, and at the extreme south-western corner of the Nymagee (IBRA7 code COP04) sub-bioregion. The Goobang Range locality is within the IBRA7 New South Wales Inland Slopes (IBRA7 code NSS) bioregion, and within the Inland Slopes (IBRA7 code NSS01) sub-bioregion.

Note that, for the most part, IBRA region and IBRA subregion boundaries are indicative only. In many areas the abutting habitat types and micro-habitat types are either ecotonal or interdigitate to a degree that is too impractical to map. In other areas the severe or even total loss of habitat due to land clearing makes defining pre-human-habitation boundaries difficult, requiring a higher reliance on soil types.

The plant community at the Euabalong West locality is an ecotonal remnant between an endangered complex of mallee habitats to the west and endangered remnant box woodlands to the east. Some of the mallee habitats to the west are protected with nature reserves. The plant community at the Goobang Range locality is an open woodland dominated by Callitris endlicheri (black cypress pine). Some of the surviving habitats of the Goobang Range are protected within Goobang National Park.

== Biology ==
=== Early stages (ova, larva, pupa) ===
As with most species of Australian Buprestidae, nothing is known of the early stages of this species, including the other two species in the Castiarina balteata species group. Not only are the early stages of Castiarina allensundholmi unknown, but the larval host plant(s) are also unknown, as is the time it takes to complete its life cycle from one generation to the next. The adult host plant at the Euabalong West locality, Micromyrtus sessilis, does not occur at the Goobang Range site, but may occur nearby. The adult host plant at the Goobang Range site, an undetermined species in Leptospermum, does not occur at or near the Euabalong West site.

Identification of the larval host plant(s) of Castiarina allensundholmi would assist delineating its geographic range and habitat requirements. Identification of the larval host plant(s) of the two other known species in the Castiarina balteata species group may also be of help. However, there are currently no public resources allocated to identifying the larval host plants of any Australian Buprestid species.

=== Adult (imago) ===
The five known adult specimens of this species were collected from the flowers of Micromyrtus sessilis (near Euabalong West, NSW), and an unidentified species in Leptospermum (Goobang Range, NSW). As is typical for species in Castiarina, the adults of this species are doubtless nectarivorous, feeding on the nectar of the adult host plants when in peak bloom. They may also feed on the petals.

Environmental factors such as climatic conditions, such as the amount and seasonal timing of rainfall, may either inhibit adult emergence or trigger pupation followed by adult emergence.

== Threats ==
=== Habitat loss ===
If the two known localities for this species are any guide, then there has been severe loss of this species' habitat since human settlement. Continued land clearance in its known range, particularly the two known sites (neither of which lies within a nature conservation reserve), would likely be detrimental to its survival.

=== Climate change ===
No studies have been published to assess the impact of climate change on this species, nor on any other species in the Australian Buprestid fauna, which comprises at least 1,600 species. However, given the very limited habitat within its known geographic range, rapid climate change beyond the climate variations this species can consistently withstand would likely be detrimental to its survival.
