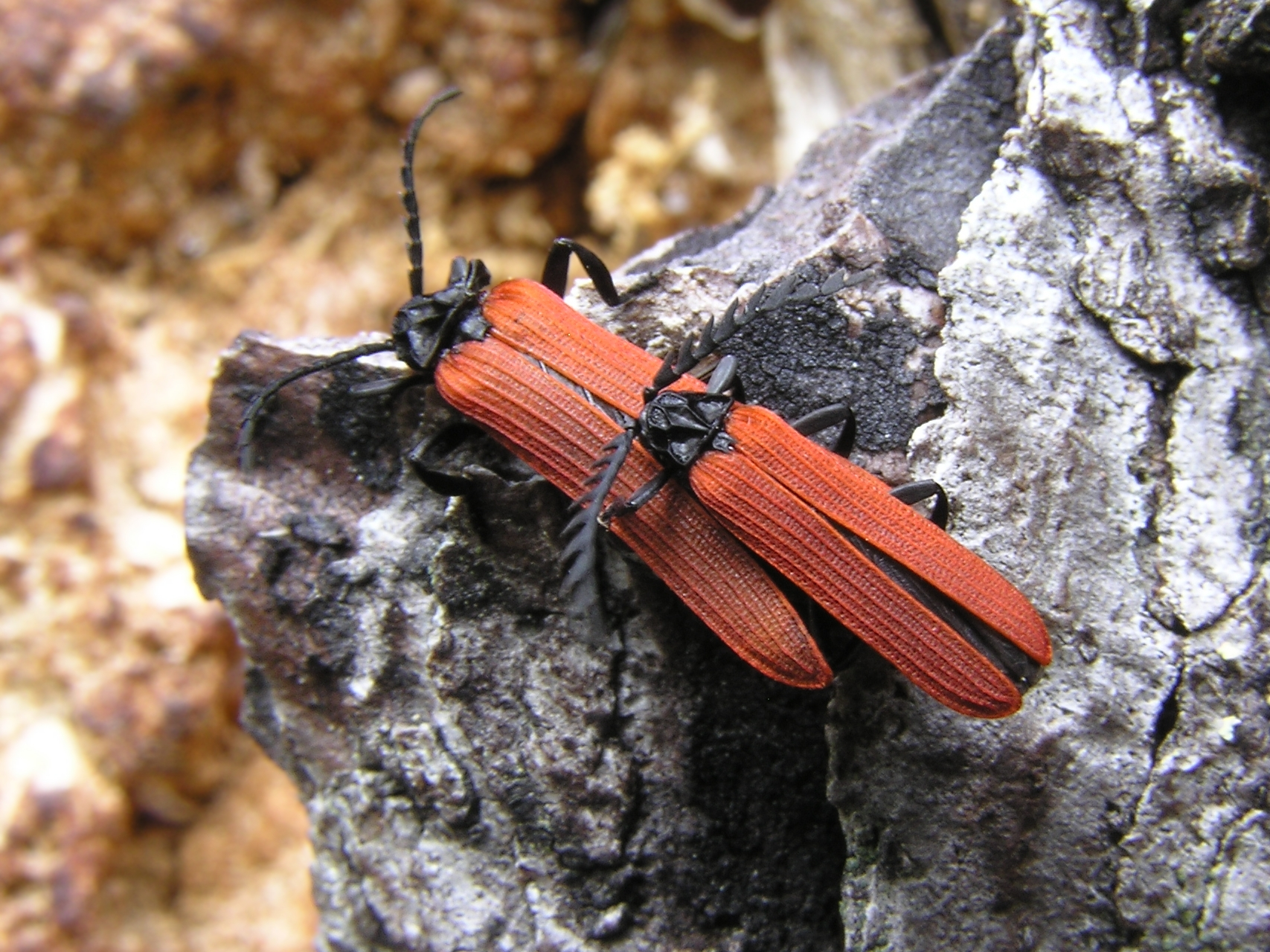
- Adults
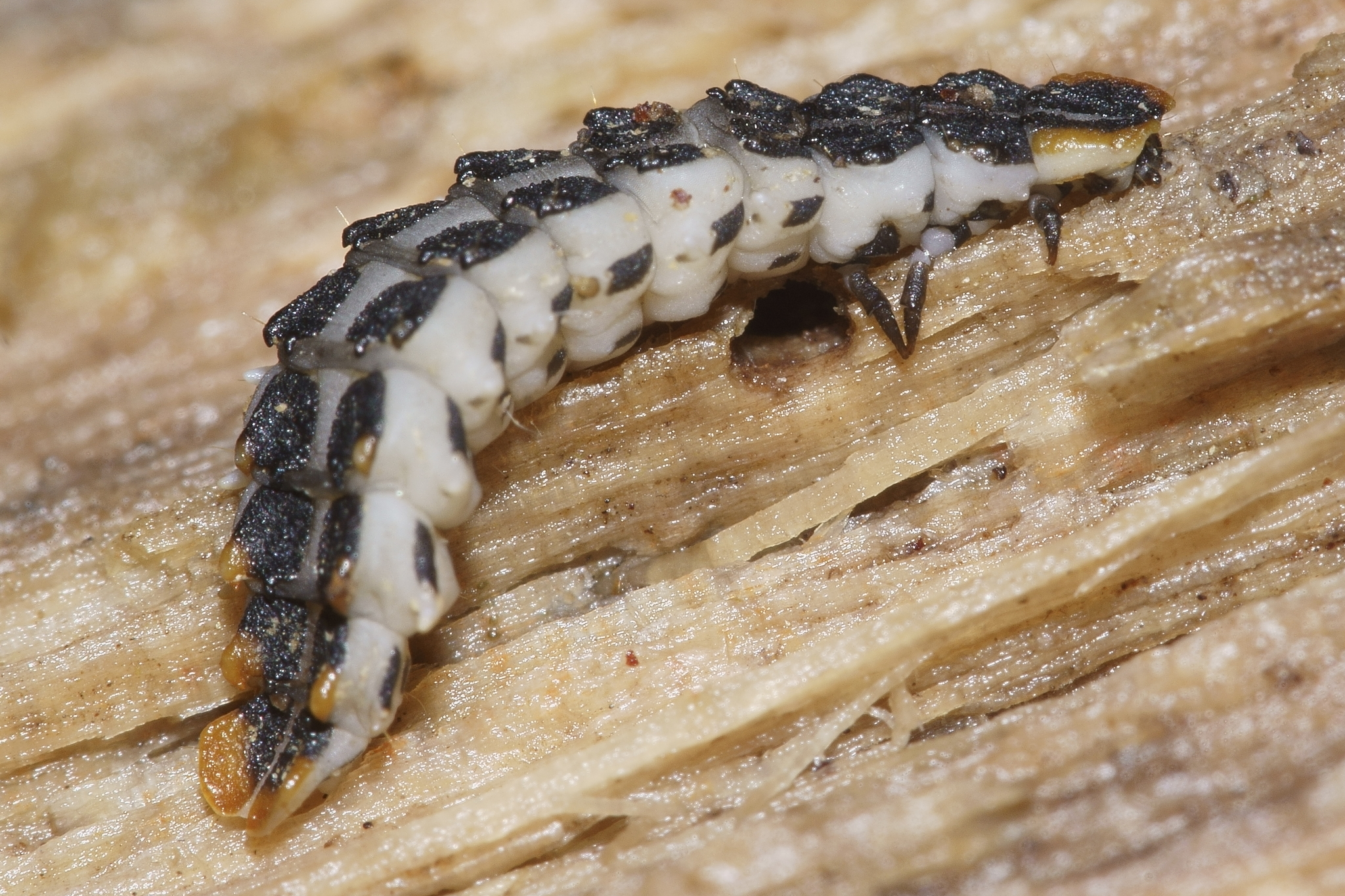
- Larva

Scientific classification
- Kingdom: Animalia
- Phylum: Arthropoda
- Class: Insecta
- Order: Coleoptera
- Suborder: Polyphaga
- Infraorder: Elateriformia
- Family: Lycidae
- Genus: Porrostoma
- Species: P. rufipenne

Binomial name
- Porrostoma rufipenne Fabricius 1801

= Porrostoma rufipenne =

Species of beetle

Porrostoma rufipenne is a species of beetle in the genus Porrostoma. It was first described by Johan Christian Fabricius in 1801.

== Description ==
It is of medium size, and is a bright red or orange colour with thick antennae containing "leaves" along them.

== Range ==
It is found in Australia and New Zealand.

== Ecology ==
Their bright colors may serve as a warning to potential predators.
