= Castiarina insculpta =

Scientific classification
- Kingdom: Animalia
- Phylum: Arthropoda
- Class: Insecta
- Order: Coleoptera
- Suborder: Polyphaga
- Infraorder: Elateriformia
- Family: Buprestidae
- Genus: Castiarina
- Species: C. insculpta

Binomial name
- Castiarina insculpta (Carter, 1934)

Species of beetle

Castiarina insculpta, the Miena jewel beetle, is a species of beetle in the jewel beetle family, Buprestidae. It is endemic to Tasmania, where it feeds on the asteraceous shrub Ozothamnus hookeri.
