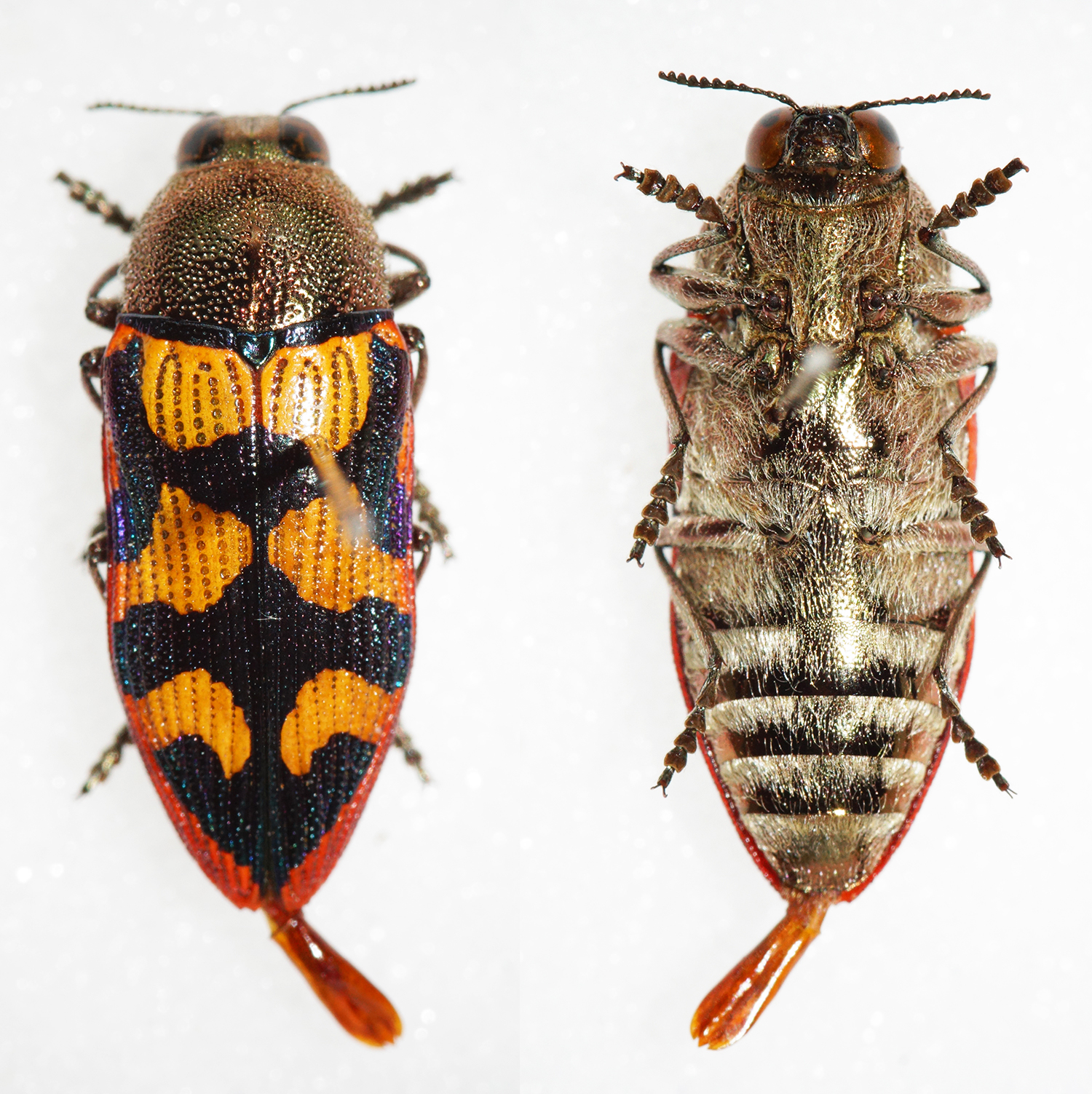
- (female)
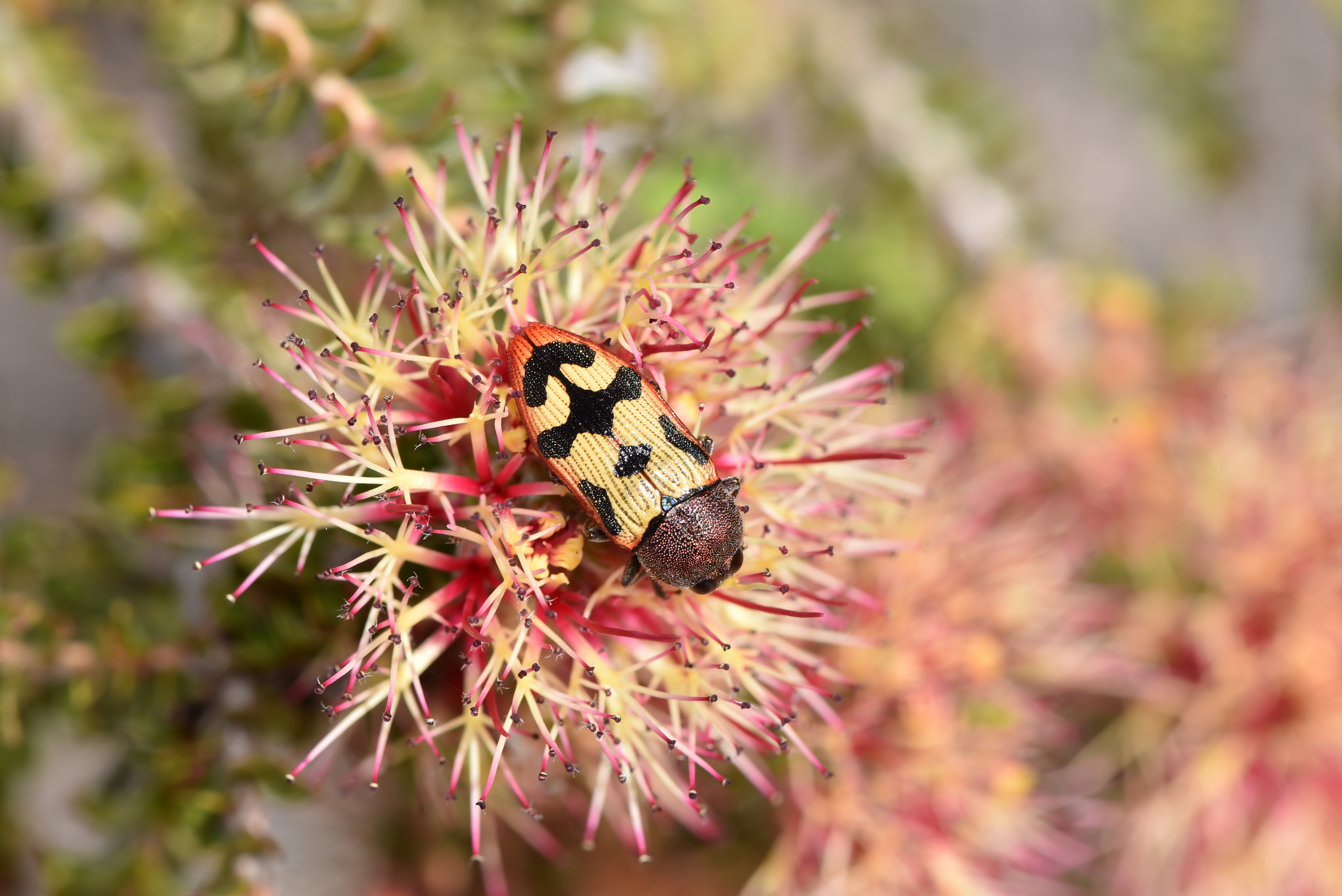
- C. simulata ssp. phryne on Beaufortia bicolor

Scientific classification
- Kingdom: Animalia
- Phylum: Arthropoda
- Clade: Pancrustacea
- Class: Insecta
- Order: Coleoptera
- Suborder: Polyphaga
- Infraorder: Elateriformia
- Family: Buprestidae
- Genus: Castiarina
- Species: C. simulata

Binomial name
- Castiarina simulata (Gory & Laporte, 1838)

= Castiarina simulata =

Species of beetle

Castiarina simulata is a species of beetle in the jewel beetle family, Buprestidae, found in Western Australia, South Australia and Victoria.

It was first described by Hippolyte Louis Gory and Francis de Laporte de Castelnau in 1838 as Stigmodera simulata from a specimen found on the Swan River.

Adult beetles are diurnal and feed on the flowers of Myrtaceae. The larvae are wood borers.
