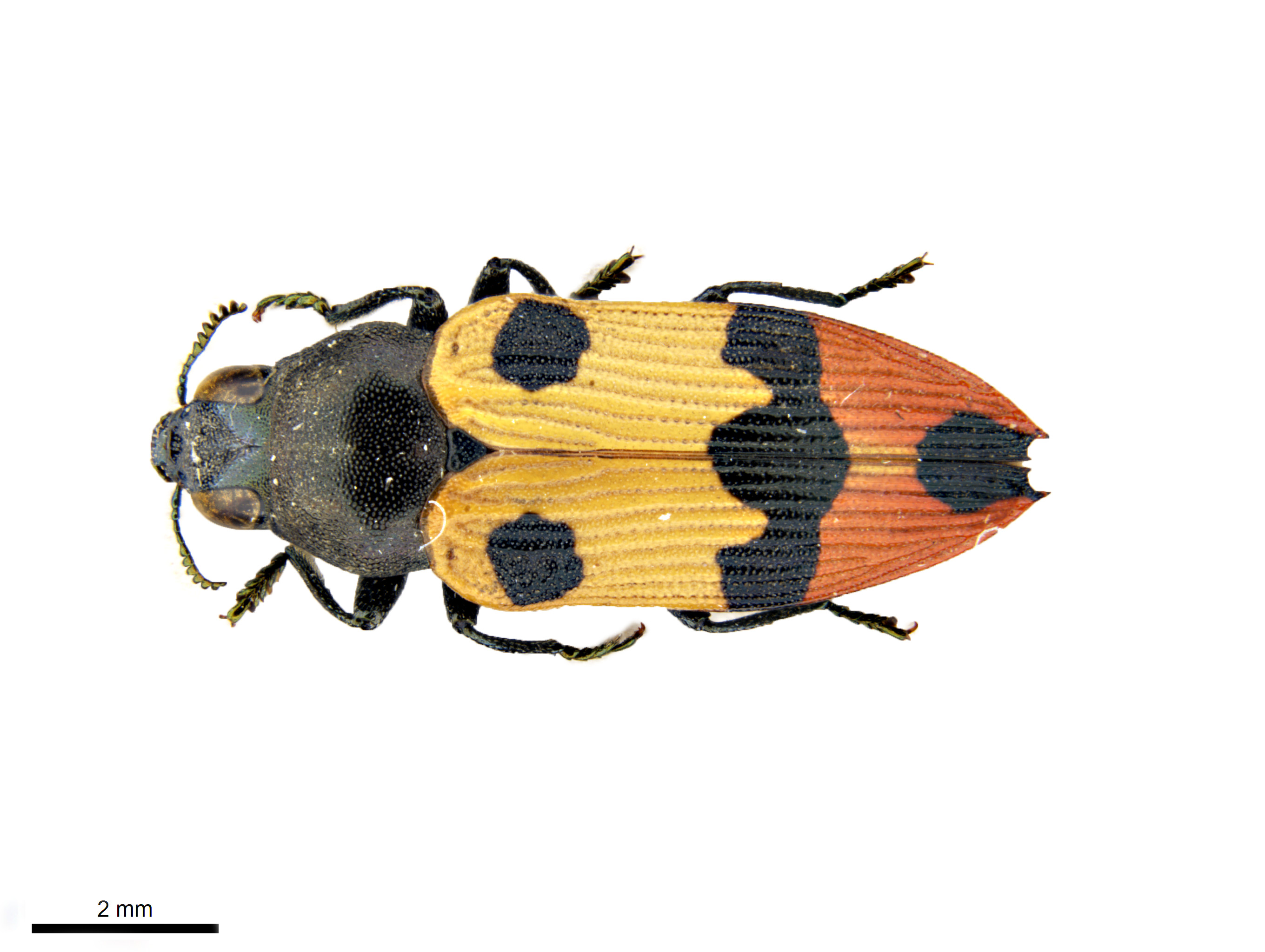

Scientific classification
- Domain: Eukaryota
- Kingdom: Animalia
- Phylum: Arthropoda
- Class: Insecta
- Order: Coleoptera
- Suborder: Polyphaga
- Infraorder: Elateriformia
- Family: Buprestidae
- Genus: Castiarina
- Species: C. festiva

Binomial name
- Castiarina festiva (Carter, 1916)

= Castiarina festiva =

Species of beetle

Castiarina festiva is a species of beetle in the jewel beetle family, Buprestidae, found in Australia.
