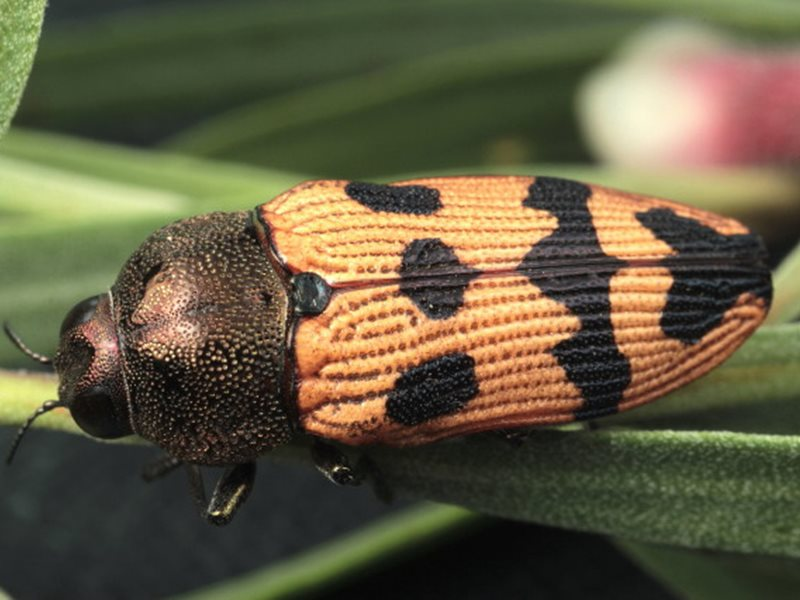

Scientific classification
- Kingdom: Animalia
- Phylum: Arthropoda
- Class: Insecta
- Order: Coleoptera
- Suborder: Polyphaga
- Infraorder: Elateriformia
- Family: Buprestidae
- Genus: Castiarina
- Species: C. turneri

Binomial name
- Castiarina turneri (Barker, 1983)

= Castiarina turneri =

Species of beetle

Castiarina turneri Barker 1983 is a beetle (Order Coleoptera) in the Family Buprestidae, otherwise known as jewel beetles. The species was described by Dr Shelley Barker, OAM (Medallion of the Order of Australia), in 1983.

== Distribution ==
South Australia, Victoria and NSW.

== Citation ==
Castiarina turneri Barker, 1983
