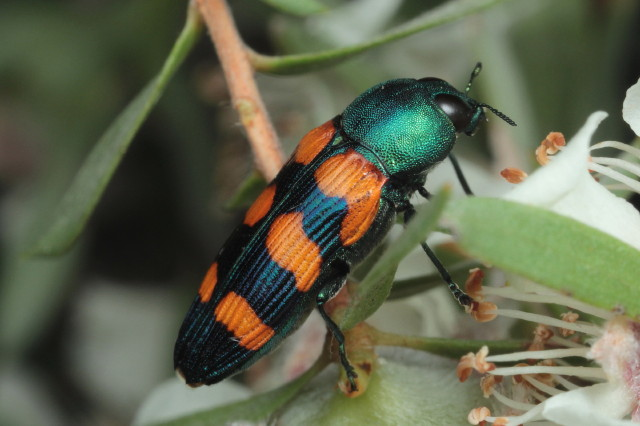

Scientific classification
- Kingdom: Animalia
- Phylum: Arthropoda
- Class: Insecta
- Order: Coleoptera
- Suborder: Polyphaga
- Infraorder: Elateriformia
- Family: Buprestidae
- Genus: Castiarina
- Species: C. vegeta

Binomial name
- Castiarina vegeta (Hope, 1847)

= Castiarina vegeta =

Species of beetle

Castiarina vegeta is a beetle (Order Coleoptera) in the Family Buprestidae, otherwise known as jewel beetles. The species was described by Hope in 1847.

== Distribution ==
South Australia, Victoria.

== Citation ==
Castiarina vegeta
