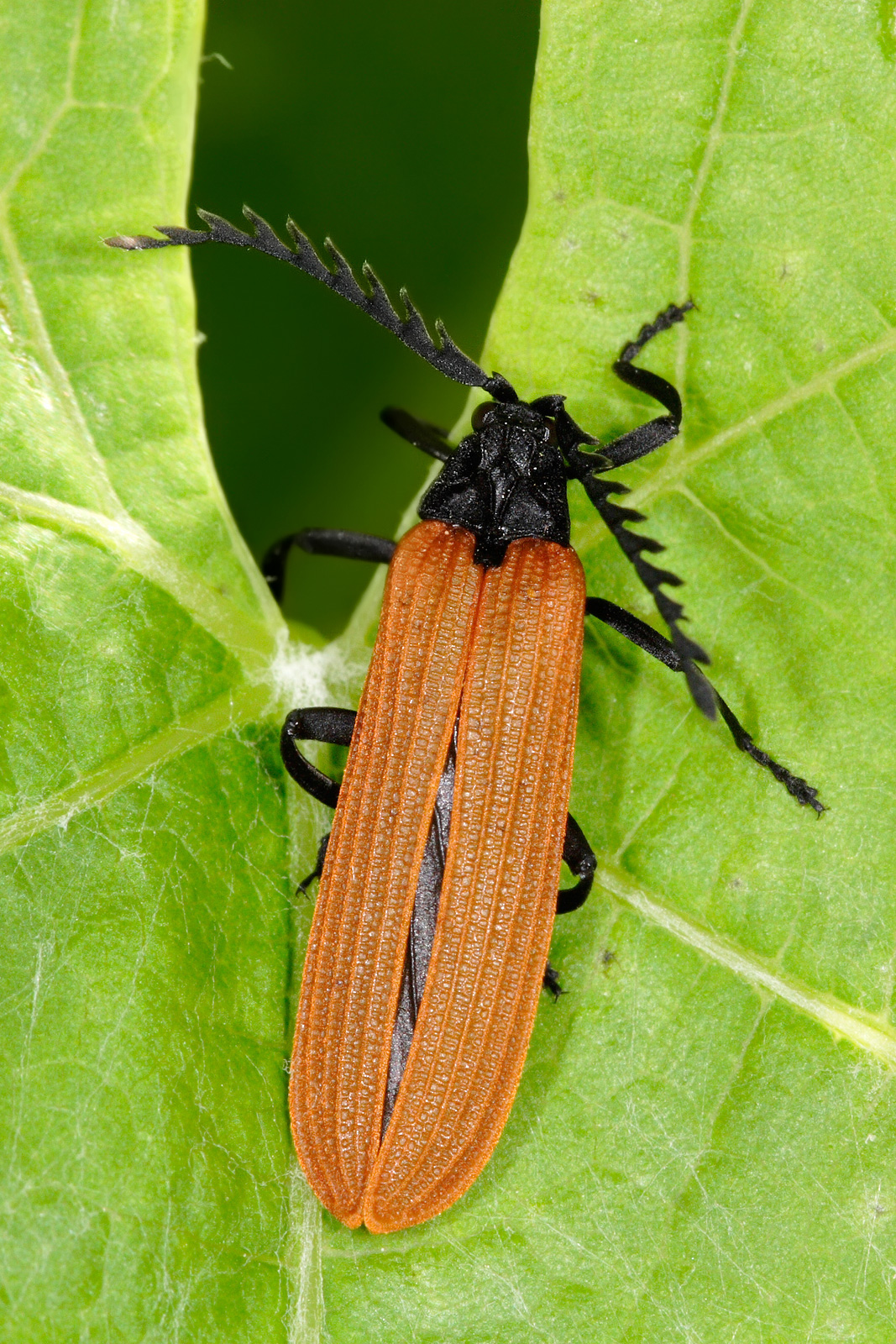

Scientific classification
- Kingdom: Animalia
- Phylum: Arthropoda
- Clade: Pancrustacea
- Class: Insecta
- Order: Coleoptera
- Suborder: Polyphaga
- Infraorder: Elateriformia
- Family: Lycidae
- Genus: Porrostoma
- Species: P. rhipidius

Binomial name
- Porrostoma rhipidius (W.S. Macleay, 1826)

Synonyms
- Metriorrhynchus rhipidius Porrostoma rhipidium

= Porrostoma rhipidius =

Species of beetle

Porrostoma rhipidius is a species of net-winged beetle in the family Lycidae, found widely in Australia. The name is sometimes misspelled as "rhipidium" but under ICZN Article 31 species names that are nouns, such as rhipidius, must retain their original spelling regardless of generic placement.
