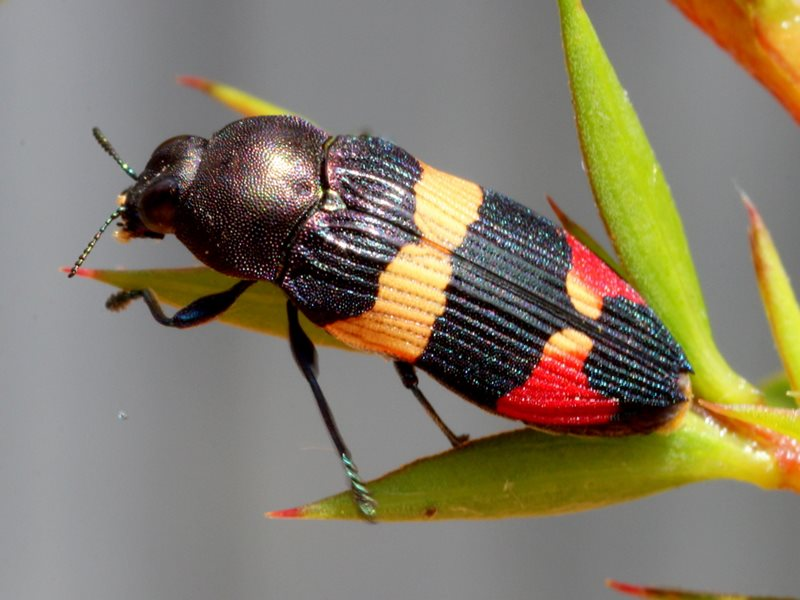

Scientific classification
- Domain: Eukaryota
- Kingdom: Animalia
- Phylum: Arthropoda
- Class: Insecta
- Order: Coleoptera
- Suborder: Polyphaga
- Infraorder: Elateriformia
- Family: Buprestidae
- Genus: Castiarina
- Species: C. bella

Binomial name
- Castiarina bella (Saunders, 1871)

= Castiarina bella =

Species of beetle

Castiarina bella is a species of beetle in the Buprestidae family, which is endemic to Australia and found along the east coast of Australia between Melbourne and Brisbane. It is a fairly common species in this area. As with other Castiarina species it is typically found on flowering shrubs and trees.

== Gallery ==
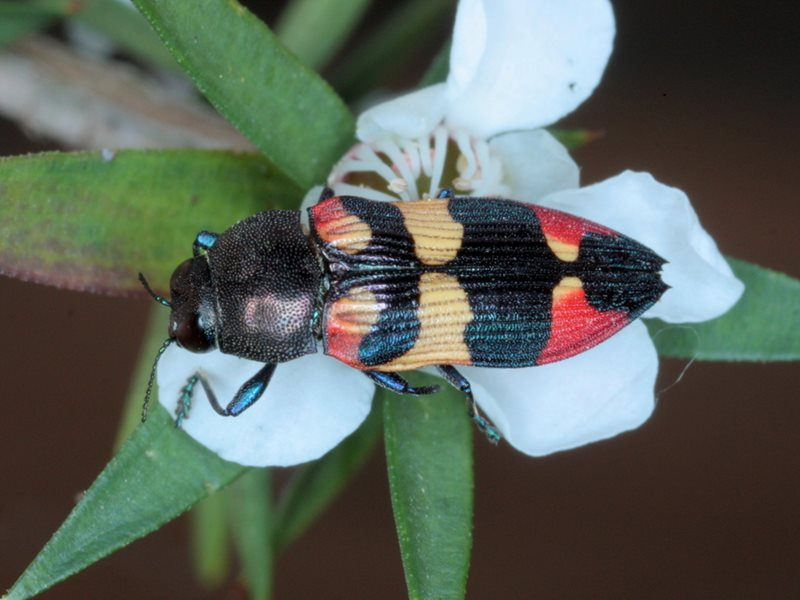
Castiarina bella variation
