= Castiarina setifera =

Scientific classification
- Domain: Eukaryota
- Kingdom: Animalia
- Phylum: Arthropoda
- Class: Insecta
- Order: Coleoptera
- Suborder: Polyphaga
- Infraorder: Elateriformia
- Family: Buprestidae
- Genus: Castiarina
- Species: C. setifera

Binomial name
- Castiarina setifera Barker, 2005

Species of beetle

Castiarina setifera is a species of Australian beetle in the jewel beetle family, Buprestidae, described in 2005.
