= Castiarina keyzeri =

Scientific classification
- Domain: Eukaryota
- Kingdom: Animalia
- Phylum: Arthropoda
- Class: Insecta
- Order: Coleoptera
- Suborder: Polyphaga
- Infraorder: Elateriformia
- Family: Buprestidae
- Genus: Castiarina
- Species: C. keyzeri

Binomial name
- Castiarina keyzeri Barker, 2005

Species of beetle

Castiarina keyzeri is a species of Australian beetle in the jewel beetle family, Buprestidae, described in 2005.
