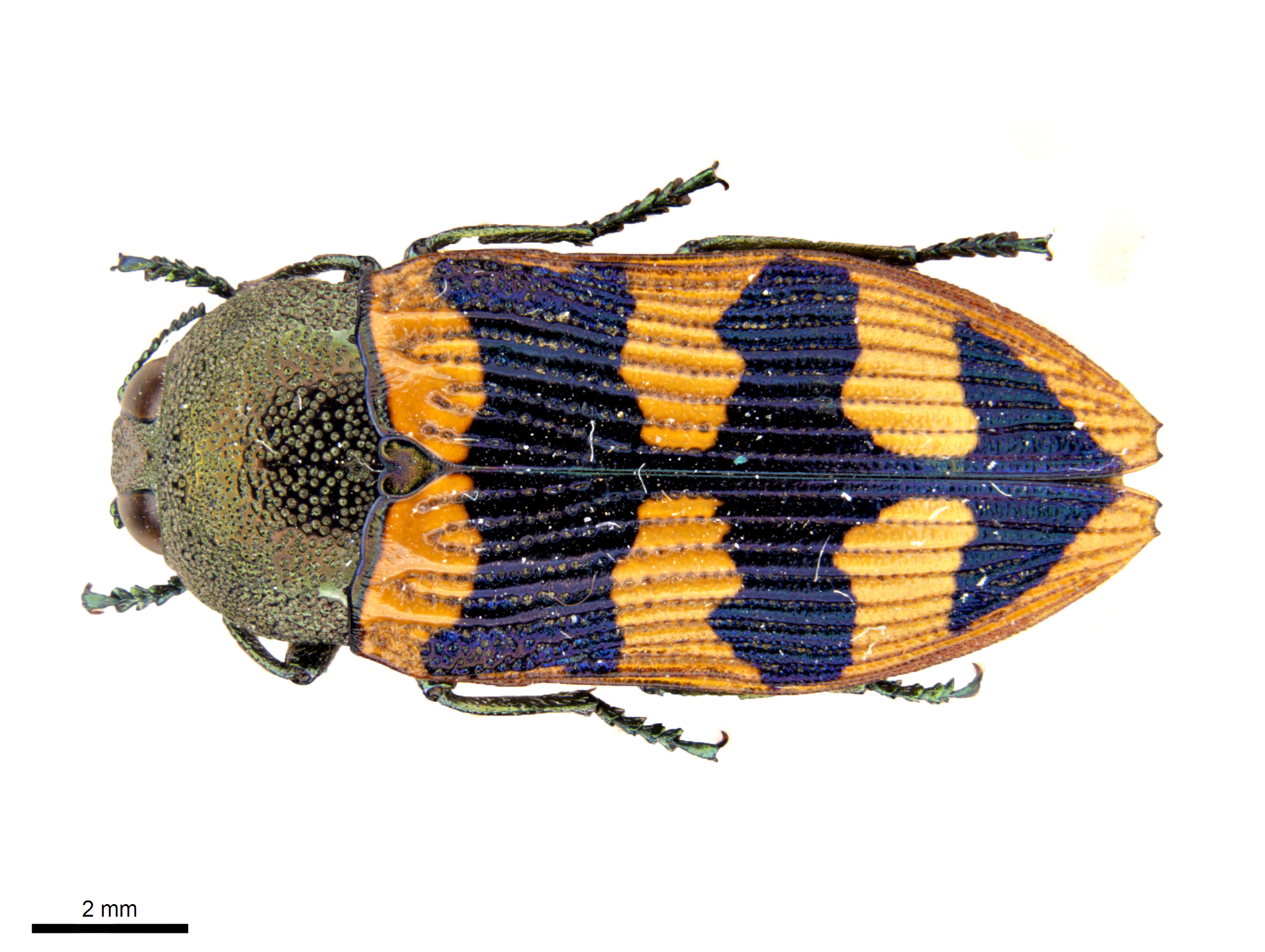

Scientific classification
- Domain: Eukaryota
- Kingdom: Animalia
- Phylum: Arthropoda
- Class: Insecta
- Order: Coleoptera
- Suborder: Polyphaga
- Infraorder: Elateriformia
- Family: Buprestidae
- Genus: Castiarina
- Species: C. alecgemmelli

Binomial name
- Castiarina alecgemmelli Barker, 1987

= Castiarina alecgemmelli =

Species of beetle

Castiarina alecgemmelli is a species of beetle of the genius Castiarina and family Buprestidae. It was first scientifically documented by Barker in 1987.
