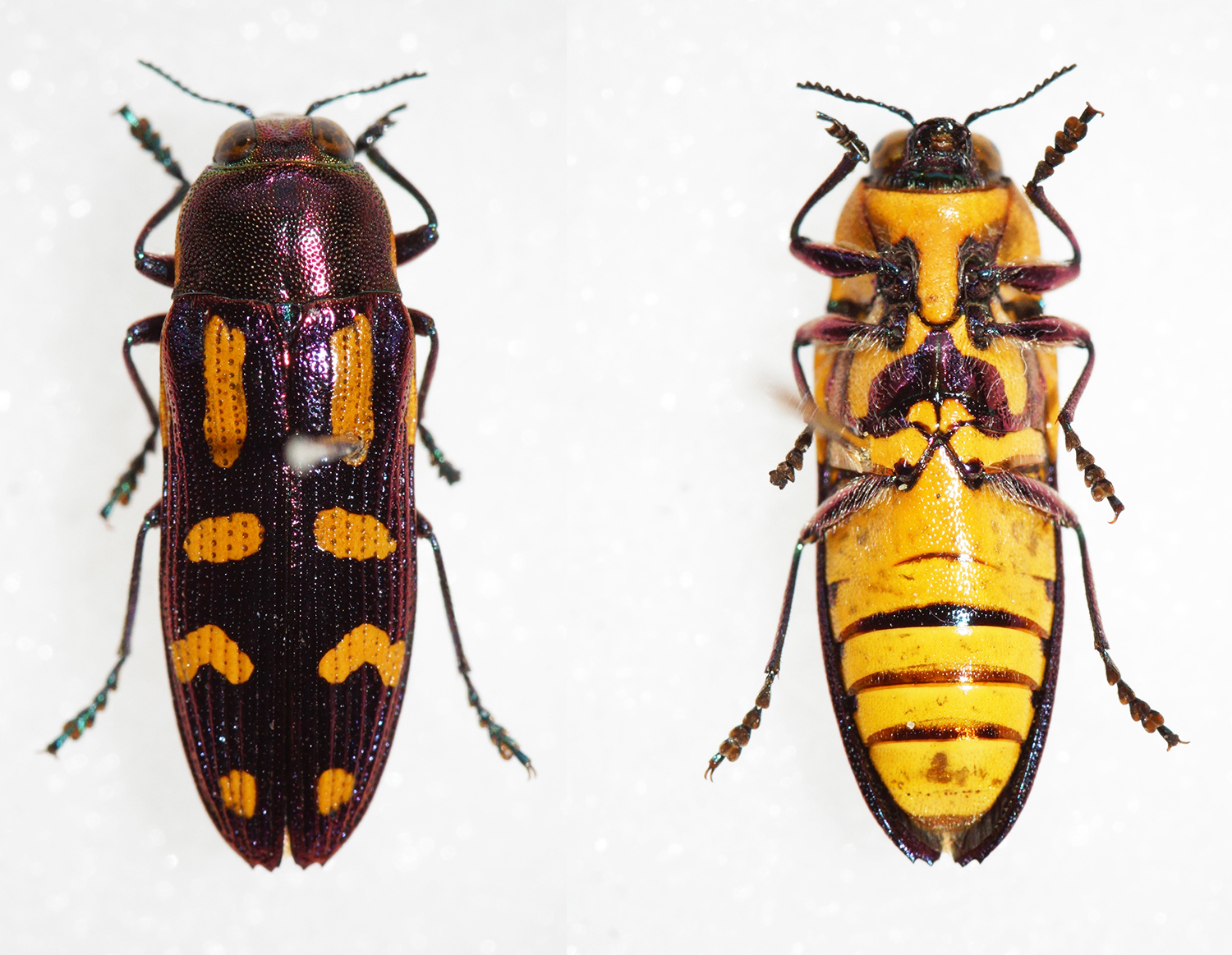

Scientific classification
- Domain: Eukaryota
- Kingdom: Animalia
- Phylum: Arthropoda
- Class: Insecta
- Order: Coleoptera
- Suborder: Polyphaga
- Infraorder: Elateriformia
- Family: Buprestidae
- Genus: Castiarina
- Species: C. picta

Binomial name
- Castiarina picta (Gory & Laporte, 1838)

= Castiarina picta =

Species of beetle

Castiarina picta is a species of beetle of the genus Castiarina, and the family Buprestidae. It was first scientifically documented by Gory and Laporte in 1838.
