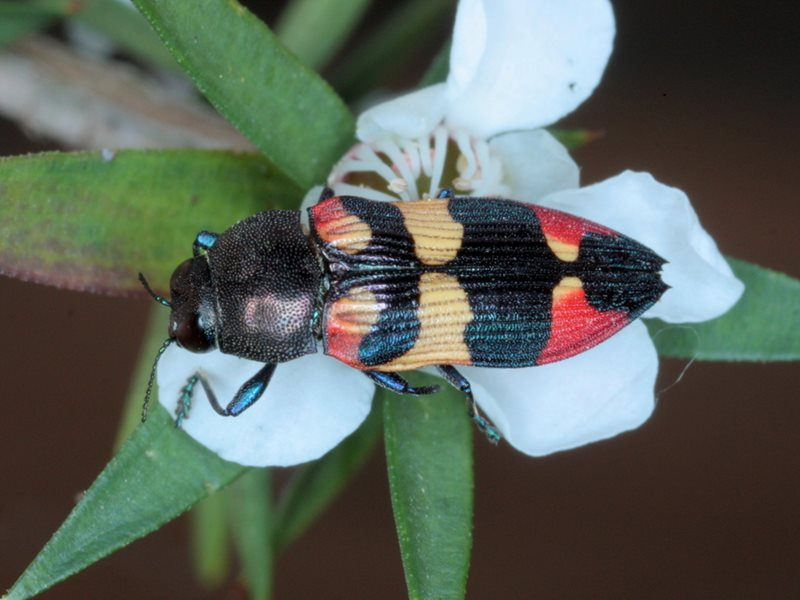
- Castiarina bella

Scientific classification
- Domain: Eukaryota
- Kingdom: Animalia
- Phylum: Arthropoda
- Class: Insecta
- Order: Coleoptera
- Suborder: Polyphaga
- Infraorder: Elateriformia
- Family: Buprestidae
- Tribe: Stigmoderini
- Genus: Castiarina; Gory & Laporte, 1838

= Castiarina =

Genus of beetles

Castiarina is a genus of beetles in the family Buprestidae, tribe Stigmoderini. This is one of the largest genera of beetles in Australia and emerge in the summertime to coordinate with flowering of native plants including Eucalyptus and tea trees (Leptospermum).

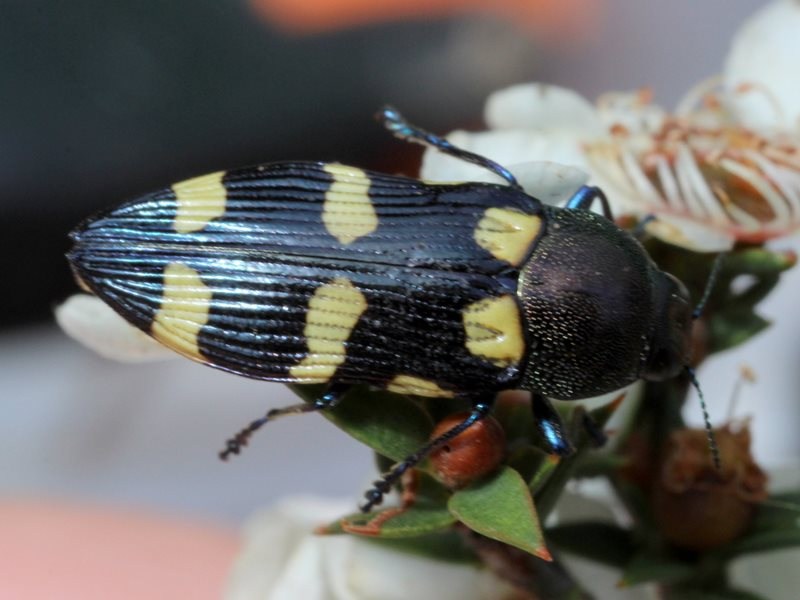
Castiarina australasiae

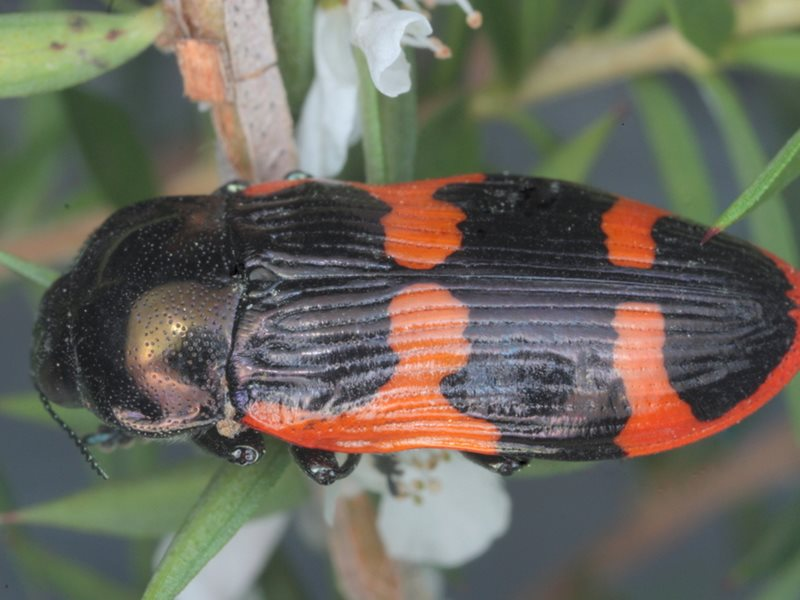
Castiarina bremei; Narbethong, Vic

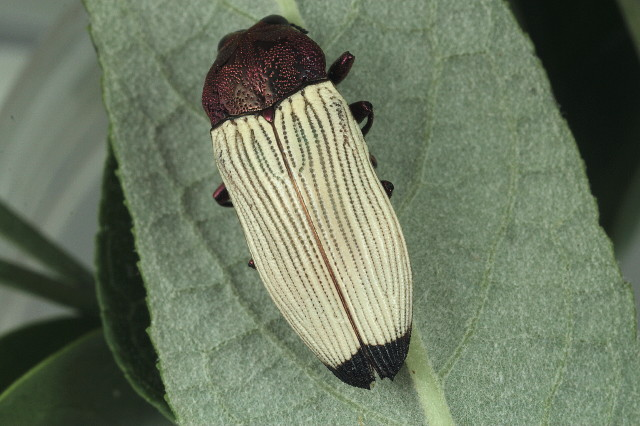
Castiarina bimaculata; Mt Surprise, FNQ

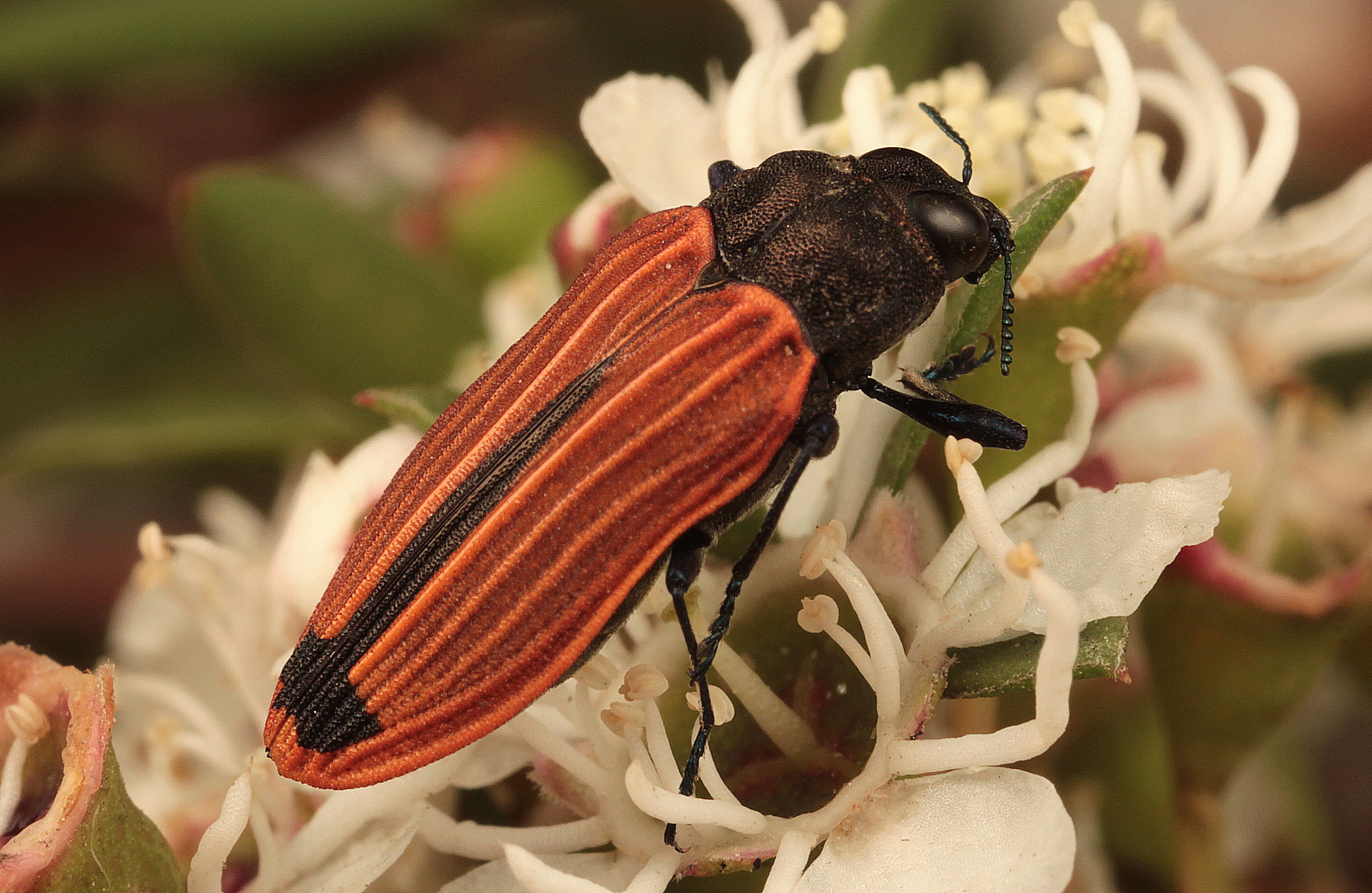
Castiarina erythroptera

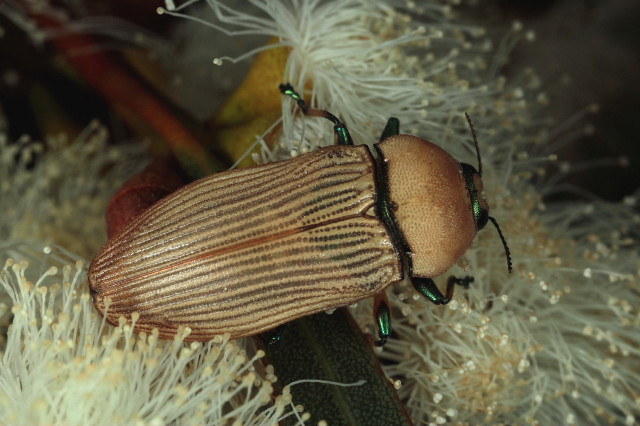
Castiarina flava; Big Desert

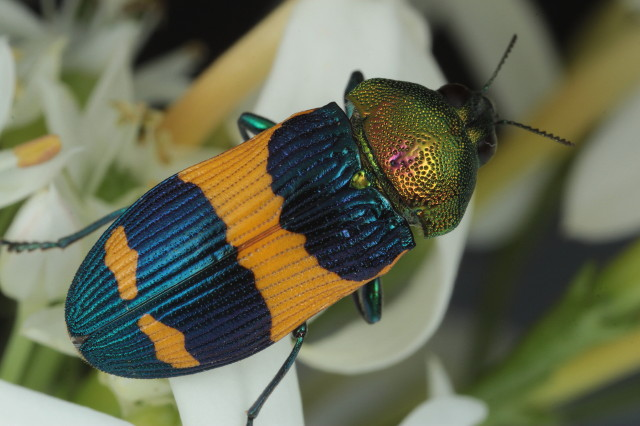
Castiarina garnettensis; Mt Surprise' FNQ

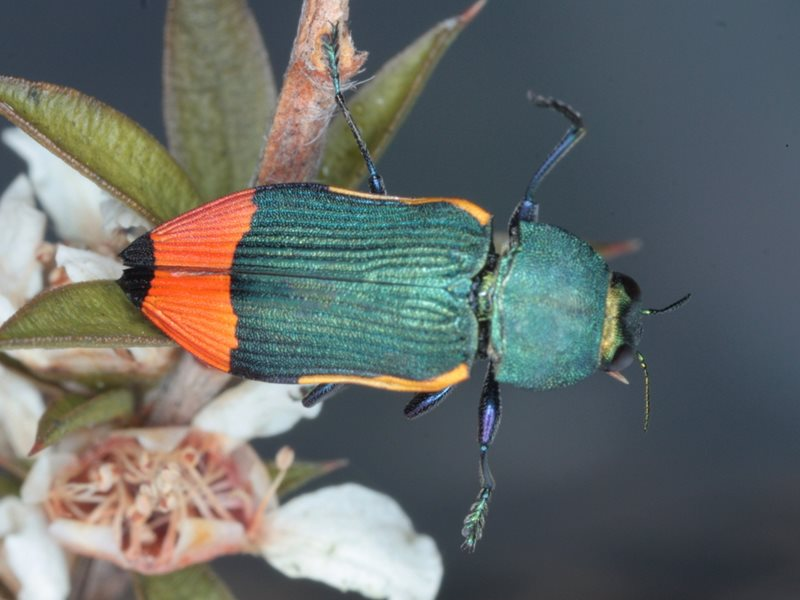
Castiarina kerremansi

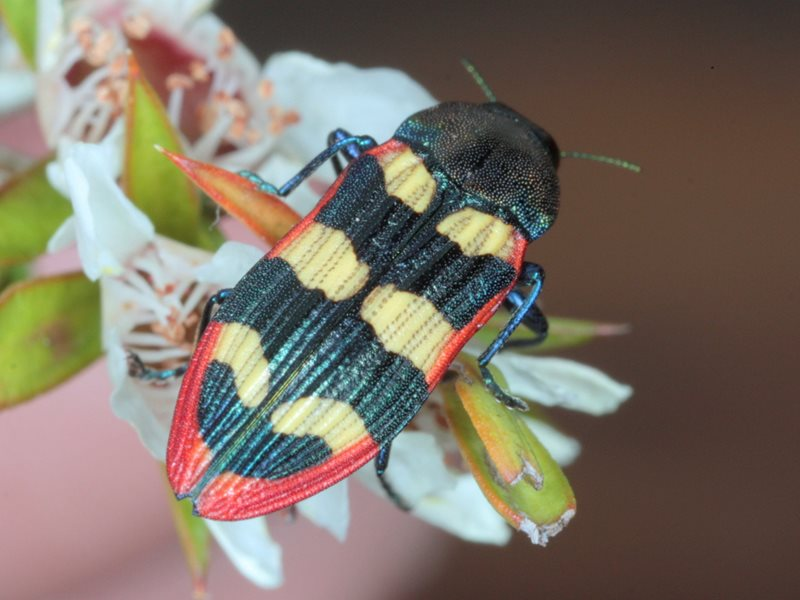
Castiarina punctatosulcata

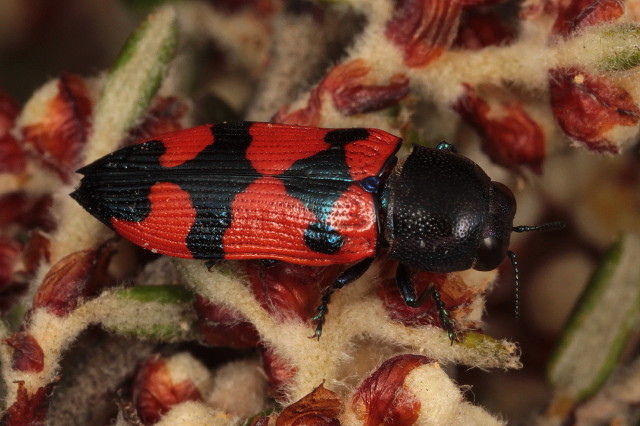
Castiarina recta; Big Desert, Vic

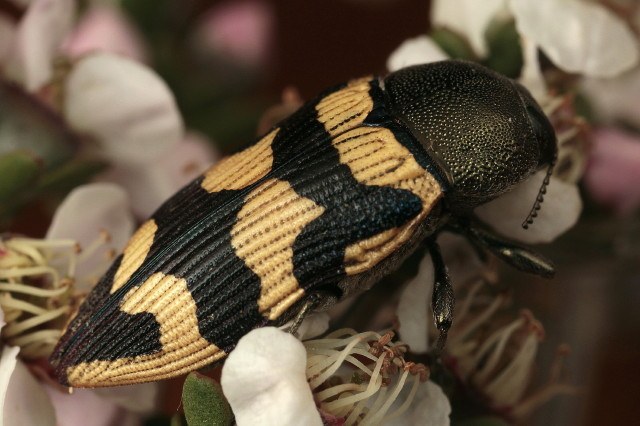
Castiarina simulata

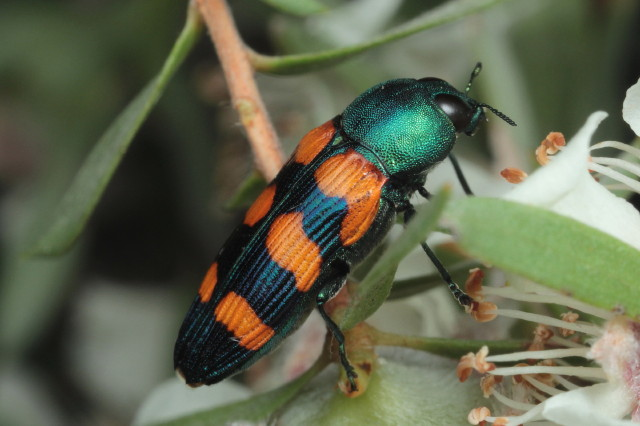
Castiarina vegeta

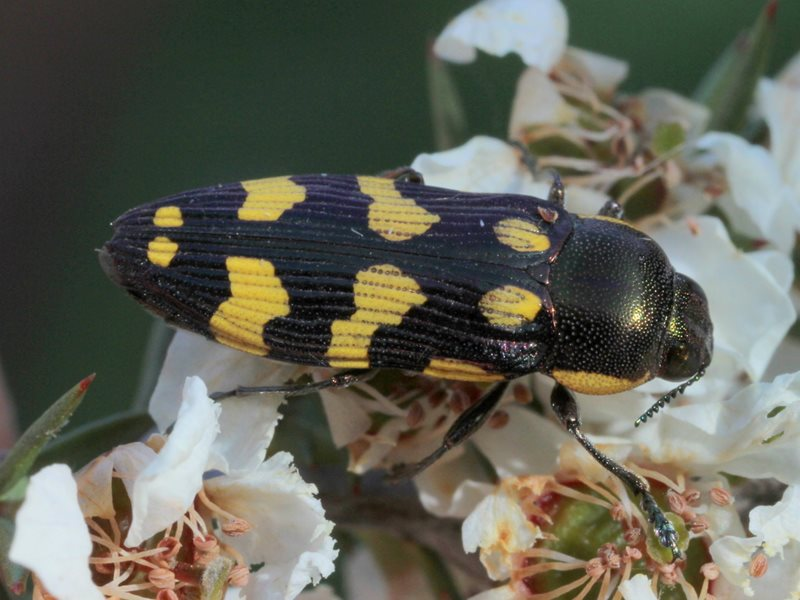
Castiarina victoriensis; Neerim Sth

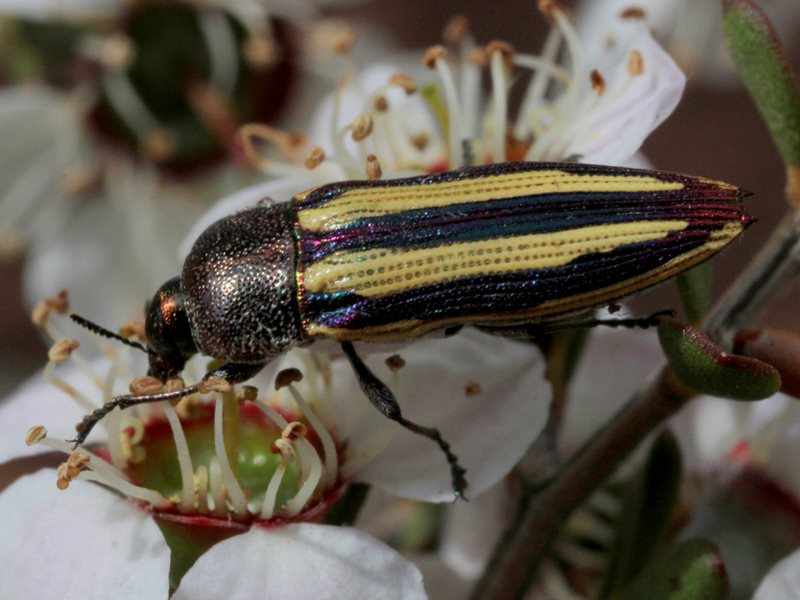
Castiarina vittata; Little Desert, Vic

== Species ==
There are over 400 species of Castiarina in Australia. Castiarina includes the following species:

- Castiarina abdita Barker, 1990
- Castiarina abdominalis (Saunders, 1868)
- Castiarina acuminata (Kerremans, 1898)
- Castiarina acuticeps (Saunders, 1869)
- Castiarina acuticollis (Carter, 1916)
- Castiarina adamsi (Deuquet, 1957)
- Castiarina adelaidae (Hope, 1846)
- Castiarina adusta Barker, 1996
- Castiarina aeneicornis (Saunders, 1868)
- Castiarina aeraticollis (Carter, 1930)
- Castiarina aeruginosa Barker, 1993
- Castiarina affabilis (Kerremans, 1898)
- Castiarina aglaia (Barker, 1987)
- Castiarina alecgemmelli (Barker, 1987)
- Castiarina alexandri (Carter, 1916)
- Castiarina allensundholmi Barker, 2005
- Castiarina alternecosta (Thomson, 1879)
- Castiarina alternozona (Thomson, 1878)
- Castiarina amabilis (Gory & Laporte, 1838)
- Castiarina amplipennis (Saunders, 1868)
- Castiarina analis (Saunders, 1869)
- Castiarina anchoralis (Gory & Laporte, 1838)
- Castiarina andersoni (Gory & Laporte, 1838)
- Castiarina antarctica Barker, 1996
- Castiarina anthrene Barker, 1993
- Castiarina antia Barker, 1993
- Castiarina aquila (Barker, 1980)
- Castiarina argillacea (Carter, 1916)
- Castiarina arida (Barker, 1987)
- Castiarina ariel (Carter, 1930)
- Castiarina armata (Thomson, 1879)
- Castiarina armstrongi (Barker, 1983)
- Castiarina asekiensis Nylander, 2007
- Castiarina ashburtonensis (Barker, 1988)
- Castiarina athertonensis (Barker, 1986)
- Castiarina atra (Barker, 1987)
- Castiarina atricollis (Saunders, 1869)
- Castiarina atrocoerulea (Kerremans, 1890)
- Castiarina atronotata (Waterhouse, 1874)
- Castiarina attenuata (Carter, 1916)
- Castiarina audax (Saunders, 1869)
- Castiarina aura Barker, 1996
- Castiarina aurantia Barker, 1990
- Castiarina aurantiaca (Carter, 1931)
- Castiarina aurea (Barker, 1980)
- Castiarina aureola (Carter, 1913)
- Castiarina australasiae (Gory & Laporte, 1838)
- Castiarina azurea Barker, 1996
- Castiarina bakeri (Barker, 1979)
- Castiarina balteata (Saunders, 1869)
- Castiarina balthasari (Obenberger, 1928)
- Castiarina bazilisca (Obenberger, 1933)
- Castiarina beatrix Barker, 1990
- Castiarina bella (Saunders, 1871)
- Castiarina bicolor (Gory & Laporte, 1838)
- Castiarina bifasciata (Hope, 1831)
- Castiarina biguttata (Macleay, 1863)
- Castiarina bilyi Barker, 2004
- Castiarina bimaculata (Saunders, 1868)
- Castiarina binotata (Saunders, 1871)
- Castiarina blackdownensis (Barker, 1986)
- Castiarina boldensis (Barker, 1983)
- Castiarina booanyia (Carter, 1933)
- Castiarina borealis (Barker, 1979)
- Castiarina bremei (Hope, 1843)
- Castiarina brooksi (Barker, 1979)
- Castiarina broomensis (Carter, 1934)
- Castiarina browni (Carter, 1916)
- Castiarina browningi (Barker, 1986)
- Castiarina brutella (Thomson, 1879)
- Castiarina bucolica (Kerremans, 1898)
- Castiarina bugejiana Barker, 2004
- Castiarina burchellii (Gory & Laporte, 1838)
- Castiarina burnsi (Barker, 1986)
- Castiarina caillaina (Barker, 1987)
- Castiarina callubriensis (Carter, 1931)
- Castiarina campestris (Blackburn, 1897)
- Castiarina capensis (Barker, 1986)
- Castiarina carinata (Macleay, 1863)
- Castiarina carminea (Saunders, 1868)
- Castiarina carnabyi (Barker, 1979)
- Castiarina castelnaudi (Saunders, 1869)
- Castiarina chamelauci (Barker, 1987)
- Castiarina charientessa Barker, 1996
- Castiarina chinnocki (Barker, 1983)
- Castiarina chlorota Barker, 2004
- Castiarina chrysothoracica Barker, 1993
- Castiarina cincta (Blackburn, 1890)
- Castiarina cinnamomea (Macleay, 1863)
- Castiarina clancula (Obenberger, 1922)
- Castiarina coalstounensis Barker, 2004
- Castiarina coccinata (Hope, 1843)
- Castiarina coeruleipes (Saunders, 1869)
- Castiarina colligens (Kerremans, 1890)
- Castiarina colorata (Hope, 1847)
- Castiarina commixta (Carter, 1924)
- Castiarina confusa (Waterhouse, 1874)
- Castiarina convexa (Carter, 1913)
- Castiarina coolsi (Barker, 1986)
- Castiarina corallina Barker, 1995
- Castiarina cornishi (Barker, 1983)
- Castiarina costalis (Saunders, 1869)
- Castiarina costata (Saunders, 1868)
- Castiarina costipennis (Saunders, 1869)
- Castiarina cracenta (Barker, 1986)
- Castiarina crenata (Donovan, 1805)
- Castiarina creta Barker, 1990
- Castiarina crocicolor (Gory & Laporte, 1838)
- Castiarina crockerae (Barker, 1979)
- Castiarina crucianella Barker, 1993
- Castiarina cruenta (Gory & Laporte, 1838)
- Castiarina cruentata (Kirby, 1818)
- Castiarina crux (Saunders, 1868)
- Castiarina cupida (Kerremans, 1898)
- Castiarina cupreoflava (Saunders, 1869)
- Castiarina cupricauda (Saunders, 1868)
- Castiarina cupricollis (Saunders, 1868)
- Castiarina cyanipes (Saunders, 1868)
- Castiarina cydista (Rainbow, 1904)
- Castiarina cylindracea (Saunders, 1868)
- Castiarina daedalea Barker, 1990
- Castiarina danesi (Obenberger, 1933)
- Castiarina daranj Barker, 1996
- Castiarina darkinensis Barker, 2004
- Castiarina decemguttata (Gory, 1841)
- Castiarina decemmaculata (Kirby, 1818)
- Castiarina decipiens (Westwood, 1837)
- Castiarina delectabilis (Hope, 1847)
- Castiarina delicatula (Kerremans, 1903)
- Castiarina delta (Thomson, 1879)
- Castiarina demarzi Barker, 1996
- Castiarina denmanensis Barker, 2004
- Castiarina desideria (Carter, 1916)
- Castiarina dessarti (Barker, 1986)
- Castiarina deuqueti (Carter, 1927)
- Castiarina deyrollei (Thomson, 1879)
- Castiarina dilatata (Carter, 1927)
- Castiarina dimidiata (Carter, 1908)
- Castiarina dingoensis (Barker, 1983)
- Castiarina discoflava (Carter, 1930)
- Castiarina discoidea (Carter, 1931)
- Castiarina discolorata (Barker, 1986)
- Castiarina dispar (Blackburn, 1892)
- Castiarina distantia (Barker, 1988)
- Castiarina distincta (Saunders, 1868)
- Castiarina distinguenda (Saunders, 1869)
- Castiarina diversa (Kerremans, 1900)
- Castiarina doddi (Carter, 1913)
- Castiarina domina (Carter, 1931)
- Castiarina dryadula (Carter, 1930)
- Castiarina duaringae (Carter, 1929)
- Castiarina dugganensis (Barker, 1987)
- Castiarina earina (Barker, 1987)
- Castiarina eborica (Carter, 1934)
- Castiarina elderi (Blackburn, 1892)
- Castiarina elongata (Saunders, 1868)
- Castiarina eneabba (Barker, 1983)
- Castiarina enigma Barker, 1996
- Castiarina erasma (Carter, 1935)
- Castiarina eremita (Blackburn, 1890)
- Castiarina ernestadamsi Barker, 1995
- Castiarina erubescens (Blackburn, 1901)
- Castiarina erythromelas (Boisduval, 1835)
- Castiarina erythroptera (Boisduval, 1835)
- Castiarina euclae (Barker, 1983)
- Castiarina euknema Barker, 1995
- Castiarina eyrensis (Barker, 1986)
- Castiarina femorata (Gory & Laporte, 1838)
- Castiarina ferruginea Barker, 1996
- Castiarina festiva (Carter, 1916)
- Castiarina filiformis (Blackburn, 1892)
- Castiarina flava (Saunders, 1869)
- Castiarina flaviceps (Carter, 1913)
- Castiarina flavopicta (Boisduval, 1835)
- Castiarina flavopurpurea (Carter, 1908)
- Castiarina flavosignata (Macleay, 1863)
- Castiarina flavoviridis (Carter, 1927)
- Castiarina flindersi (Carter, 1922)
- Castiarina forresti (Barker, 1983)
- Castiarina fossoria (Carter, 1927)
- Castiarina frauciana (Barker, 1983)
- Castiarina fulviventris (Macleay, 1863)
- Castiarina furtiva (Barker, 1983)
- Castiarina galactica Barker, 1990
- Castiarina gardnerae (Barker, 1987)
- Castiarina garnettensis (Barker, 1989)
- Castiarina garrawillae (Carter, 1931)
- Castiarina gentilis (Kerremans, 1900)
- Castiarina gibbicollis (Saunders, 1868)
- Castiarina gilberti Barker, 2004
- Castiarina goerlingi (Carter, 1937)
- Castiarina goodingi (Barker, 1983)
- Castiarina gordonburnsi (Barker, 1987)
- Castiarina goudiana (Barker, 1987)
- Castiarina gracilior (Carter, 1915)
- Castiarina grata (Saunders, 1869)
- Castiarina gravis (Harold, 1869)
- Castiarina guttata (Blackburn, 1890)
- Castiarina guttaticollis (Blackburn, 1890)
- Castiarina guttifera (Obenberger, 1922)
- Castiarina hanloni (Barker, 1983)
- Castiarina harrisoni (Carter, 1925)
- Castiarina harslettae (Deuquet, 1957)
- Castiarina hasenpuschi Barker, 1993
- Castiarina haswelli (Carter, 1916)
- Castiarina hateleyi (Barker, 1980)
- Castiarina hawkeswoodi (Peterson, 1987)
- Castiarina helmsi (Carter, 1906)
- Castiarina hemizostera Barker, 1996
- Castiarina hilaris (Hope, 1846)
- Castiarina hilleri (Barker, 1986)
- Castiarina hirundicauda (Carter, 1916)
- Castiarina hoblerae (Carter, 1922)
- Castiarina hoffmanseggii (Hope, 1846)
- Castiarina holynskii Nylander, 2006
- Castiarina hostilis (Blackburn, 1892)
- Castiarina hudsoni (Nylander, 2001)
- Castiarina humeralis (Kerremans, 1903)
- Castiarina humilis (Deuquet, 1947)
- Castiarina hypocrita (Barker, 1983)
- Castiarina ignea (Blackburn, 1892)
- Castiarina ignota (Saunders, 1869)
- Castiarina imitator (Carter, 1930)
- Castiarina immaculata (Carter, 1915)
- Castiarina impressicollis (Macleay, 1863)
- Castiarina incognita (Barker, 1986)
- Castiarina inconspicua (Saunders, 1868)
- Castiarina indigesta Barker, 1993
- Castiarina indigohumerosa Barker, 1990
- Castiarina indigoventricosa Barker, 1990
- Castiarina indistincta (Saunders, 1869)
- Castiarina inermis (Kerremans, 1890)
- Castiarina inflata (Barker, 1980)
- Castiarina insculpta (Carter, 1934)
- Castiarina insignicollis (Blackburn, 1900)
- Castiarina insignis (Blackburn, 1892)
- Castiarina insularis (Blackburn, 1897)
- Castiarina intacta (Carter, 1930)
- Castiarina interstincta Barker, 1990
- Castiarina interstitialis (Carter, 1931)
- Castiarina jackhasenpuschi Barker, 1996
- Castiarina jacki Barker, 2005
- Castiarina jeanae (Barker, 1983)
- Castiarina jekellii (Saunders, 1868)
- Castiarina jimturneri (Barker, 1987)
- Castiarina jospilota (Gory & Laporte, 1838)
- Castiarina jubata (Blackburn, 1890)
- Castiarina jucunda (Saunders, 1868)
- Castiarina julia (Thomson, 1879)
- Castiarina kanangara (Barker, 1987)
- Castiarina kempsteri (Barker, 1986)
- Castiarina kerremansi (Blackburn, 1890)
- Castiarina kershawi (Carter, 1924)
- Castiarina keyzeri Barker, 2005
- Castiarina kiatae (Barker, 1980)
- Castiarina kirbyi (Guérin-Méneville, 1830)
- Castiarina kitchini Barker, 2004
- Castiarina klugii (Gory & Laporte, 1838)
- Castiarina laena (Thomson, 1879)
- Castiarina laevinotata (Carter, 1934)
- Castiarina latipes (Carter, 1924)
- Castiarina lauta (Barker, 1987)
- Castiarina leai (Carter, 1916)
- Castiarina lepida (Carter, 1916)
- Castiarina liliputana (Thomson, 1857)
- Castiarina lisaejessicae Hawkeswood & Turner, 2009
- Castiarina livida (Barker, 1987)
- Castiarina longicollis (Saunders, 1869)
- Castiarina loriae (Kerremans, 1895)
- Castiarina lukini (Barker, 1986)
- Castiarina luteipennis (Gory, 1841)
- Castiarina luteocincta (Saunders, 1868)
- Castiarina luteofusca Barker, 1993
- Castiarina lycida Barker, 2005
- Castiarina macarthuri Barker, 2005
- Castiarina macmillani (Barker, 1979)
- Castiarina macquillani (Barker, 1988)
- Castiarina maculicollis (Carter, 1916)
- Castiarina maculifer (Kerremans, 1903)
- Castiarina maculipennis (Saunders, 1868)
- Castiarina magnificollis (Barker, 1979)
- Castiarina malleeana (Carter, 1931)
- Castiarina mansueta (Kerremans, 1898)
- Castiarina marginata (Barker, 1983)
- Castiarina marginicollis (Saunders, 1868)
- Castiarina markgoldingi Barker, 2004
- Castiarina markhanloni Barker, 1990
- Castiarina mayoiana (Barker, 1988)
- Castiarina media (Hope, 1847)
- Castiarina meeki (Théry, 1937)
- Castiarina melasma Barker, 1993
- Castiarina melrosensis (Barker, 1986)
- Castiarina metallica (Barker, 1979)
- Castiarina michaelpowelli Barker, 2005
- Castiarina militaris (Carter, 1922)
- Castiarina mima (Saunders, 1868)
- Castiarina mimesis Barker, 1993
- Castiarina mimica (Barker, 1980)
- Castiarina minuta (Blackburn, 1892)
- Castiarina montigena (Oke, 1928)
- Castiarina moribunda (Saunders, 1869)
- Castiarina moxoni Barker, 2004
- Castiarina murchisonensis (Barker, 1988)
- Castiarina mustelamajor (Thomson, 1857)
- Castiarina nanula (Kerremans, 1890)
- Castiarina nasuta (Saunders, 1869)
- Castiarina nebula Barker, 1993
- Castiarina neglecta (Carter, 1916)
- Castiarina nigriceps (Barker, 1979)
- Castiarina nigriventris (Macleay, 1863)
- Castiarina nonyma Barker, 1996
- Castiarina nota Barker, 1990
- Castiarina nullarborica Barker, 1996
- Castiarina nylanderi Holynski, 2009
- Castiarina obliqua (Kerremans, 1903)
- Castiarina oblita (Carter, 1931)
- Castiarina obscura (Saunders, 1869)
- Castiarina obsepta (Kerremans, 1890)
- Castiarina occidentalis (Barker, 1979)
- Castiarina ocelligera (Gory, 1841)
- Castiarina ochreiventris (Saunders, 1869)
- Castiarina octomaculata (Saunders, 1868)
- Castiarina octopunctata Barker, 1995
- Castiarina octosignata (Carter, 1919)
- Castiarina octospilota (Gory & Laporte, 1838)
- Castiarina oedemerida Barker, 1995
- Castiarina ornata (Blackburn, 1892)
- Castiarina ovata (Barker, 1979)
- Castiarina pallas (Blackburn, 1901)
- Castiarina palliata Barker, 1990
- Castiarina pallida Barker, 2004
- Castiarina pallidipennis (Blackburn, 1890)
- Castiarina pallidiventris (Gory & Laporte, 1838)
- Castiarina parallela (White, 1859)
- Castiarina parallelipennis (Obenberger, 1934)
- Castiarina parvula (Deuquet, 1956)
- Castiarina paulhasenpuschi Barker, 1996
- Castiarina pearsoni (Barker, 1986)
- Castiarina perlonga (Carter, 1931)
- Castiarina pertyi (Gory & Laporte, 1838)
- Castiarina phaeopus Barker, 1996
- Castiarina phaeorrhaea (Kirby, 1818)
- Castiarina picta (Gory & Laporte, 1838)
- Castiarina pictipennis (Saunders, 1868)
- Castiarina piliventris (Saunders, 1868)
- Castiarina placens (Kerremans, 1898)
- Castiarina placida (Thomson, 1879)
- Castiarina planata (Carter, 1916)
- Castiarina planipes (Barker, 1979)
- Castiarina powelli (Barker, 1983)
- Castiarina praetermissa (Carter, 1921)
- Castiarina producta (Saunders, 1868)
- Castiarina prolata Barker, 1995
- Castiarina propinqua (Carter, 1916)
- Castiarina pseudasilida (Barker, 1983)
- Castiarina pseuderythroptera (Barker, 1983)
- Castiarina puella (Saunders, 1869)
- Castiarina puerilis (Kerremans, 1898)
- Castiarina pulchra (Saunders, 1869)
- Castiarina pulchripes (Blackburn, 1897)
- Castiarina pulla (Barker, 1986)
- Castiarina punctatissima (Saunders, 1869)
- Castiarina punctatosulcata (Saunders, 1869)
- Castiarina punctiventris (Saunders, 1869)
- Castiarina purcellae Barker, 2005
- Castiarina puteolata (Carter, 1939)
- Castiarina quadrifasciata (Saunders, 1868)
- Castiarina quadriguttata (Macleay, 1863)
- Castiarina quadriplagiata (Carter, 1930)
- Castiarina quinquepunctata (Waterhouse, 1874)
- Castiarina radians (Carter, 1933)
- Castiarina rayclarkei Barker, 1993
- Castiarina recta (Saunders, 1869)
- Castiarina rectifasciata (Saunders, 1868)
- Castiarina rediviva Barker, 1990
- Castiarina richardsi (Barker, 1979)
- Castiarina robusta (Saunders, 1869)
- Castiarina rollei (Kerremans, 1908)
- Castiarina rostralis (Carter, 1917)
- Castiarina rostrata (Thomson, 1879)
- Castiarina rubicunda (Carter, 1931)
- Castiarina rubriventris (Blackburn, 1900)
- Castiarina rudis (Carter, 1934)
- Castiarina rufa (Barker, 1986)
- Castiarina rufipennis (Kirby, 1818)
- Castiarina rufipes (Macleay, 1863)
- Castiarina rufolimbata (Carter, 1916)
- Castiarina rutila (Deuquet, 1947)
- Castiarina sagittaria (Gory & Laporte, 1838)
- Castiarina sanguinolenta (Gory & Laporte, 1838)
- Castiarina scalaris (Boisduval, 1835)
- Castiarina scintillata (Barker, 1983)
- Castiarina sedlaceki (Barker, 1988)
- Castiarina semicincta (Gory & Laporte, 1838)
- Castiarina seminigra (Carter, 1913)
- Castiarina semisuturalis (Saunders, 1868)
- Castiarina septemguttata (Waterhouse, 1874)
- Castiarina septemspilota (Carter, 1913)
- Castiarina serratipennis (Carter, 1916)
- Castiarina setifera Barker, 2005
- Castiarina sexcavata (Deuquet, 1938)
- Castiarina sexguttata (Macleay, 1863)
- Castiarina sexnotata (Carter, 1916)
- Castiarina sexplagiata (Gory, 1841)
- Castiarina sexualis (Carter, 1929)
- Castiarina shelleybarkeri Nylander, 2006
- Castiarina sieboldi (Gory & Laporte, 1838)
- Castiarina signata (Kerremans, 1903)
- Castiarina simulata (Gory & Laporte, 1838)
- Castiarina skusei (Blackburn, 1892)
- Castiarina spectabilis (Kerremans, 1900)
- Castiarina spilota (Gory & Laporte, 1838)
- Castiarina spinolae (Gory, 1841)
- Castiarina stellata (Barker, 1986)
- Castiarina storeyi (Barker, 1983)
- Castiarina straminea (Macleay, 1863)
- Castiarina strigata (Macleay, 1863)
- Castiarina subacuticeps (Barker, 1979)
- Castiarina subbifasciata (Saunders, 1868)
- Castiarina subcincta Barker, 1996
- Castiarina subgrata (Blackburn, 1900)
- Castiarina subnotata (Carter, 1933)
- Castiarina subpura (Blackburn, 1903)
- Castiarina subtestacea (Barker, 1983)
- Castiarina subtincta (Carter, 1933)
- Castiarina subtrifasciata (Gory & Laporte, 1838)
- Castiarina subvicina (Barker, 1983)
- Castiarina suehasenpuschae Barker, 2005
- Castiarina sulfurea (Deuquet, 1938)
- Castiarina sundholmi (Barker, 1987)
- Castiarina supergrata (Barker, 1983)
- Castiarina suttoni (Carter, 1932)
- Castiarina tasmaniensis (Barker, 1986)
- Castiarina tenebrosa Barker, 1993
- Castiarina tepperi (Barker, 1988)
- Castiarina terminalis (Kerremans, 1890)
- Castiarina terraereginae (Blackburn, 1893)
- Castiarina testacea (Saunders, 1869)
- Castiarina thomsoni (Saunders, 1868)
- Castiarina thurmerae (Barker, 1983)
- Castiarina tigris (Barker, 1983)
- Castiarina tincticauda (Carter, 1916)
- Castiarina titania (Carter, 1916)
- Castiarina tricolor (Kirby, 1818)
- Castiarina trifasciata (Gory & Laporte, 1838)
- Castiarina trimaculata (Saunders, 1868)
- Castiarina triramosa (Thomson, 1879)
- Castiarina trispiculis (Carter, 1931)
- Castiarina tropica (Carter, 1922)
- Castiarina turbulenta (Barker, 1986)
- Castiarina turneri (Barker, 1983)
- Castiarina tyrrhena (Blackburn, 1903)
- Castiarina uncata (Barker, 1986)
- Castiarina undulata (Donovan, 1805)
- Castiarina uptoni (Barker, 1979)
- Castiarina ustulata Barker, 1996
- Castiarina vallisii (Deuquet, 1964)
- Castiarina vanderwoudeae (Barker, 1987)
- Castiarina variegata (Blackburn, 1892)
- Castiarina variopicta (Thomson, 1878)
- Castiarina vegeta (Hope, 1847)
- Castiarina venusta (Carter, 1914)
- Castiarina verdiceps (Barker, 1979)
- Castiarina versicolor (Gory & Laporte, 1838)
- Castiarina vicina (Saunders, 1868)
- Castiarina victoriensis (Blackburn, 1890)
- Castiarina violacea (Macleay, 1863)
- Castiarina virginea (Erichson, 1842)
- Castiarina viridissima (Barker, 1987)
- Castiarina viridiventris (Macleay, 1863)
- Castiarina viridolinea (Barker, 1986)
- Castiarina vittata (Saunders, 1868)
- Castiarina vulgaris (Carter, 1931)
- Castiarina walfordi (Barker, 1979)
- Castiarina warningensis (Barker, 1986)
- Castiarina watkinsi (Barker, 1988)
- Castiarina wellsae (Barker, 1989)
- Castiarina williamsi (Barker, 1988)
- Castiarina wilsoni (Saunders, 1868)
- Castiarina woodi Barker, 1993
- Castiarina xanthopilosa (Hope, 1847)
- Castiarina xystra Barker, 1993
- Castiarina yellowdinensis (Barker, 1983)
- Castiarina zecki (Deuquet, 1959)
