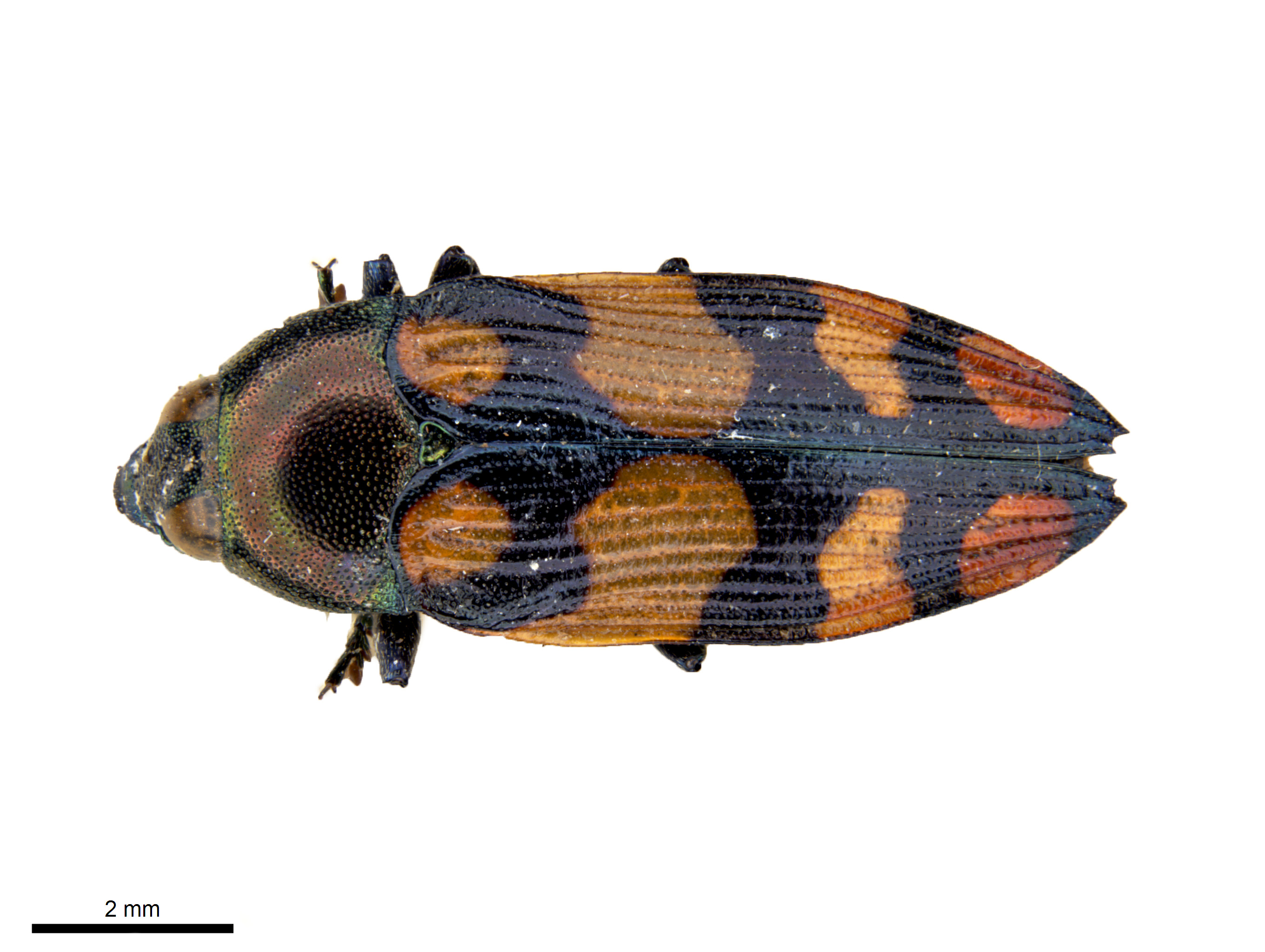

Scientific classification
- Domain: Eukaryota
- Kingdom: Animalia
- Phylum: Arthropoda
- Class: Insecta
- Order: Coleoptera
- Suborder: Polyphaga
- Infraorder: Elateriformia
- Family: Buprestidae
- Genus: Castiarina
- Species: C. alternecosta

Binomial name
- Castiarina alternecosta (Thomson, 1879)

= Castiarina alternecosta =

Species of beetle

Castiarina alternecosta is a species of beetle of the genus Castiarina and the family Buprestidae. It was first scientifically described by Thomson in 1879.
