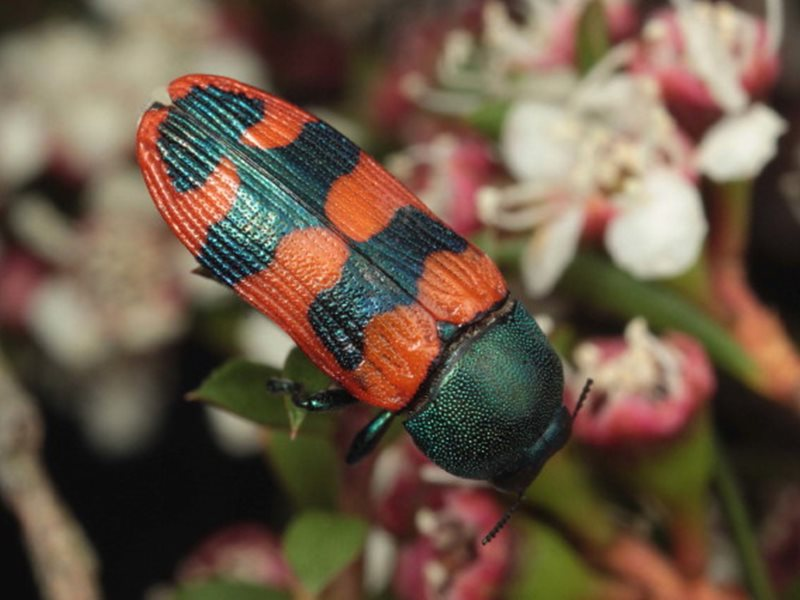

Scientific classification
- Domain: Eukaryota
- Kingdom: Animalia
- Phylum: Arthropoda
- Class: Insecta
- Order: Coleoptera
- Suborder: Polyphaga
- Infraorder: Elateriformia
- Family: Buprestidae
- Genus: Castiarina
- Species: C. crenata

Binomial name
- Castiarina crenata (Donovan, 1805)

= Castiarina crenata =

Species of beetle

Castiarina crenata is a species of beetle in the Buprestidae family, which is endemic to Australia and widespread in the southern half.
