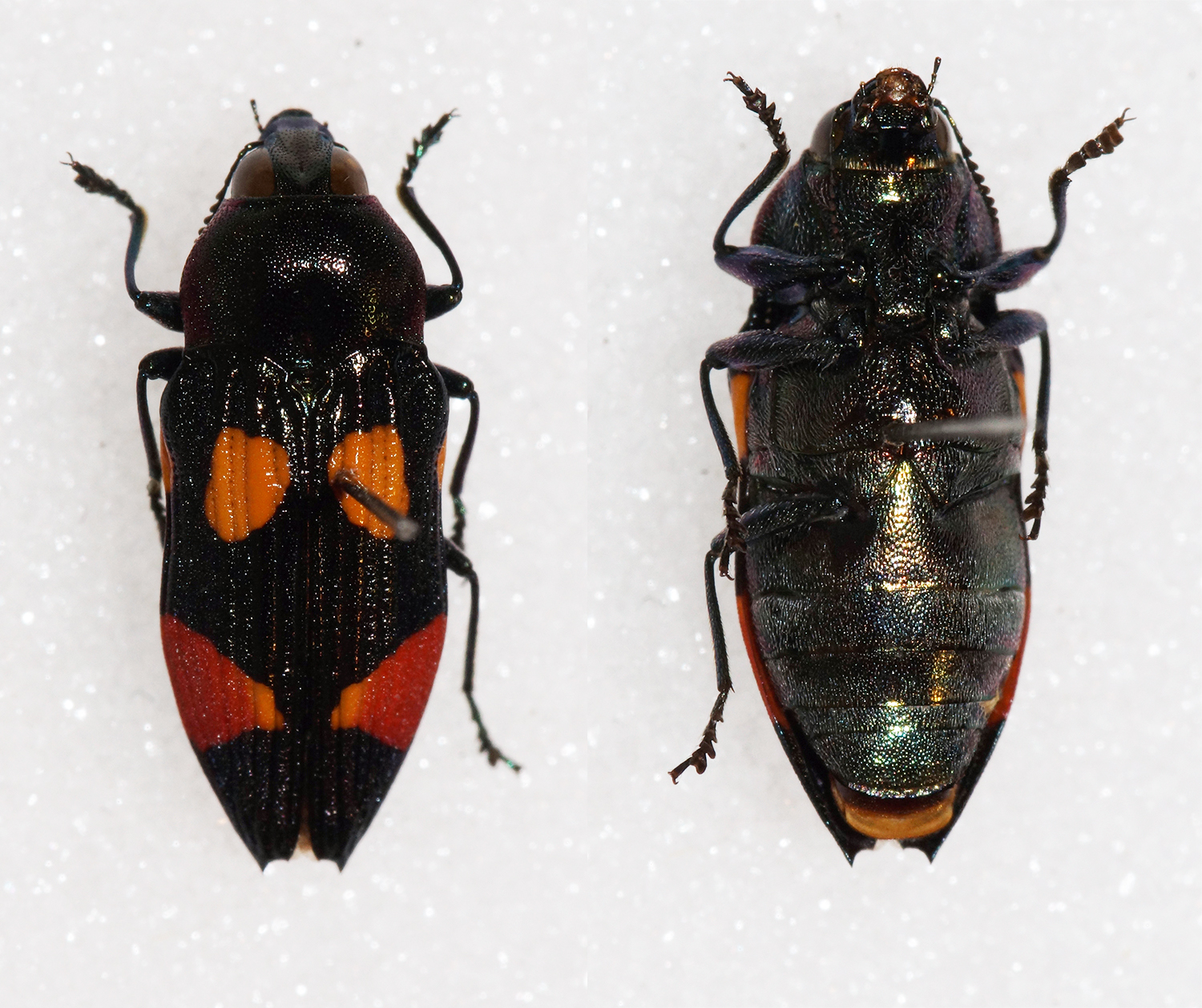

Scientific classification
- Domain: Eukaryota
- Kingdom: Animalia
- Phylum: Arthropoda
- Class: Insecta
- Order: Coleoptera
- Suborder: Polyphaga
- Infraorder: Elateriformia
- Family: Buprestidae
- Genus: Castiarina
- Species: C. aglaia

Binomial name
- Castiarina aglaia (Barker, 1987)

= Castiarina aglaia =

Species of beetle

Castiarina aglaia is a species of beetle of the genus Castiarina and the family Buprestidae. It was scientifically documented by Barker in 1987. This species is native to: Australia, New Guinea and New Zealand
