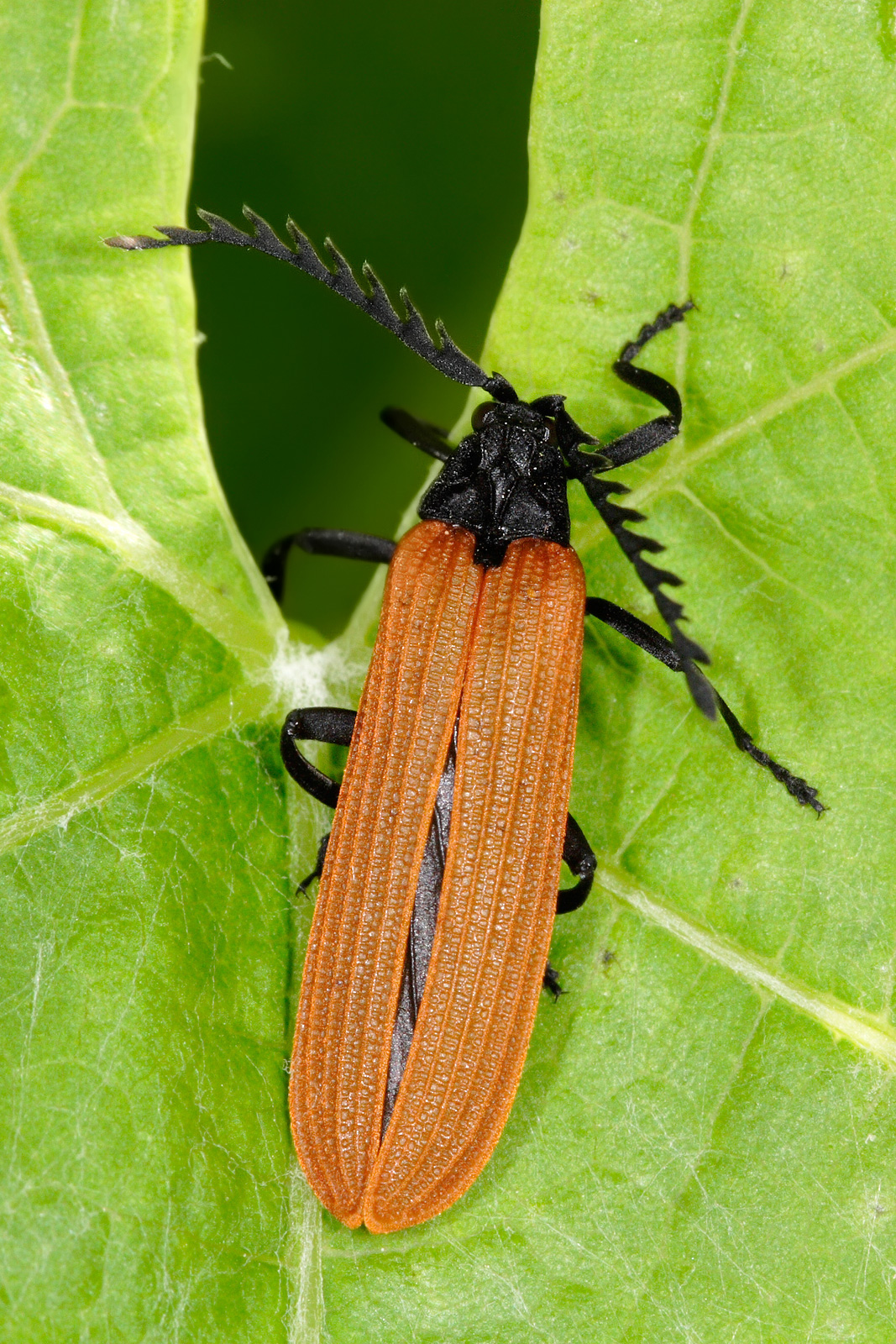
- Porrostoma rhipidius

Scientific classification
- Kingdom: Animalia
- Phylum: Arthropoda
- Class: Insecta
- Order: Coleoptera
- Suborder: Polyphaga
- Infraorder: Elateriformia
- Family: Lycidae
- Tribe: Metriorrhynchini
- Genus: Porrostoma; Laporte, 1838

= Porrostoma =

Genus of beetles

Porrostoma is a genus of net-winged beetles in the family Lycidae, occurring in Australia and New Zealand.

== Taxonomy ==
Most of the >100 species in Porrostoma were formerly placed in other genera such as Metriorrhynchus, and as a result, the spelling of the species names is subject to much confusion in the literature and online sources (e.g.) but under ICZN Article 31 the correct spelling of all adjectival names requires agreement with the neuter gender of the genus, while all names that are nouns (or potentially nouns; e.g., eremita, eucerus, frater, hexastichus, monticola, nigricauda, paradoxa, quinquecavus, rhipidius, and trichocerus) must retain their original spelling, and do not change.

== Species ==
- Porrostoma abdominale Waterhouse
- Porrostoma angustum (Lea)
- Porrostoma apicale Waterhouse
- Porrostoma apicivarium (Lea)
- Porrostoma apterum Lea)
- Porrostoma atratum (Fabricius)
- Porrostoma atriventre Pic
- Porrostoma basale (Lea)
- Porrostoma batesi (Lea)
- Porrostoma breveapicale (Pic)
- Porrostoma brevirostre Waterhouse
- Porrostoma brisbanense (Lea)
- Porrostoma centrale (Macleay)
- Porrostoma cliens (Blackburn)
- Porrostoma compositum (Lea)
- Porrostoma connexum (Lea)
- Porrostoma costicolle (Lea)
- Porrostoma crassipes (Lea)
- Porrostoma cryptoleucum (Lea)
- Porrostoma decipiens (Lea)
- Porrostoma dentipes (Lea)
- Porrostoma diffusimaculatum (Kleine)
- Porrostoma disconigrum (Lea)
- Porrostoma elongatum (Macleay)
- Porrostoma eremita (Blackburn)
- Porrostoma eucerus (Lea)
- Porrostoma fallax Waterhouse
- Porrostoma femorale (Macleay)
- Porrostoma filirostre (Lea)
- Porrostoma flagellatum (Blackburn)
- Porrostoma flavipenne (Lea)
- Porrostoma flavolimbatum (Lea)
- Porrostoma foliatum (Macleay)
- Porrostoma franklinmuelleri (Kleine)
- Porrostoma frater (Lea)
- Porrostoma fuligineum (Lea)
- Porrostoma funestum (Lea)
- Porrostoma fuscolineatum Waterhouse
- Porrostoma gorhami Pic
- Porrostoma gracile (Lea)
- Porrostoma hackeri (Kleine)
- Porrostoma hexastichus (Lea)
- Porrostoma hirtipes (Macleay)
- Porrostoma inflabellatum Pic
- Porrostoma insignicorne (Lea)
- Porrostoma insignipes (Lea)
- Porrostoma irregulare Waterhouse
- Porrostoma kingense (Lea)
- Porrostoma laterale Redtenbacher
- Porrostoma laterarium (Lea)
- Porrostoma longepilosum (Kleine)
- Porrostoma longicolle (Lea)
- Porrostoma macphersonense Calder
- Porrostoma marginipenne (Lea)
- Porrostoma medionigrum (Lea)
- Porrostoma melaspis Bourgeois
- Porrostoma mentitor (Blackburn)
- Porrostoma militare (Lea)
- Porrostoma mimicum (Lea)
- Porrostoma minor (Lea)
- Porrostoma minutum (Lea)
- Porrostoma mirabile Pic
- Porrostoma modicum (Lea)
- Porrostoma moerens (Lea)
- Porrostoma mollicolle (Lea)
- Porrostoma monticola (Blackburn)
- Porrostoma nigricauda (Kleine)
- Porrostoma nigripes (Macleay)
- Porrostoma occidentale (Blackburn)
- Porrostoma opacum (Lea)
- Porrostoma ordinarium (Lea)
- Porrostoma pallidominor (Lea)
- Porrostoma paradoxa (Blackburn)
- Porrostoma parvonigrum (Lea)
- Porrostoma pectinicorne (Lea)
- Porrostoma pertenue (Lea)
- Porrostoma posticale (Macleay)
- Porrostoma pusillum (Kleine)
- Porrostoma queenslandicum (Kleine)
- Porrostoma quinquecavus (Lea)
- Porrostoma ramicorne (Lea)
- Porrostoma rhipidius (Macleay)
- Porrostoma ruficolle (Lea)
- Porrostoma rufipenne (Fabricius)
- Porrostoma rufirostre (Lea)
- Porrostoma rufomarginatum (Lea)
- Porrostoma russatum Waterhouse
- Porrostoma scalare Waterhouse
- Porrostoma sculpticolle (Lea)
- Porrostoma semiflavum (Lea)
- Porrostoma semiochraceum (Pic)
- Porrostoma serraticorne (Macleay)
- Porrostoma simsoni (Lea)
- Porrostoma sinuaticolle Pic
- Porrostoma tamborinense Calder
- Porrostoma tenebricosum (Kleine)
- Porrostoma textile Waterhouse
- Porrostoma tibiale (Lea)
- Porrostoma togatum Waterhouse
- Porrostoma tricavicolle (Lea)
- Porrostoma trichocerus (Lea)
- Porrostoma uniforme Waterhouse
- Porrostoma variipenne (Lea)
- Porrostoma vittatum (Blackburn)
