= Euabalong West =

Euabalong West New South Wales
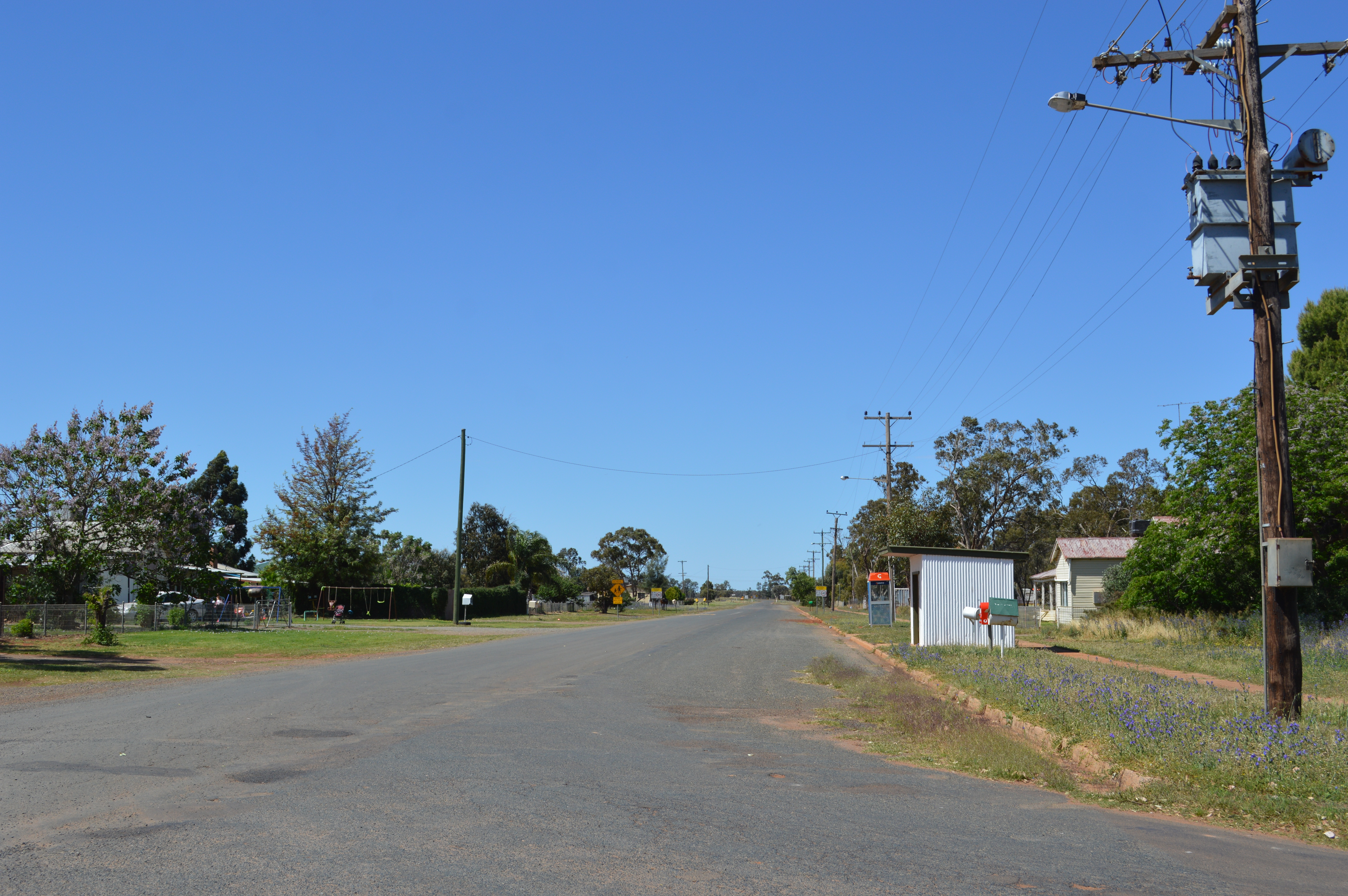
- Uabba Street, the main street of Euabalong West

- Coordinates: 33°04′S 146°24′E
- Population: 66 (2016 census)
- Established: 1870s
- Postcode(s): 2877
- LGA(s): Cobar Shire

Euabalong West is a small town on the Broken Hill Railway Line that was founded to serve the residents of nearby Euabalong, which was a crossing point for the Lachlan River founded in the 1870s. The town has a population of approximately 70 people, and its main industries are cropping, grazing, and railway-related employment.

Euabalong West railway station opened in 1919 and is served by the weekly Indian Pacific train between Sydney and Perth. NSW TrainLink's weekly Outback Xplorer also serves the town.

The town was the scene of a major freight derailment in January 2007, when a freight train carrying chemicals derailed and spilled wreckage over a 1.5 kilometres (0.93 mi) zone, blocking all rail traffic between Adelaide and Sydney.

== Gallery ==
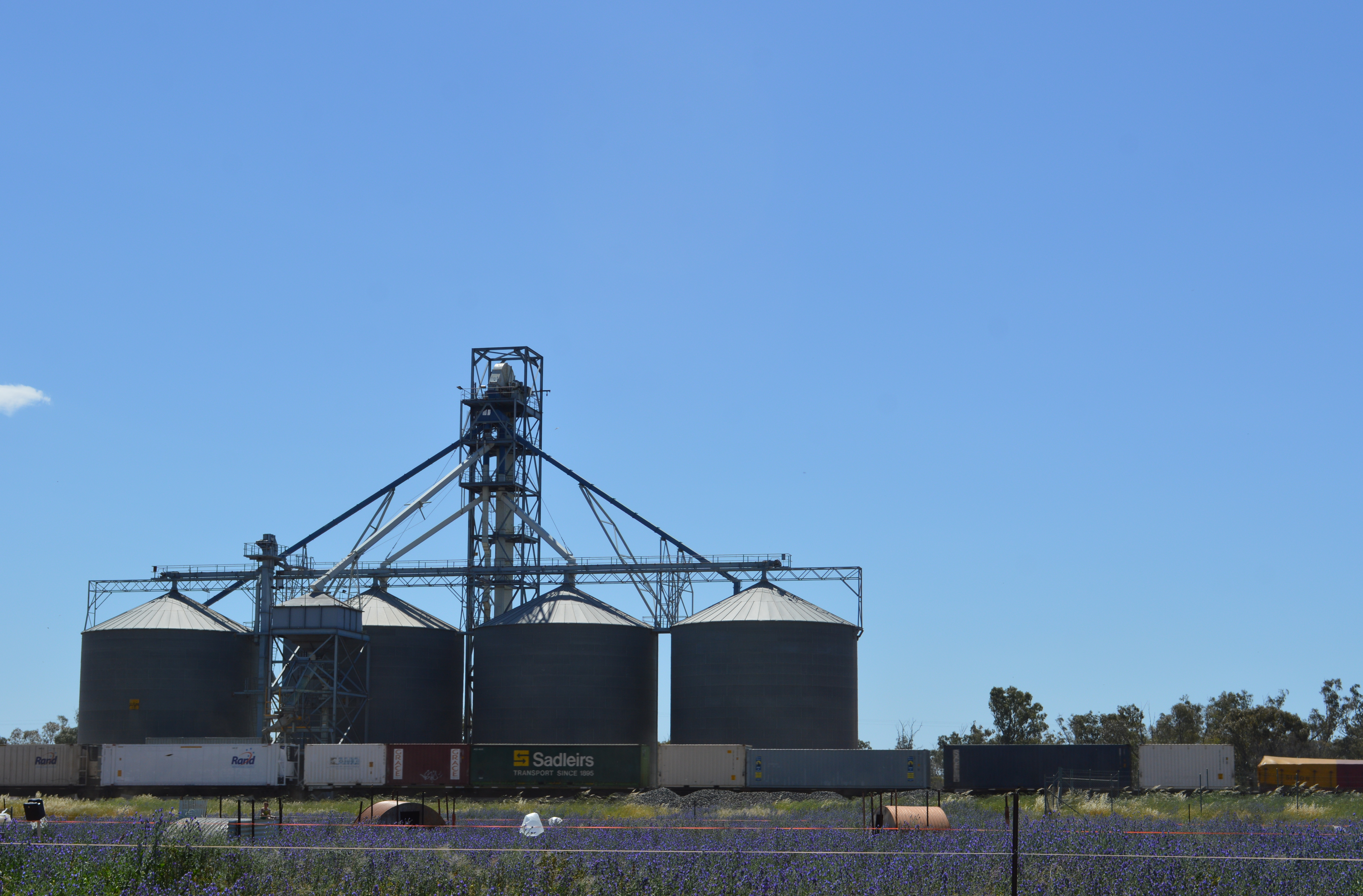
Euabalong Grain Elevator

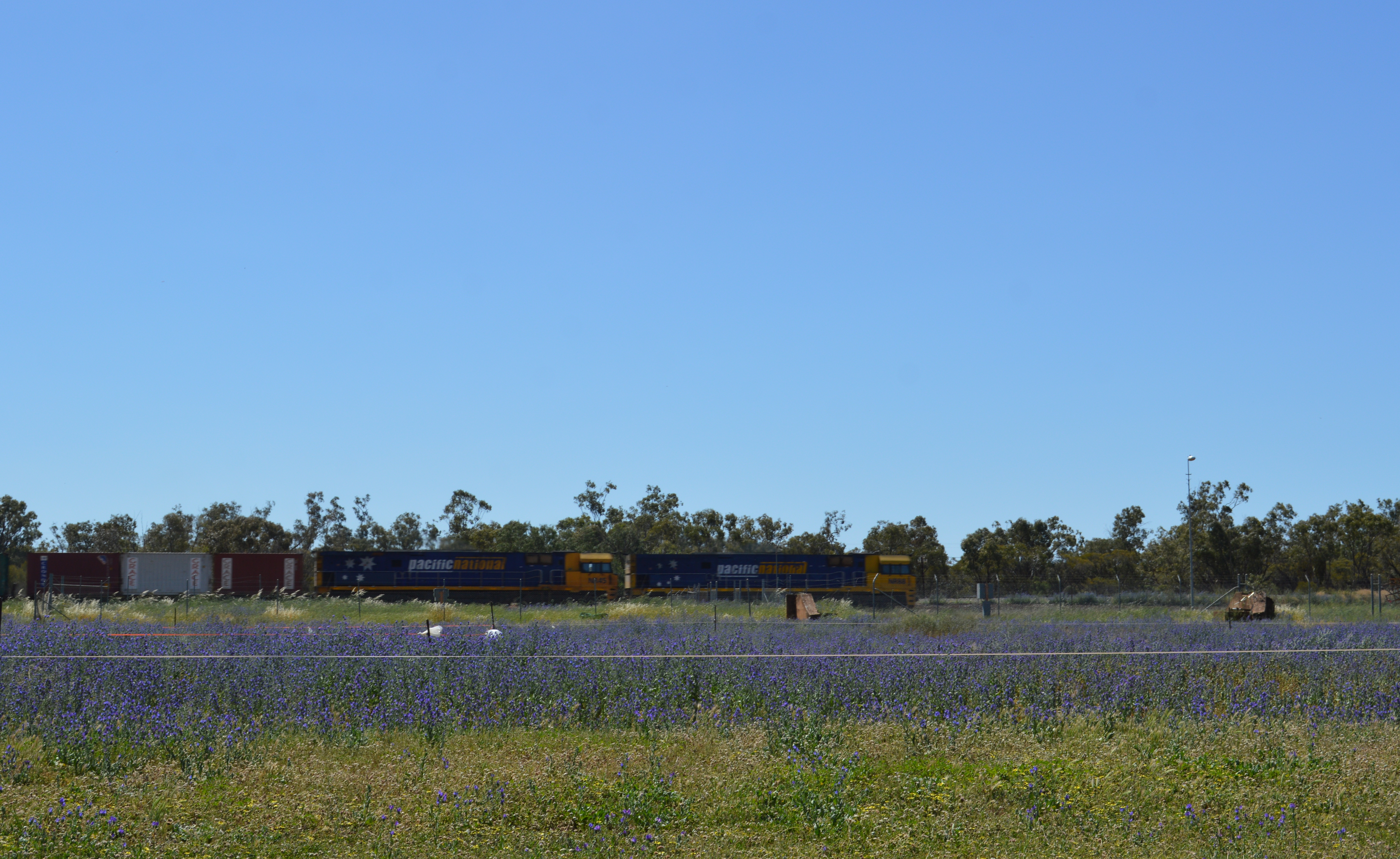
Euabalong West
