= List of presidents of the Société entomologique de France =

List of presidents of the Société entomologique de France:

- 1832 Jean Guillaume Audinet-Serville (1775–1858)
- 1833 Amédée Louis Michel le Peletier, comte de Saint-Fargeau (1770–1845)
- 1834 Jean Victoire Audouin (1797–1841)
- 1835 Charles Athanase Walckenaer (1771–1852)
- 1836 Philogène Auguste Joseph Duponchel (1774–1846)
- 1837 Jean Victoire Audouin (1797–1841) (second term)
- 1838 Jean-Baptiste Alphonse Dechauffour de Boisduval (1799–1879)
- 1839 Jules Pierre Rambur (1801–1870)
- 1840 Pierre François Marie Auguste Dejean (1780–1845)
- 1841 Charles Athanase Walckenaer (1771–1852) (second term)
- 1842 Charles Nicholas Aubé (1802–1869)
- 1843 Henri Milne-Edwards (1800–1885)
- 1844 Ferdinando Arborio Gattinara di Breme (1807–1869)
- 1845 Claude Charles Goureau (1790–1879)
- 1846 Félix Édouard Guérin-Méneville (1799–1874)
- 1847 Louis Jérôme Reiche (1799–1890)
- 1848 Charles Jean-Baptiste Amyot (1799–1866)
- 1849 Achille Guenée (1809–1880)
- 1850 Louis Alexandre Auguste Chevrolat (1799–1884)
- 1851 Louis Jérôme Reiche (1799–1890) (second term)
- 1852 Claude Charles Goureau (1790–1879) (second term)
- 1853 Jean-Baptiste Alphonse Dechauffour de Boisduval (1799–1879) (second term)
- 1854 Léon Fairmaire (1820–1906)
- 1855 Frédéric Jules Sichel (1802–1868)
- 1856 Louis Jérôme Reiche (1799–1890) (third term)
- 1857 Jean-Baptiste Eugène Bellier de la Chavignerie (1819–1888)
- 1858 Jean-Baptiste Alphonse Dechauffour de Boisduval (1799–1879) (third term)
- 1859 Jacques Marie François Bigot (1818–1893)
- 1860 Joseph Alexandre Laboulbène (1825–1898)
- 1861 Victor Antoine Signoret (1816–1889)
- 1862 Louis Alexandre Auguste Chevrolat (1799–1884) (second term)
- 1863 Louis Jérôme Reiche (1799–1890) (fourth term)
- 1864 Charles Nicholas Aubé (1802–1869) (second term)
- 1865 Auguste Jean François Grenier (1814–1890)
- 1866 Auguste Simon Paris (1794–1869)
- 1867 Maurice Jean Auguste Girard (1822–1886)
- 1868 Jean Étienne Berce (1803–1879)
- 1869 Paul Gervais (1816–1879)
- 1870 Joseph-Étienne Giraud (1808–1877)
- 1871 Sylvain Auguste de Marseul (1812–1890)
- 1872 Joseph Alexandre Laboulbène (1825–1898) (second term)
- 1873 Charles N. F. Brisout de Barneville (1822–1893)
- 1874 Charles Eugène Leprieur (1815–1892)
- 1875 Eugène Simon (1848–1924)
- 1876 Paul Mabille (1835–1923)
- 1877 Louis Jérôme Reiche (1799–1890) (fifth term)
- 1878 Paul Gervais (1816–1879) (second term)
- 1879 Jean Pierre Mégnin (1828–1905)
- 1880 Charles Eugène Leprieur (1815–1892) (second term)
- 1881 Léon Marc Herminie Fairmaire (1820–1906) (second term)
- 1882 Louis Jérôme Reiche (1799–1890) (sixth term)
- 1883 Victor Antoine Signoret (1816–1889) (second term)
- 1884 Édouard Lefèvre (1839–1894)
- 1885 Émile Louis Ragonot (1843–1895)
- 1886 Jules Bourgeois (1847–1911)
- 1887 Eugène Simon (1848–1924) (second term)
- 1888 Jules Künckel d'Herculais (1843–1918)
- 1889 Joseph Alexandre Laboulbène (1825–1898) (second term)
- 1890 Paul Mabille (1835–1923) (second term)
- 1891 Antoine Henri Grouvelle (1843–1917)
- 1892 Camille Jourdheuille (1830–1909)
- 1893 Édouard Lefèvre (1839–1894) (second term)
- 1894 Félix de Vuillefroy-Cassini (1841–1918)
- 1895 Émile Louis Ragonot (1843–1895) (second term)
- 1896 Alfred Giard (1846–1908)
- 1897 Antoine Henri Grouvelle (1843–1917) (second term)
- 1898 Louis-Eugène Bouvier (1856–1944)
- 1899 Charles A. Alluaud (1861–1949)
- 1900 Alfred Giard (1846–1908) (second term)
- 1901 Eugène Simon (1848–1924) (third term)
- 1902 Henri W. Brölemann (1860–1933)
- 1903 Louis-Félix Henneguy (1850–1928)
- 1904 Paul Mabille (1835–1923) (third term)
- 1905 Albert Leveillé (died 1911)
- 1906 Paul Marchal (1862–1942)
- 1907 Pierre Lesne (1871–1949)
- 1908 Joseph de Joannis (1864–1932)
- 1909 Jules Künckel d'Herculais (1843–1918) (second term)
- 1910 Maurice Maindron (1857–1911)
- 1911 Armand Janet
- 1912 Jules de Gaulle (1850–1922)
- 1913 Charles Joseph Sainte-Claire Deville (1814–1876)
- 1914 Charles A. Alluaud (1861–1949) (second term)
- 1915 Étienne Rabaud (1868–1956)
- 1916 Joseph de Joannis (1864–1932) (second term)
- 1917 Henri Jean Desbordes (1856–1940)
- 1918 Paul Marchal (1862–1942) (second term)
- 1919 E. Moreau
- 1920 Julien Achard (1881–1925)
- 1921 Jacques M.R. Surcouf (1873–1934)
- 1922 Auguste Eugène Méquignon (1875–1958)
- 1923 Étienne Rabaud (1868–1956) (second term)
- 1924 François Picard (1879–1939)
- 1925 Raymond Peschet (1880–1940)
- 1926 Louis Sémichon
- 1927 Émile Roubaud (1882–1962)
- 1928 Louis Dupont
- 1929 Pierre Marié
- 1930 Paul Vayssière (1889–1984)
- 1931 Constantin Dumont (1849–1932)
- 1932 René Gabriel Jeannel (1879–1965)
- 1933 L.H. Berthet
- 1934 Louis Fage (1883–1964)
- 1935 Victor Laboissière (1875–1942)
- 1936 Charles Fagniez
- 1937 Victor Laboissière (1875–1942) (second term)
- 1938 Pierre Lesne (1871–1949)
- 1939 André Théry (1864–1947)
- 1940 J. de Lépiney
- 1941 Pierre-Paul Grassé (1895–1985)
- 1942 André Maublanc (1880–1958)
- 1943 Henri Stempffer (1894–1978)
- 1944 Lucien Berland (1888–1962)
- 1945 Émile Licent (1876–1952)
- 1946 Lucien Marceron (1892–1966)
- 1947 R. Poutiers
- 1948 Alfred Balachowsky (1901–1983)
- 1949 S. Lemarchand
- 1950 J. Balazuc
- 1951 Pierre Lepesme
- 1952 Robert-Philippe Dollfus
- 1953 Claude Herbulot (1908–2006)
- 1954 G. Pécoud (1883–1970)
- 1955 Paul Pesson
- 1956 Gaston Ruter (1898–1979)
- 1957 Hervé de Toulgoët (1911–2009)
- 1958 Emile Rivalier (1892–1979)
- 1959 A. Roudier
- 1960 Guy Colas
- 1961 H. Bertrand (1892–1978)
- 1962 Général P. Dispons
- 1963 Germaine Cousin
- 1964 P. Rebillard
- 1965 Henri Henrot
- 1966 J. Carayon
- 1967 Henri Oberthür
- 1968 André Villiers (1915–1983)
- 1969 J. Jarrige (1904–1975)
- 1970 A. Badonnel
- 1971 B. Possompès
- 1972 Claude Lemaire (1921–2004)
- 1973 C. Rungs
- 1974 E. Biliotti
- 1975 J. Péricart
- 1976 J. R. Le Berre
- 1977 Jacques Nègre (1908–1988)
- 1978 F. Pierre (1918–1990)
- 1979 A. Vachon (died 1983)
- 1980 J. Bergerard
- 1981 Adrien Roudier
- 1982 Renaud Paulian (1913–2003)
- 1983 Jacques Chassain
- 1984 Claude Caussanel
- 1985 J. Péricart
- 1986 J. Bergerard
- 1987–1988: Paul Pesson (1911–1989)
- 1989–1990: Armand Matocq
- 1991–1992: Jacques Pierre
- 1993–1994: Gérhard H. Perrault
- 1995–1996: Jean-Louis Dommanget
- 1997–1998: G. H. Perrault
- 1999–2000: Claude Girard
- 2001–2002: Imré Foldi
- 2003: Jacques Forel
- 2004–2005: Thierry Deuve
- 2006–2007: Yves Gomy
- 2008–2009: Roger Roy
- 2010–2011: Philippe Magnien
- 2012–2013: Daniel Rougon
- 2014–2015: Hubert Piguet
- 2016–2017: Philippe Ponel
- 2018: Laurent Péru
- 2019–2020: Philippe Le Gall
- 2021–2022: Bernard Moncoutier
