= List of Plateros species =

This is a list of species in the genus Plateros.

== Plateros species ==
- Plateros arizonensis Green, 1953
- Plateros australis Green, 1953
- Plateros avians Green, 1953
- Plateros batillifer Green, 1953
- Plateros bidens Green, 1953
- Plateros bispiculatus Green, 1953
- Plateros borealis Green, 1953
- Plateros capillaris Green, 1953
- Plateros capitatus Green, 1953
- Plateros carinulatus Green, 1953
- Plateros centralis Green, 1953
- Plateros coccinicollis Fall, 1910
- Plateros devians Green, 1953
- Plateros flavoscutellatus Blatchley, 1914
- Plateros floralis (Melsheimer, 1845)
- Plateros knulli Green, 1953
- Plateros lictor (Newman, 1838)
- Plateros modestus (Say, 1835)
- Plateros nigerrimus Schaeffer, 1908
- Plateros nigrior Green, 1953
- Plateros ocularis Green, 1953
- Plateros perditus Green, 1953
- Plateros peregrinus Green, 1953
- Plateros roseimargo Fall, 1910
- Plateros sanguinicollis Horn, 1894
- Plateros sollicitus (LeConte, 1847)
- Plateros subfurcatus Green, 1953
- Plateros subtortus Green, 1953
- Plateros timidus (LeConte, 1847)
- Plateros transpictus Green, 1953
- Plateros tumacacori Green, 1953
- Plateros volatus Green, 1953
