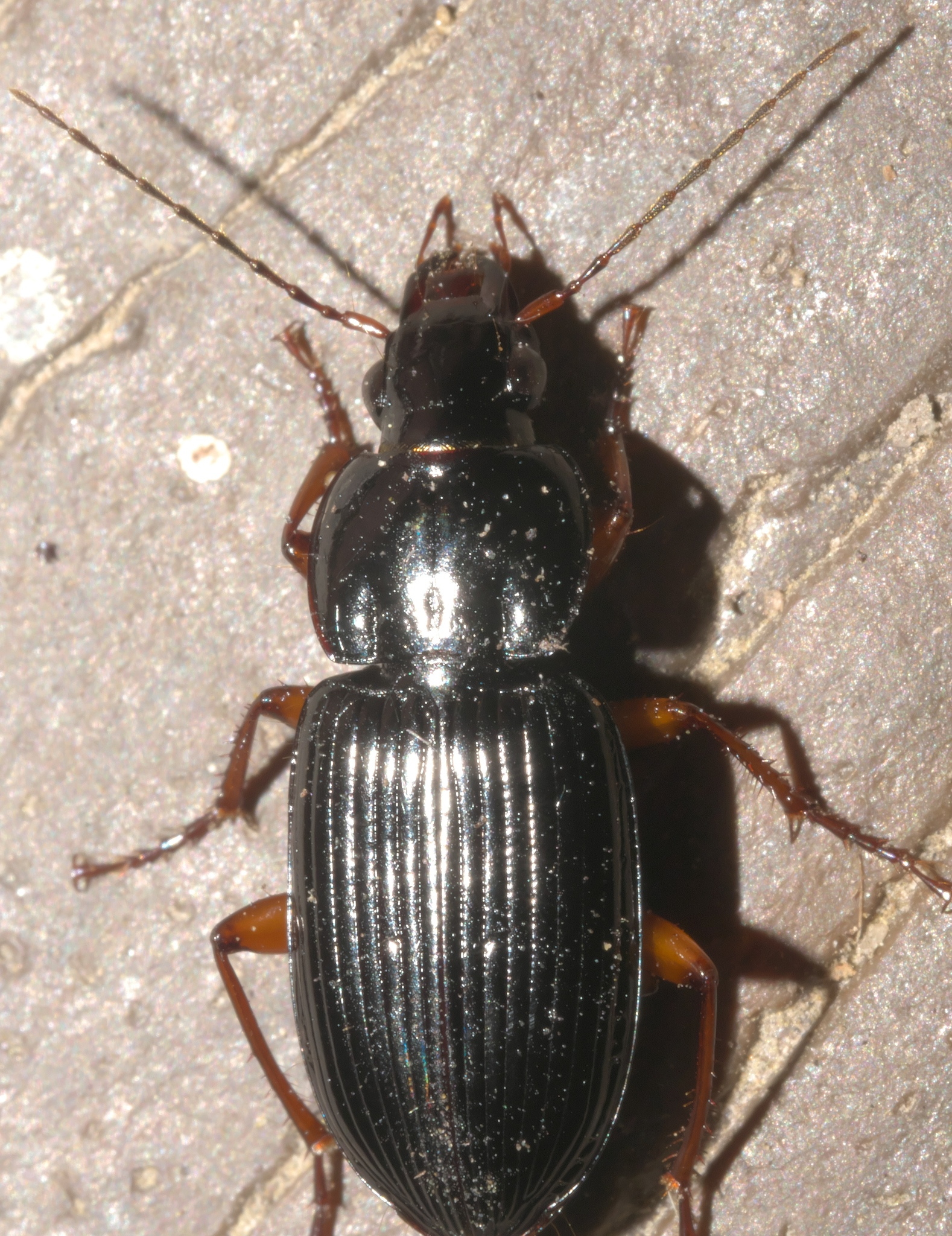
- Oxycrepis recta, Oklahoma

Scientific classification
- Domain: Eukaryota
- Kingdom: Animalia
- Phylum: Arthropoda
- Class: Insecta
- Order: Coleoptera
- Suborder: Adephaga
- Family: Carabidae
- Subfamily: Pterostichinae
- Tribe: Pterostichini
- Genus: Oxycrepis; Reiche, 1843

Subgenera
- Adrimus Bates, 1872; Loxandrus LeConte, 1853; Metoncidus Bates, 1871; Oxycrepis Reiche, 1843; Stolonis Motschulsky, 1866

= Oxycrepis =

Genus of beetles

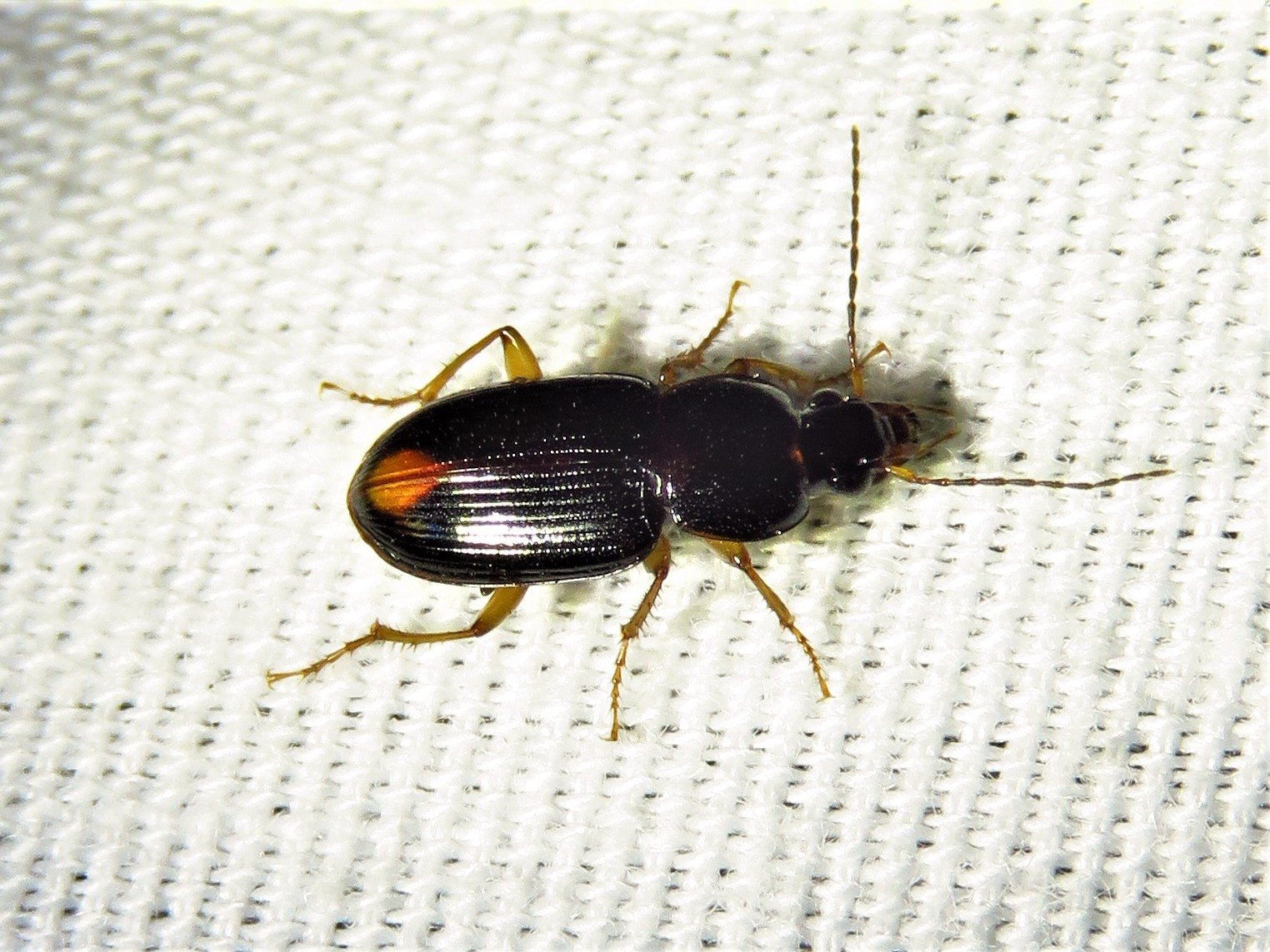
Oxycrepis, Texas

Oxycrepis is a genus in the beetle family Carabidae, first described by Louis Jérôme Reiche in 1843. There are more than 260 described species in Oxycrepis, found in North, Central, and South America, as well as Australia.

== Species ==
These 264 species belong to the genus Oxycrepis.

- Oxycrepis accelerans (Casey, 1918) (United States)
- Oxycrepis adrimoides (Straneo, 1991) (Brazil)
- Oxycrepis aenescens (Tschitscherine, 1900) (Brazil)
- Oxycrepis affinis (Tschitscherine, 1900) (Venezuela)
- Oxycrepis agilis (Dejean, 1828) (United States)
- Oxycrepis algida (Allen, 1972) (United States)
- Oxycrepis alutona Will, 2020 (Venezuela)
- Oxycrepis amatona Will, 2020 (Brazil)
- Oxycrepis amplicollis (Sloane, 1903) (Australia)
- Oxycrepis amplithorax (Straneo, 1991) (Ecuador)
- Oxycrepis anchomenoides (Straneo, 1955) (Brazil)
- Oxycrepis anthracina (Allen & Ball, 1979) (Mexico)
- Oxycrepis apicalis (G.R.Waterhouse, 1841) (Argentina)
- Oxycrepis apicata (Bates, 1871) (Brazil)
- Oxycrepis argentina (Tschitscherine, 1900) (Argentina)
- Oxycrepis arvulap Will, 2020 (Colombia)
- Oxycrepis assimilis (Dejean, 1831) (Argentina)
- Oxycrepis atra (Tschitscherine, 1901) (Venezuela)
- Oxycrepis attenuata (Bates, 1871) (Brazil)
- Oxycrepis audouini (G.R.Waterhouse, 1841) (Argentina)
- Oxycrepis australica (Csiki, 1930) (Australia)
- Oxycrepis australiensis (Sloane, 1895) (Australia)
- Oxycrepis balli (Allen, 1972) (Mexico)
- Oxycrepis binotata (Allen & Ball, 1979) (Mexico)
- Oxycrepis boliviana (Tschitscherine, 1900) (Bolivia)
- Oxycrepis bonariensis (Straneo, 1991) (Argentina)
- Oxycrepis brasiliensis Tschitscherine, 1900 (Brazil)
- Oxycrepis brevicollis (LeConte, 1846) (United States)
- Oxycrepis brevis (Straneo, 1991) (Ecuador)
- Oxycrepis brullei (G.R.Waterhouse, 1841) (Argentina)
- Oxycrepis brunnea (Sloane, 1903) (Australia)
- Oxycrepis brunneicornis (Straneo, 1991) (Brazil)
- Oxycrepis brunnescens (Straneo, 1949) (Paraguay)
- Oxycrepis calathoides (Bates, 1871) (Brazil)
- Oxycrepis castanipes (Straneo, 1991) (Ecuador)
- Oxycrepis catenaria (Will, 2005) (Ecuador)
- Oxycrepis catharinae (Tschitscherine, 1900) (Brazil)
- Oxycrepis celebensis (Bates, 1871) (Indonesia)
- Oxycrepis celeris (Dejean, 1828) (United States)
- Oxycrepis cervicalis (Casey, 1918) (United States)
- Oxycrepis charrua (Anichtchenko, 2009) (Argentina)
- Oxycrepis cincinnati (Casey, 1924) (United States)
- Oxycrepis circulus (Allen, 1972) (United States)
- Oxycrepis claripes (Straneo, 1993) (Brazil)
- Oxycrepis collucens (Casey, 1918) (United States)
- Oxycrepis confusa (Dejean, 1831) (Argentina)
- Oxycrepis conspicua (Mateu, 2000) (Argentina)
- Oxycrepis cordata Tschitscherine, 1900 (Brazil)
- Oxycrepis crenata (LeConte, 1853) (United States)
- Oxycrepis crepera (Bates, 1872) (Brazil)
- Oxycrepis cribratella (Straneo, 1991) (Bolivia)
- Oxycrepis cubana (Tschitscherine, 1903) (Cuba)
- Oxycrepis curtata (Tschitscherine, 1903) (Uruguay)
- Oxycrepis curtatoides (Straneo, 1949) (Paraguay)
- Oxycrepis curtonota (Bates, 1871) (Brazil)
- Oxycrepis cuyabana (Straneo, 1991) (Brazil)
- Oxycrepis davisoni (Straneo, 1991) (Brazil)
- Oxycrepis defanisi (Straneo, 1991) (Argentina)
- Oxycrepis depressibasis (Straneo, 1991) (Argentina)
- Oxycrepis dimidiaticornis (Dejean, 1828) (Brazil)
- Oxycrepis discolor (Allen, 1972) (Panama)
- Oxycrepis dubius (Curtis, 1839) (Argentina and Uruguay)
- Oxycrepis duryi (Wright, 1939) (United States)
- Oxycrepis ecuadorica (Straneo, 1991) (Ecuador)
- Oxycrepis egae (Straneo, 1949) (Brazil)
- Oxycrepis elaphropus (Tschitscherine, 1898) (Brazil)
- Oxycrepis elegans (Dejean, 1831) (Colombia)
- Oxycrepis elnae (Allen, 1972) (Mexico)
- Oxycrepis elongata (Allen, 1972) (Mexico)
- Oxycrepis elytralis (Straneo, 1993) (Bolivia)
- Oxycrepis epiphytus (Will, 2004) (Peru)
- Oxycrepis erratica (Dejean, 1828) (United States)
- Oxycrepis extenda (Allen, 1972) (United States)
- Oxycrepis fasciata (Tschitscherine, 1900) (Brazil)
- Oxycrepis fasciolata (Tschitscherine, 1900) (Venezuela)
- Oxycrepis flavicauda (Tschitscherine, 1900) (Venezuela)
- Oxycrepis floridana (LeConte, 1878) (United States)
- Oxycrepis franiai (Straneo, 1991) (Bolivia)
- Oxycrepis fraus (Allen, 1972) (Mexico)
- Oxycrepis fulva (Straneo, 1991) (Brazil)
- Oxycrepis fulvicornis (Bates, 1871) (Brazil)
- Oxycrepis fulvostigma (Bates, 1871) (Brazil)
- Oxycrepis fuscipes (Brullé, 1835) (French Guiana and Brazil)
- Oxycrepis gagatina (Laporte, 1867) (Australia)
- Oxycrepis gebi Will, 2020 (Brazil)
- Oxycrepis geminata (Bates, 1872) (Brazil)
- Oxycrepis gibba (Allen, 1972) (United States)
- Oxycrepis gracilis (Bates, 1871) (Brazil)
- Oxycrepis gracilus (Will, 2004) (Peru)
- Oxycrepis gravescens (Bates, 1871) (Brazil)
- Oxycrepis guttula (Tschitscherine, 1901) (Venezuela)
- Oxycrepis humeralis (Straneo, 1991) (Bolivia)
- Oxycrepis icarus (Will & Liebherr, 1998) (United States)
- Oxycrepis idiocentra (Tschitscherine, 1898) (Brazil)
- Oxycrepis infima (Bates, 1882) (United States, Guatemala, Mexico, Hispaniola)
- Oxycrepis integra (Tschitscherine, 1900) (Argentina)
- Oxycrepis intercepta (Chaudoir, 1874) (United States and Mexico)
- Oxycrepis interruptua (Tschitscherine, 1900) (Colombia)
- Oxycrepis iricolor (Straneo, 1991) (Brazil)
- Oxycrepis iridea (Straneo, 1949) (Paraguay)
- Oxycrepis janeirana (Straneo, 1991) (Brazil)
- Oxycrepis kayae (Straneo, 1991) (Brazil)
- Oxycrepis kochalkai (Straneo, 1991) (Paraguay)
- Oxycrepis laetipes (Straneo, 1991) (Brazil)
- Oxycrepis laevicollis (Bates, 1871) (Brazil)
- Oxycrepis laevigata (W.J.MacLeay, 1888) (Australia)
- Oxycrepis laevinota Will, 2020 (Brazil)
- Oxycrepis lata (Darlington, 1962) (New Guinea)
- Oxycrepis latibasis (Straneo, 1993) (Argentina)
- Oxycrepis latifascia (Straneo, 1991) (Venezuela)
- Oxycrepis latiuscula (Straneo, 1991) (Brazil)
- Oxycrepis leistoides (Bates, 1871) (Brazil)
- Oxycrepis lepida (Allen, 1972) (Mexico)
- Oxycrepis leucocera Reiche, 1843 (Colombia and Brazil)
- Oxycrepis leucotela (Bates, 1871) (Brazil)
- Oxycrepis littleorum (Allen & Ball, 1979) (Mexico)
- Oxycrepis longiformis (Sloane, 1898) (Australia)
- Oxycrepis longior (Straneo, 1993) (Brazil)
- Oxycrepis longiuscula (Straneo, 1991) (Brazil)
- Oxycrepis lucens (Chaudoir, 1868) (United States)
- Oxycrepis macleayi (Csiki, 1930) (Australia)
- Oxycrepis macrodera (Bates, 1871) (Brazil)
- Oxycrepis macula (Straneo, 1991) (Bolivia)
- Oxycrepis maculata (Straneo, 1958) (Brazil)
- Oxycrepis maindroni (Tschitscherine, 1901) (Venezuela)
- Oxycrepis major (Straneo, 1949) (Paraguay)
- Oxycrepis majuscula (Lorenz, 1998) (Indonesia and New Guinea)
- Oxycrepis marginalis (Straneo, 1991) (Brazil)
- Oxycrepis marginepunctata (Straneo, 1991) (Bolivia)
- Oxycrepis martinezi (Mateu, 1976) (Venezuela)
- Oxycrepis mattoana (Tschitscherine, 1900) (Brazil)
- Oxycrepis media (Darlington, 1962) (Indonesia and New Guinea)
- Oxycrepis melas (Straneo, 1953) (Brazil)
- Oxycrepis micans (Chaudoir, 1868) (United States)
- Oxycrepis micantina (Csiki, 1930) (Australia)
- Oxycrepis micantior (Blackburn, 1903) (Australia)
- Oxycrepis microdera (Bates, 1872) (Brazil)
- Oxycrepis minasiana (Straneo, 1991) (Brazil)
- Oxycrepis minima (Straneo, 1951) (Colombia and Panama)
- Oxycrepis minor (Chaudoir, 1843) (United States and Canada)
- Oxycrepis mirei (Straneo, 1991) (Bolivia)
- Oxycrepis modica (Tschitscherine, 1901) (Venezuela)
- Oxycrepis moritzi (Tschitscherine, 1898) (Venezuela and Brazil)
- Oxycrepis negrei (Straneo, 1967) (Argentina)
- Oxycrepis nicki (Straneo, 1955) (Bolivia)
- Oxycrepis nitidula (LeConte, 1846) (United States)
- Oxycrepis noaffine Will, 2020 (Brazil)
- Oxycrepis nocticolor (Darlington, 1934) (Cuba)
- Oxycrepis notula (Motschulsky, 1866) (Venezuela)
- Oxycrepis obscura (Straneo, 1949) (Paraguay)
- Oxycrepis olivacea (Bates, 1882) (Guatemala)
- Oxycrepis omiltemi (Allen & Ball, 1979) (Mexico)
- Oxycrepis oophaga (Costa & Vanin, 2011) (Brazil)
- Oxycrepis opacula (Bates, 1871) (Brazil)
- Oxycrepis orbicollis (Straneo, 1991) (Ecuador)
- Oxycrepis ornata (Putzeys, 1878) (Colombia)
- Oxycrepis ornatella (Straneo, 1991) (Paraguay)
- Oxycrepis ovaticollis (Bates, 1871) (Brazil)
- Oxycrepis pactinullus (Allen, 1972) (United States and Mexico)
- Oxycrepis panamensis (Casey, 1914) (Panama)
- Oxycrepis paraguayensis (Straneo, 1949) (Paraguay)
- Oxycrepis parallela (Casey, 1918) (United States)
- Oxycrepis parvula (Chaudoir, 1868) (United States)
- Oxycrepis paulensis (Straneo, 1993) (Brazil)
- Oxycrepis photophila (Straneo, 1991) (Paraguay)
- Oxycrepis piceola (Chaudoir, 1868) (United States)
- Oxycrepis piciventris (LeConte, 1846) (United States)
- Oxycrepis picta (Tschitscherine, 1900) (Venezuela)
- Oxycrepis picticauda (Bates, 1871) (Brazil)
- Oxycrepis pictoides (Straneo, 1991) (Ecuador)
- Oxycrepis planicollis (Straneo, 1991) (Argentina)
- Oxycrepis planoculis (Straneo, 1991) (Argentina)
- Oxycrepis politissima (Bates, 1871) (Brazil)
- Oxycrepis postica (Brullé, 1843) (Argentina)
- Oxycrepis pravitubus (Allen, 1972) (United States)
- Oxycrepis profundestriata (Straneo, 1991) (Ecuador)
- Oxycrepis proxima (Chaudoir, 1868) (United States)
- Oxycrepis pseudomajor (Straneo, 1991) (Uruguay)
- Oxycrepis punctatissima (Straneo, 1991) (Brazil)
- Oxycrepis punctibasis (Straneo, 1949) (Brazil)
- Oxycrepis punctimargo (Straneo, 1991) (Brazil)
- Oxycrepis punctisulcis (Straneo, 1958) (Brazil)
- Oxycrepis punctulata (Straneo, 1949) (Paraguay)
- Oxycrepis pusilla (LeConte, 1853) (United States)
- Oxycrepis quadribasis (Straneo, 1991) (Bolivia)
- Oxycrepis quadricollis (Sloane, 1903) (Australia)
- Oxycrepis quadrinotata (Bates, 1871) (Brazil)
- Oxycrepis quinaria (Will & Liebherr, 1998) (Bolivia)
- Oxycrepis rasutilis Will, 2020 (Brazil)
- Oxycrepis recta (Say, 1823) (United States)
- Oxycrepis rectangula (LeConte, 1878) (United States)
- Oxycrepis rectibasis (Straneo, 1991) (Bolivia)
- Oxycrepis reflexicollis (Straneo, 1991) (Brazil)
- Oxycrepis remota (Allen, 1972) (Panama)
- Oxycrepis ripicola (Straneo, 1949) (Paraguay)
- Oxycrepis robusta (Allen, 1972) (United States)
- Oxycrepis rossi (Allen, 1972) (United States)
- Oxycrepis rotundata (Straneo, 1991) (Uruguay)
- Oxycrepis rotundicollis (Straneo, 1991) (Peru)
- Oxycrepis rubescens (Bates, 1871) (Brazil)
- Oxycrepis rubricata (Bates, 1891) (Mexico)
- Oxycrepis rubromaculata (Straneo, 1955) (Brazil)
- Oxycrepis rubronigra (Straneo, 1991) (Brazil)
- Oxycrepis rufangulus (Bates, 1872) (Brazil)
- Oxycrepis ruficornis (Tschitscherine, 1900) (Brazil)
- Oxycrepis rufilabris (Laporte, 1867) (Australia)
- Oxycrepis rufostigma (Bates, 1871) (Brazil)
- Oxycrepis saccisecundaris (Allen, 1972) (United States)
- Oxycrepis saphyrina (Chaudoir, 1843) (United States)
- Oxycrepis schadei Emden, 1949 (Paraguay)
- Oxycrepis scortensis (Will, 2005) (Ecuador)
- Oxycrepis sculptilis (Bates, 1884) (United States, Panama, Mexico)
- Oxycrepis semperfidelis (Will, 2008) (Ecuador and Peru)
- Oxycrepis sericea (Straneo, 1955) (Bolivia)
- Oxycrepis sericiventris (Straneo, 1991) (Brazil)
- Oxycrepis similis (Straneo, 1991) (Bolivia)
- Oxycrepis simillima (Straneo, 1991) (Brazil)
- Oxycrepis simplex (Dejean, 1828) (Argentina)
- Oxycrepis sinuata (Straneo, 1991) (Brazil)
- Oxycrepis sinuatella (Straneo, 1991) (Argentina)
- Oxycrepis spinigrandis (Allen, 1972) (Panama)
- Oxycrepis spinilunata (Allen, 1972) (United States)
- Oxycrepis spinosa (Will, 2005) (Ecuador)
- Oxycrepis stenolophoides (Straneo, 1949) (Paraguay)
- Oxycrepis stockwelli (Allen & Ball, 1979) (Mexico)
- Oxycrepis straneoi (Will & Liebherr, 1998) (United States)
- Oxycrepis strigomeroides (Straneo, 1991) (Bolivia and Brazil)
- Oxycrepis subcordicollis (Bates, 1871) (Brazil)
- Oxycrepis subfusca (Tschitscherine, 1900) (Brazil)
- Oxycrepis subgagatina (Laporte, 1867) (Australia)
- Oxycrepis subiridescens (W.J.MacLeay, 1871) (Australia)
- Oxycrepis subparallela (Bates, 1871) (Brazil)
- Oxycrepis subquadrata (Straneo, 1991) (Bolivia)
- Oxycrepis subrecta (Darlington, 1962) (New Guinea)
- Oxycrepis subsinuata (Straneo, 1991) (Brazil)
- Oxycrepis subvittata (Straneo, 1953) (Brazil)
- Oxycrepis sulcata (Bates, 1871) (Brazil)
- Oxycrepis taeniata (LeConte, 1853) (United States)
- Oxycrepis tapiai (Will, 2005) (Ecuador)
- Oxycrepis tenebrionides (Bates, 1871) (Brazil)
- Oxycrepis tetrastigma (Bates, 1871) (Brazil, Nicaragua, Guatemala)
- Oxycrepis trapezicollis (Straneo, 1991) (Paraguay)
- Oxycrepis tropica (Allen, 1972) (Costa Rica)
- Oxycrepis tucumana (Dejean, 1831) (Argentina)
- Oxycrepis uniformis (Allen, 1972) (United States)
- Oxycrepis uniloba (Allen, 1972) (United States)
- Oxycrepis unispina (Allen, 1972) (Panama)
- Oxycrepis unistigma (Bates, 1882) (Guatemala)
- Oxycrepis uruguaica (Tschitscherine, 1903) (Uruguay)
- Oxycrepis variabilis (Straneo, 1991) (Venezuela)
- Oxycrepis velocipes (Casey, 1918) (United States and Canada)
- Oxycrepis velox (Dejean, 1828) (United States)
- Oxycrepis ventralis (Straneo, 1993) (Brazil)
- Oxycrepis virens (Tschitscherine, 1901) (Venezuela)
- Oxycrepis viridescens (Bates, 1871) (Brazil)
- Oxycrepis vittata (Bates, 1871) (Brazil)
- Oxycrepis vulnerata (Casey, 1918) (United States)
- Oxycrepis whiteheadi (Allen, 1972) (Mexico)
- Oxycrepis willinki (Mateu, 1984) (Paraguay)
- Oxycrepis xanthopus (Bates, 1871) (Brazil)
- Oxycrepis xiproma Will, 2020 (Paraguay)
- Oxycrepis yasuni (Will, 2005) (Ecuador)
- Oxycrepis yeariani (Allen, 1972) (Mexico)
- † Oxycrepis gelida (Scudder, 1877)
