= Chaetodera maheva =

Scientific classification
- Kingdom: Animalia
- Phylum: Arthropoda
- Class: Insecta
- Order: Coleoptera
- Suborder: Adephaga
- Family: Cicindelidae
- Genus: Chaetodera
- Species: C. maheva

Binomial name
- Chaetodera maheva (Künckel d'Herculais, 1887)

Synonyms
- Cicindela maheva Künckel d'Herculais, 1887

Species of beetle

Chaetodera maheva is a species of tiger beetle. This species is found in Madagascar.

Adults reach a length of 15-18.5 mm and can be distinguished from related species by the black and yellow elytral markings.
