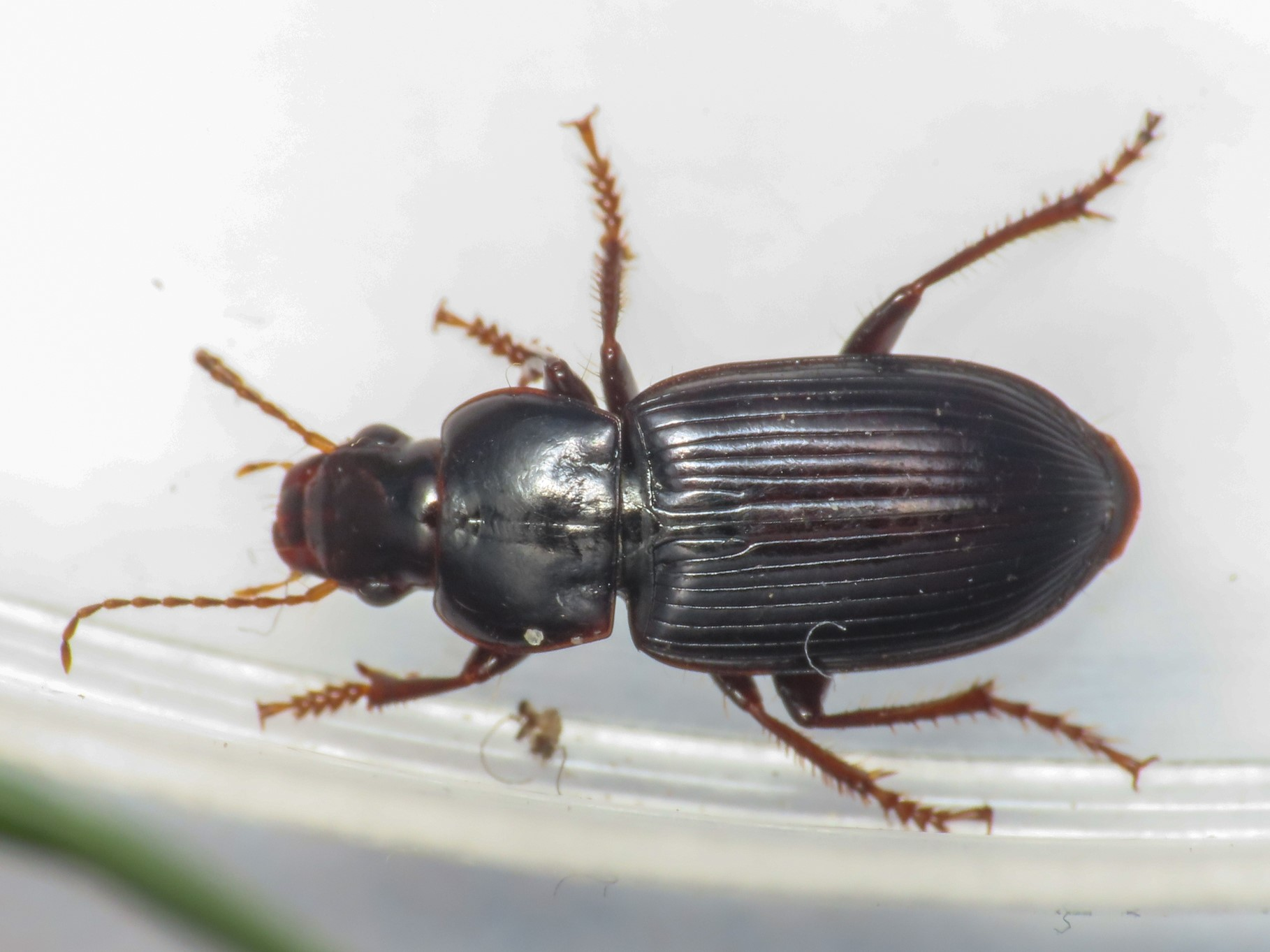

Scientific classification
- Kingdom: Animalia
- Phylum: Arthropoda
- Class: Insecta
- Order: Coleoptera
- Suborder: Adephaga
- Family: Carabidae
- Genus: Harpalus
- Species: H. bellieri

Binomial name
- Harpalus bellieri Reiche, 1861

= Harpalus bellieri =

Species of beetle

Harpalus bellieri is a species of ground beetle in the subfamily Harpalinae. It was first described by Louis Jérôme Reiche in 1861.
