= Maurice Maindron =

French entomologist (1857–1911)

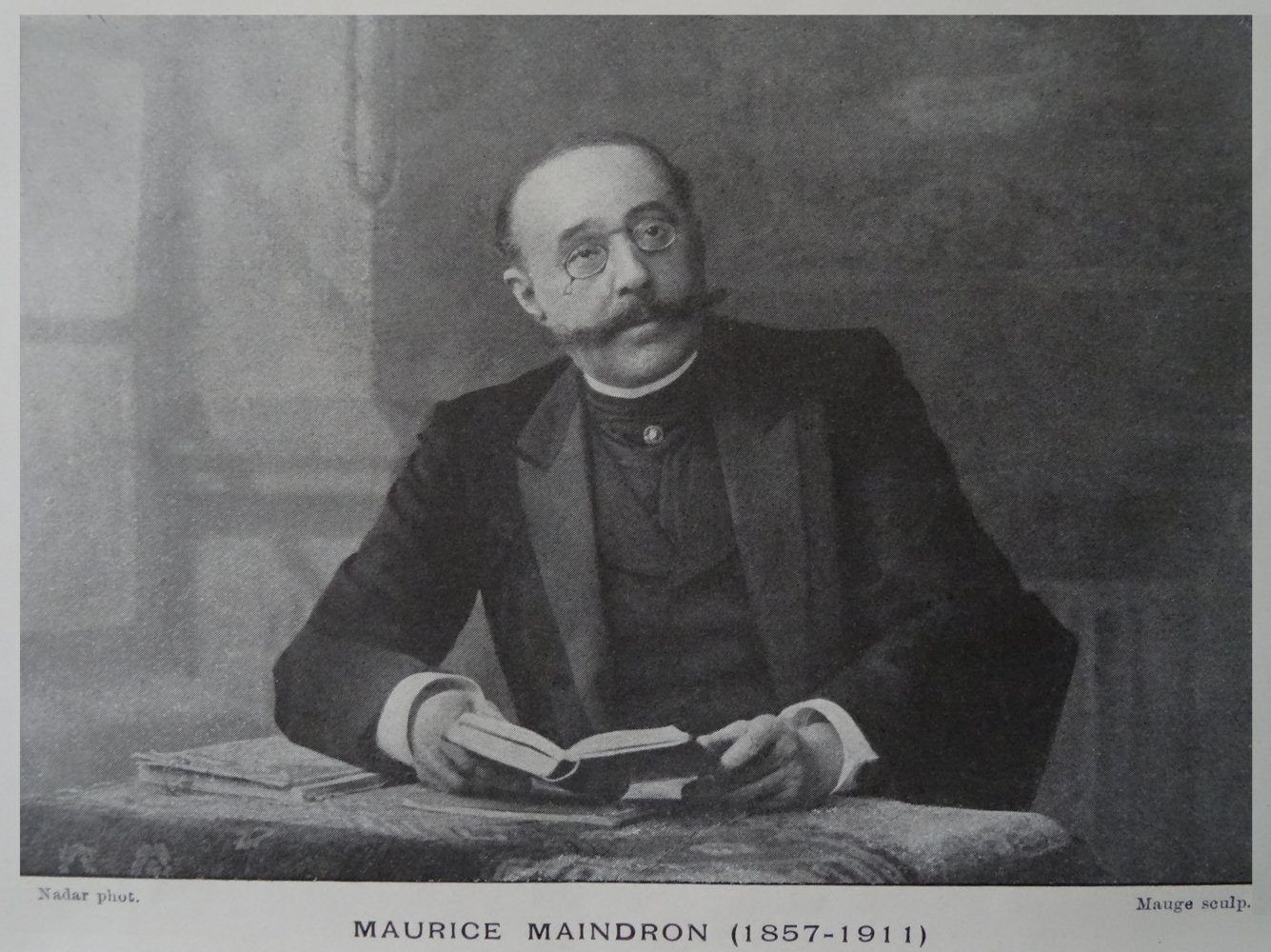
- Born: 7 February 1857; Paris, France
- Died: 19 July 1911 (aged 54)
- Occupation: Entomologist
- Scientific career
- Fields: Entomology

Maurice Maindron (7 February 1857, Paris – 19 July 1911) was a French entomologist.

Maurice Maindron was the son of the engineer and sculptor Hippolyte Maindron. In 1875, already a keen naturalist and entomologist, he attended the Laboratory of the Muséum National d'Histoire Naturelle where Philippe Alexandre Jules Künckel d'Herculais presented him to Émile Blanchard and there he was hired to arrange the Hymenoptera in the museum's collections.

Before the age of 20, he sailed with Achille Raffray to New Guinea (1876–1877).He joined the Société entomologique de France in 1878 then embarked on a series of missions that took him to Senegal (1879), to India (1880–1881), to Indonesia (1884–1885), to Obock and Somalia (1893). In 1896 he collected in Pakistan and Saudi Arabia he was gain in India (1900–1901) and again in Senegal (1904).

Many of these missions were, at least in part, financed by the Museum, and the material was added to the collections. Other specimens were sold to collectors and dealerships.

Maindron is commemorated in the scientific name of a species of lizard, Sphenomorphus maindroni.
