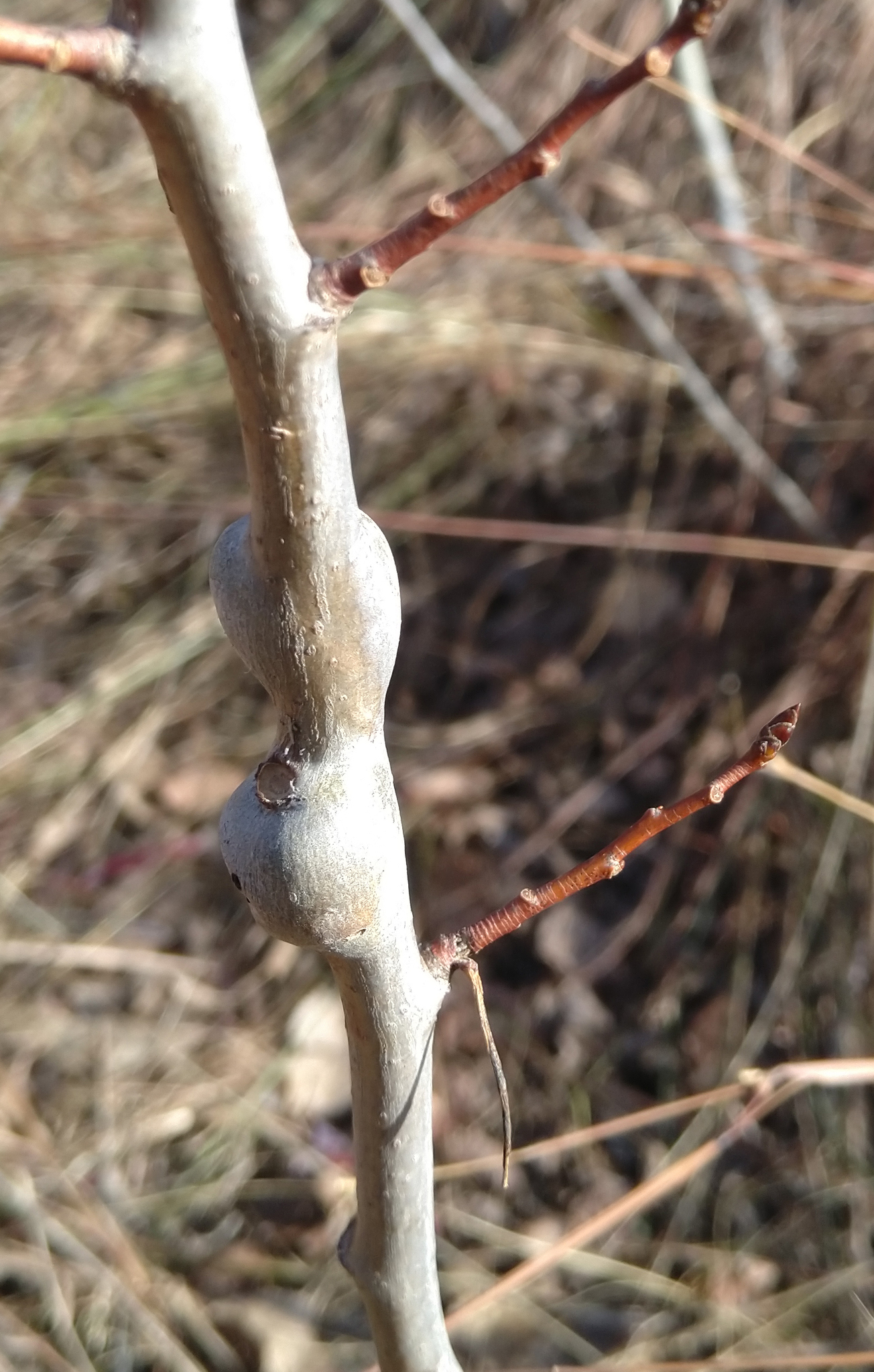
- Euhexomyza schineri gall

Scientific classification
- Kingdom: Animalia
- Phylum: Arthropoda
- Class: Insecta
- Order: Diptera
- Family: Agromyzidae
- Genus: Euhexomyza
- Species: E. schineri

Binomial name
- Euhexomyza schineri (Giraud, 1861)

Synonyms
- Agromyza schineri Giraud, 1861; Hexomyza schineri Giraud, 1861

= Euhexomyza schineri =

Species of fly

Euhexomyza schineri, referred to as the poplar twiggall fly, is a species of fly in the family Agromyzidae that forms galls on many species of poplar.

== Description ==
The smooth gall is a circular-shaped swelling that integrates from new twigs below the bud into the stem. The gall begins to form during the summer, growing during autumn and then overwintering as multiple yellow-green larvae before pupation. Pupation occurs during late winter to early spring, where they drop to the ground as adult flies. During and after the pupae leave the gall, Cytospora canker can develop around the gall, caused by wounds of the pupae leaving or birds attempting to feed on the gall.

The adult flies are approximately 2–4 mm long, stout-bodied, shiny, and dark. When they are active, they rest on leaves during the day.

Quaking aspen (P. tremuloides) is considered to be the main host but has been recorded from many species of poplar.

== Distribution ==
It has been primarily recorded across the West Coast, the Northeast United States, and Southeastern Canada. Some occurrences have been reported in Europe and Asia.

== Parasitoids ==
- Eurytoma contractura Bigbee, 1967 — a parasitoid wasp.
