= Rabaud =

Rabaud may refer to:

- Étienne Rabaud (1868–1956), French zoologist
- Henri Rabaud (1873–1949), French composer
- Ribauldequin, or rabaud, a medieval volley gun
