= Neoserica atrata =

Scientific classification
- Kingdom: Animalia
- Phylum: Arthropoda
- Class: Insecta
- Order: Coleoptera
- Suborder: Polyphaga
- Infraorder: Scarabaeiformia
- Family: Scarabaeidae
- Genus: Neoserica
- Species: N. atrata

Binomial name
- Neoserica atrata (Reiche, 1874)

Synonyms
- Omaloplia atrata Reiche, 1874; Autoserica atrata

Species of beetle

Neoserica atrata is a species of beetle of the family Scarabaeidae. It is found in Ethiopia and Somalia.

== Description ==
Adults reach a length of about 10 mm. The lower surface is evenly brown, while the upper surface is greenish-black-brown, dull and weakly opalescent. The pronotum is densely and finely punctate with tiny, grey hairs. The elytra are punctate in rows, the intervals are quite flat, of equal width, widely punctate, with tiny hairs in the punctures, and distinct white setae arranged in rows.
