= Charles Eugène Leprieur =

French army doctor and entomologist

Charles Eugène Leprieur (8 July 1815 Dieuze – 12 August 1892, Bassing) was a French army doctor and entomologist. He was especially interested in Coleoptera.

Leprieur was at various times stationed in Algeria and Cayenne. He wrote Méthode dichotomique appliquée au genre Stenus. Annales de la Société Entomologique de France 1851.(2)9: 191–202. He was elected president of the Société entomologique de France for the years 1874 and 1880.

His elder brother was French pharmacist and naturalist François Mathias René Leprieur. His eldest son, Charles Leprieur (1848–1881), was also an entomologist and army doctor.
