= Oxycrepis crenata =

Scientific classification
- Kingdom: Animalia
- Phylum: Arthropoda
- Clade: Pancrustacea
- Class: Insecta
- Order: Coleoptera
- Suborder: Adephaga
- Family: Carabidae
- Subfamily: Pterostichinae
- Tribe: Pterostichini
- Genus: Oxycrepis
- Species: O. crenata

Binomial name
- Oxycrepis crenata LeConte, 1852

Synonyms
- Oxycrepis crenatus; Loxandrus crenatus LeConte, 1852; Loxandrus crenulatus Chaudoir, 1868

Species of beetle

Oxycrepis crenata is a species of ground beetle in the family Carabidae. It is found in North America.
