= Oxycrepis icarus =

Scientific classification
- Kingdom: Animalia
- Phylum: Arthropoda
- Class: Insecta
- Order: Coleoptera
- Suborder: Adephaga
- Family: Carabidae
- Genus: Oxycrepis
- Species: O. icarus

Binomial name
- Oxycrepis icarus Will & Liebherr, 1997

Species of beetle

Oxycrepis icarus is a species of ground beetle in the family Carabidae. It is found in North America.
