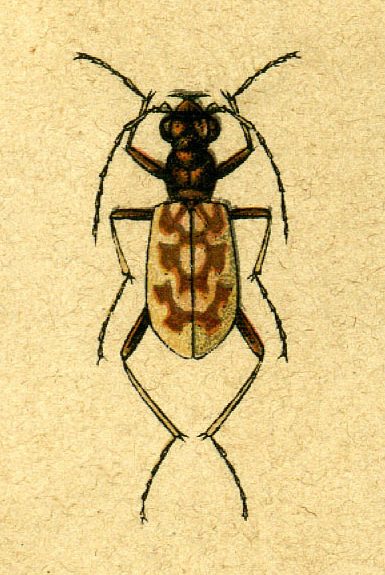

Scientific classification
- Kingdom: Animalia
- Phylum: Arthropoda
- Class: Insecta
- Order: Coleoptera
- Suborder: Adephaga
- Family: Cicindelidae
- Genus: Chaetodera
- Species: C. laetescripta

Binomial name
- Chaetodera laetescripta (Motschulsky, 1860)

Synonyms
- Cicindela laetescripta Motschulsky, 1860; Cicindela circumpictula W.Horn, 1938; Cicindela kiushuensis Mandl, 1981; Cicindela semenowi Dokhtouroff, 1887

= Chaetodera laetescripta =

Species of beetle

Chaetodera laetescripta is a species of tiger beetle. This species is found in China, South Korea, Japan, Russia and Mongolia.

Adults exhibit variation in elytral colour pattern, to match the colour of the sand in their habitat.

== Subspecies ==
- Chaetodera laetescripta laetescripta (China, South Korea, Japan, Russia, Mongolia)
- Chaetodera laetescripta circumpictula (W.Horn, 1938) (Japan)
- Chaetodera laetescripta kiushuensis (Mandl, 1981) (Japan)
