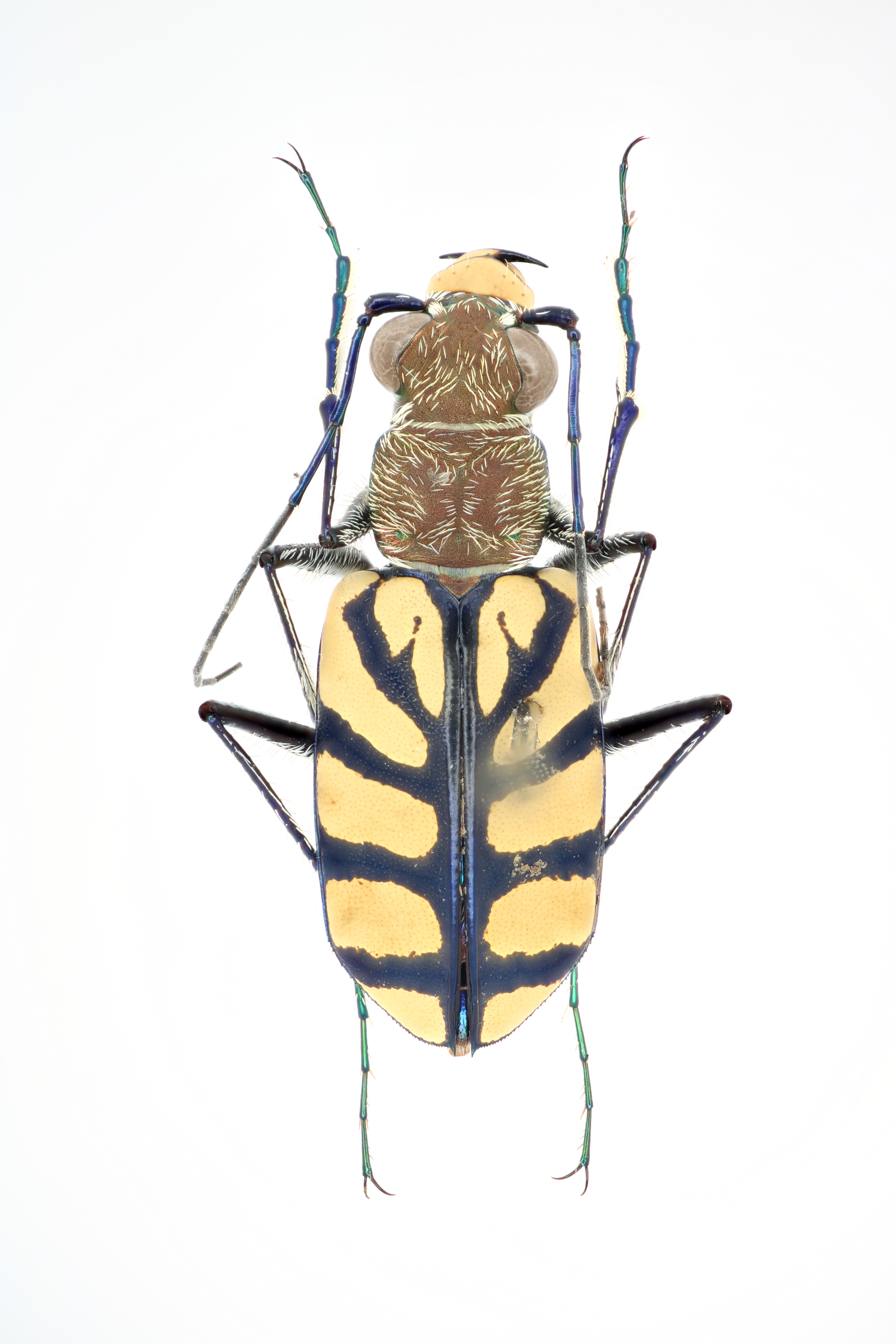
- C. regalis specimen from Zambia

Scientific classification
- Kingdom: Animalia
- Phylum: Arthropoda
- Class: Insecta
- Order: Coleoptera
- Suborder: Adephaga
- Family: Cicindelidae
- Tribe: Cicindelini
- Subtribe: Cicindelina
- Genus: Chaetodera; Jeannel, 1946

Synonyms
- Pseudochaetodera Pajni & Bedi, 1974; Rivaliera Pajni & Bedi, 1974; Tribonophora Rivalier, 1950

= Chaetodera =

Genus of beetles

Chaetodera is a genus in the beetle family Cicindelidae. There are about seven described species in Chaetodera.

== Species ==
These seven species belong to the genus Chaetodera:

- Chaetodera albina (Wiedemann, 1819) — Pakistan, Nepal, and India
- Chaetodera andriana (Alluaud, 1900) — Madagascar
- Chaetodera blanchardi (Fairmaire, 1882) — Somalia and Kenya
- Chaetodera laetescripta (Motschulsky, 1860) — Asia
- Chaetodera maheva (Künckel d'Herculais, 1887) — Madagascar
- Chaetodera regalis (Dejean, 1831) — Africa
- Chaetodera vigintiguttata (Herbst, 1806) — Pakistan, Nepal, Bhutan, Bangladesh, India
