= Chaetodera andriana =

Scientific classification
- Kingdom: Animalia
- Phylum: Arthropoda
- Class: Insecta
- Order: Coleoptera
- Suborder: Adephaga
- Family: Cicindelidae
- Genus: Chaetodera
- Species: C. andriana

Binomial name
- Chaetodera andriana (Alluaud, 1900)

Synonyms
- Cicindela andriana Alluaud, 1900

Species of beetle

Chaetodera andriana is a species of tiger beetle.

== Distribution ==
This species is found in Madagascar.
