= Oxycrepis intercepta =

Scientific classification
- Domain: Eukaryota
- Kingdom: Animalia
- Phylum: Arthropoda
- Class: Insecta
- Order: Coleoptera
- Suborder: Adephaga
- Family: Carabidae
- Subfamily: Pterostichinae
- Tribe: Pterostichini
- Genus: Oxycrepis
- Species: O. intercepta

Binomial name
- Oxycrepis intercepta (Chaudoir, 1874)

Synonyms
- Oxycrepis interceptus

Species of beetle

Oxycrepis intercepta is a species of ground beetle in the family Carabidae. It is found in North America, Mexico, and the United States.
