= Jean-Baptiste Eugène Bellier de la Chavignerie =

French entomologist (1819–1888)

Eugène Bellier de la Chavignerie
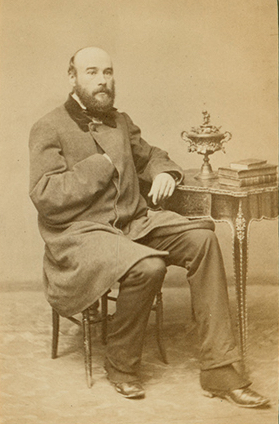
- Born: 28 January 1819; Chartres, France
- Died: 25 September 1888 (aged 69); Évreux, France
- Relatives: Émile Bellier de la Chavignerie
- Scientific career
- Fields: Entomology; lepidoptera, coleoptera
- Workplaces: Société entomologique de France

Eugène Bellier de la Chavignerie (28 January 1819, Chartres – 25 September 1888, Évreux) was a French entomologist who specialised in lepidoptera and coleoptera.

== Biography ==
Eugène was born in Chartres in 1819, the son of François Jean-Baptiste de La Chavignerie and Francine Marchand. A student at the Lycée Louis-le-Grand in Paris, he was initiated into entomology by his maternal grandfather, Jean-Jacques Marchand (1770–1852), who had an astonishing collection of lepidoptera while having been one of the founding members of the Société entomologique de France in 1832 and a correspondent of the Société linnéenne de Paris.

After his studies in Chartres and Paris, he worked at the Palais de Justice from 1844 to 1859. He devoted himself mainly to lepidoptera and wrote many scientific papers on them, in particular on local faunas such as those of Auvergne (1850), the Alps (from 1854 to 1858), the Pyrénées-Orientales (1858), Sicily (1860) and Corsica (1861). After his death, the entomologist Charles Oberthür (1845–1924) acquired his collection of lepidoptera, while his brother René Oberthür (1852–1944) bought his coleoptera.

== Select publications ==
- 1849. Observations on Lepidoptera of Auvergne, in Annales de la Société entomologique de France, 2nd series, 8: 73–81.
- 1850. Observations on Lepidoptera of Auvergne, in Annales Scientifique, Littéraires et Industriels de l'Auvergne, 23: 283–293.
- 1851. Observations on the Lepidoptera of Lozère, in Annals of the Entomological Society of France, 2nd series, 1: 681–695.
- 1856. Observation on the Lepidoptera of the Basses-Alpes, in Annals of the Entomological Society of France, 3rd series, 4: 4–26.

== Sources ==
- Jean Lhoste (1987). Les Entomologistes français. 1750–1950. INRA Éditions: p. 351.
