= Oxycrepis sculptilis =

Scientific classification
- Domain: Eukaryota
- Kingdom: Animalia
- Phylum: Arthropoda
- Class: Insecta
- Order: Coleoptera
- Suborder: Adephaga
- Family: Carabidae
- Genus: Oxycrepis
- Species: O. sculptilis

Binomial name
- Oxycrepis sculptilis Bates, 1884

Species of beetle

Oxycrepis sculptilis is a species of ground beetle in the family Carabidae. It is found in North America.
