= Yves Gomy =

French physician and entomologist

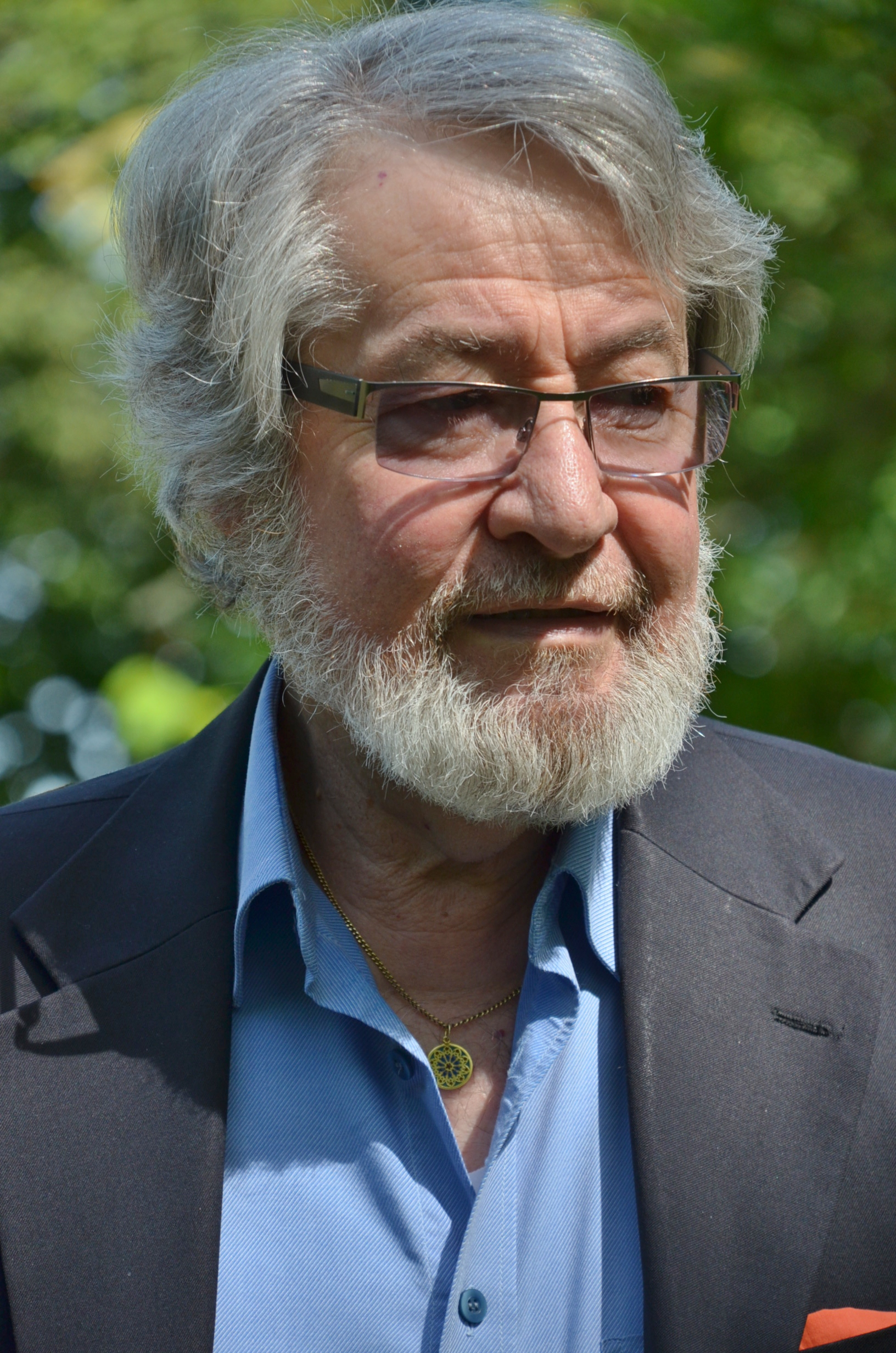
- Professor Yves Gomy in 2014
- Born: 2 July 1942 (age 84); Paris
- Education: School of Pharmacy, Paris
- Occupations: Entomologist, poet
- Organization: Société Entomologique de France
- Known for: Work on Histeridae
- Spouse: Colette Cordou (1962)
- Children: Yves (1963-2025), Alexandre (1975).

Yves Gomy (2 July 1942 in Paris), is a French entomologist and poet, best known as a specialist in Histeridae beetles. In his later years, he developed the Buddhist concept of conditioned co-production—whereby all things interact and depend on one another for their existence (interdependence and emptiness, or Śūnyatā, symbolized by the Ensō)—finding in it both a confirmation of his research into entomological biodiversity and an impetus to understand and protect natural environments (biotopes). He works with various organizations dedicated to environmental study and conservation.; Among other works, he has published five collections of poetry inspired primarily by his time in the islands of the western Indian Ocean (the Mascarene Islands, Madagascar, and the Comoros).

== Poems ==
- Chrysalide, Art et Poésie, 1974
- Le Cri, Maison Rhodanienne de Poésie, 1978
- Des Mots Dés, cum « L'Échelle sans barreaux ou l'Essentiel avec un grand A » Colettae Cordou Gomy. Edizioni Maison Rhodanienne de Poésie, 1986
- La Déchirure, Maison Rhodanienne de Poésie, 1986
- Solstice d'hiver, Aquiprint, 2020

== Honors and awards ==
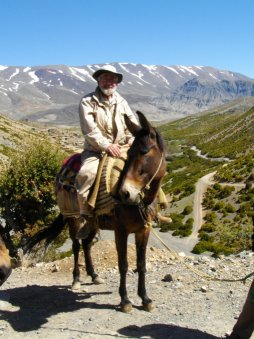
Yves Gomy in May 2009 during an expedition to Tamjilt, in the Middle Atlas.

- Émile-Biliotti Prize, 27 June 1987, Office pour les insectes et leur environnement (OPIE), with Colette Cordou Gomy.
- Knight of Ordre des Palmes académiques, Bordeaux, 21 February 2001
- President of Société entomologique de France (SEF) from 2006 to 2007.
- Officer of Ordre des Palmes académiques, 8 January 2014
- Prize for the 2017 scientific book at the 19th International Insular Book Fair of the island of Ouessant for the work Les Coléoptères de l'île de La Réunion, Orphie Editions, 2016.
- Henri-Gadeau-de-Kerville Prize of the Société entomologique de France (SEF) 2017 for the work Les Coléoptères de l'île de La Réunion"
- ACOREP-France Guy Colas Award 2018 for Les Coccinelles de La Réunion (Editions Orphie, 2018).
- Maurice et Thérèse Pic Prize of the Société entomologique de France (SEF) 2018 for Les Coccinelles de La Réunion (Editions Orphie, 2018).
- Henri-Gadeau-de-Kerville Prize of the Société entomologique de France (SEF) 2022 for Les Histeridae du Maroc (Editions Magellanes).
- Meritorious member of the Société entomologique de France (SEF) during the General Assembly of 18 December 2025.
