= Jean Étienne Bercé =

French entomologist (1803–1879)

Jean-Etienne Bercé (24 April 1803 – 29 December 1879) was a French entomologist specialising in Lepidoptera. He wrote Faune Entomologique Française. Lépidoptères. Description de tous les Papillons qui se trouvent en France Paris, Chez Deyrolle Fils, 1867–1878.

This is an eight-volume work with 72 plates, 67 coloured by hand. It is divided:

- Vol. I : Rhopalocères, 251 pp., planche A et planches 1-18
- Vol. II : Hétérocères, 270 pp., planche B et planches 19-33
- Vol. III : Hétérocères Noctuae, Première partie, 256 pp., planche C et planches 34-38
- Vol. IV : Hétérocères Noctuae, Deuxième partie, 262 pp. et planches 39-46
- Vol. V : Hétérocères Géometridae, 512 pp., planche D et planches 47-58
- Vol. VI : Hétérocères Deltoides, Pyralites, 398 pp., planche E et planches 1-9
- Vol VII : Catalogue Méthodique, 37 pp.

He was elected president of the Société entomologique de France for the year 1868.
