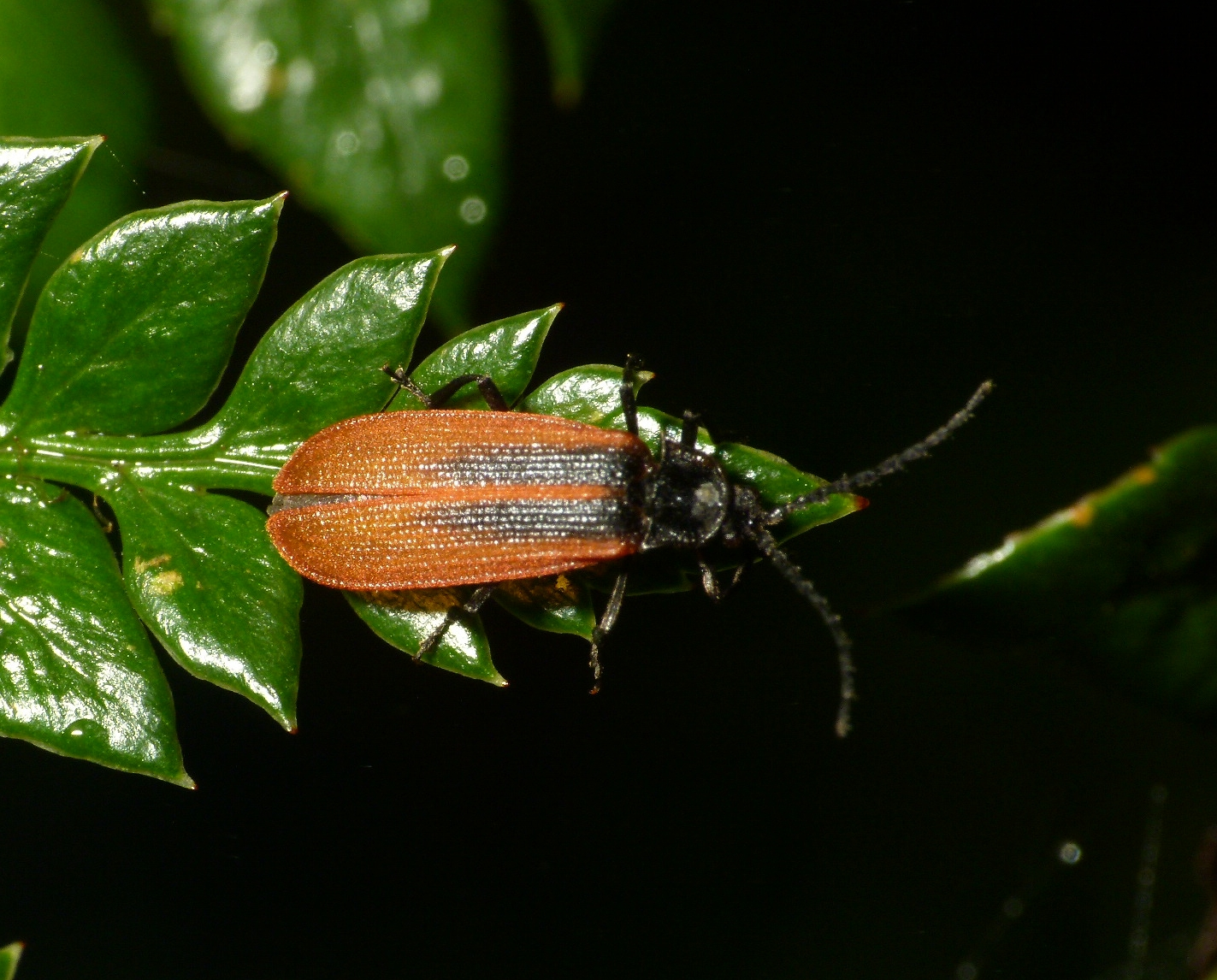
- A unknown Plateros species located in the Himalayas
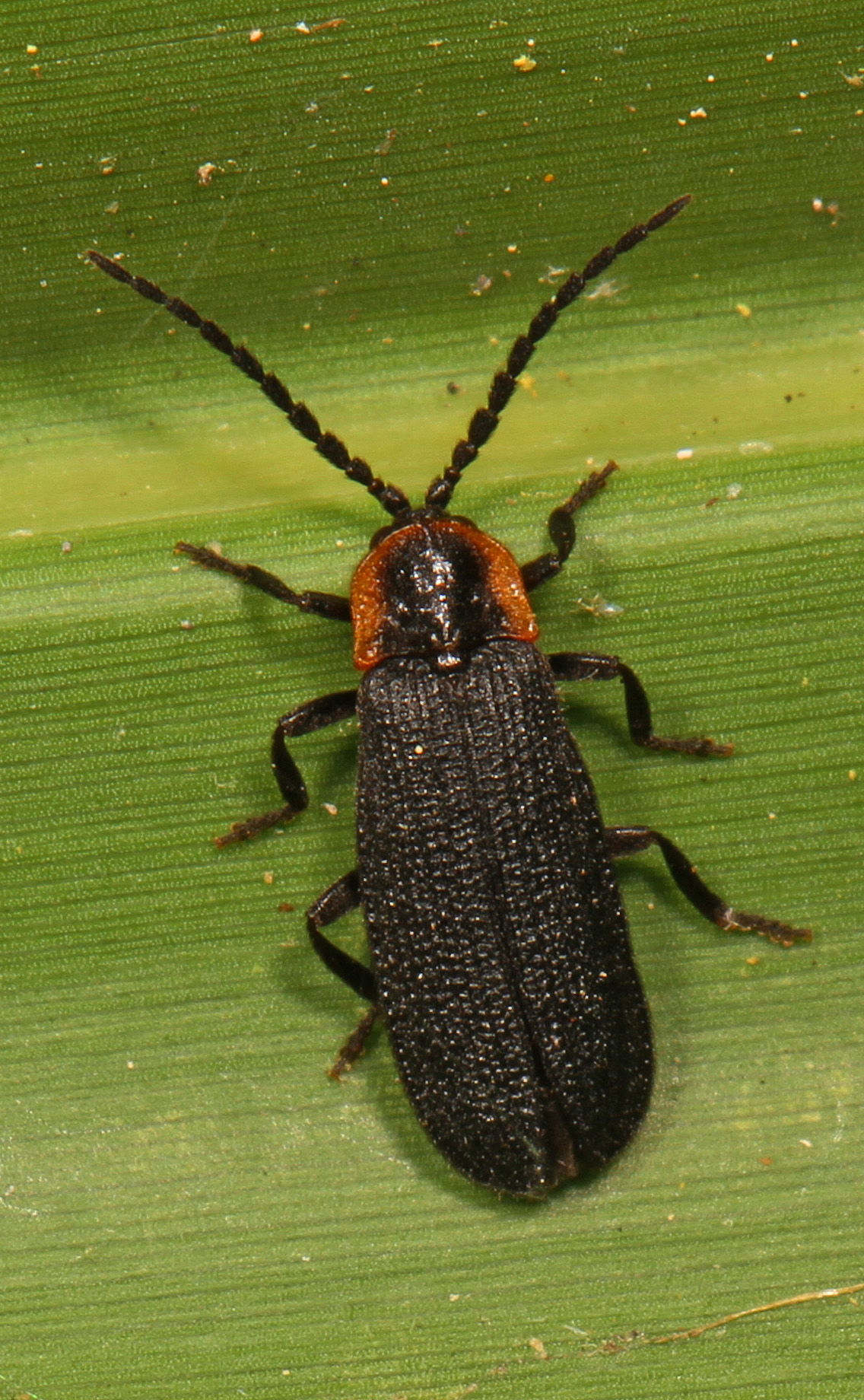
- Unknown Plateros species from Sapelo Island, Georgia

Scientific classification
- Kingdom: Animalia
- Phylum: Arthropoda
- Clade: Pancrustacea
- Class: Insecta
- Order: Coleoptera
- Suborder: Polyphaga
- Infraorder: Elateriformia
- Family: Lycidae
- Subfamily: Lycinae
- Tribe: Platerodini
- Genus: Plateros; Bourgeois, 1879

Diversity
- 47 species

Synonyms
- Planeteros Gorham, 1883

= Plateros =

Genus of beetles

Plateros is a genus of net-winged beetles that belongs to the tribe Platerodini.

== Distribution ==
Members of this genus have a wide distribution being found in the Americas, Africa and Asia, including Sri Lanka, Indochina, Korea and Japan.

== Taxonomy ==
=== Species ===
This genus currently contains 47 described species. This makes this genus the largest of its family. A list can be found below:

1. Plateros arizonensis Green, 1953
2. Plateros australis Green, 1953
3. Plateros avians Green, 1953
4. Plateros batillifer Green, 1953
5. Plateros bidens Green, 1953
6. Plateros bispiculatus Green, 1953
7. Plateros borealis Green, 1953
8. Plateros capillaris Green, 1953
9. Plateros capitatus Green, 1953
10. Plateros carinulatus Green, 1953
11. Plateros centralis Green, 1953
12. Plateros coccinicollis Fall, 1910
13. Plateros dentaticornis Wang, Chengtao & Yang, Yuxia & Fang, Chen & Yang, Xingke & Liu, Haoyu. (2026)
14. Plateros devians Green, 1953
15. Plateros elongatus Wang, Chengtao & Yang, Yuxia & Fang, Chen & Yang, Xingke & Liu, Haoyu. (2026)
16. Plateros flavoscutellatus Blatchley, 1914
17. Plateros floralis (Melsheimer, 1845)
18. Plateros hainanensis Wang, Chengtao & Yang, Yuxia & Fang, Chen & Yang, Xingke & Liu, Haoyu. (2026)
19. Plateros kalamensis Tvardik & Bocak, 2001
20. Plateros knulli Green, 1953
21. Plateros krivolutzkii L. Medvedev
22. Plateros kurentzovi L. Medvedev
23. Plateros lalui Tvardik & Bocak, 2001
24. Plateros lictor (Newman, 1838)
25. Plateros mamasensis Tvardik & Bocak, 2001
26. Plateros milenae Tvardik & Bocak, 2001
27. Plateros modestus (Say, 1835)
28. Plateros nigerrimus Schaeffer, 1908
29. Plateros nigrior Green, 1953
30. Plateros ocularis Green, 1953
31. Plateros orobuensis Tvardik & Bocak, 2001
32. Plateros perditus Green, 1953
33. Plateros peregrinus Green, 1953
34. Plateros roseimargo Fall, 1910
35. Plateros rubromamasensis Tvardik & Bocak, 2001
36. Plateros sanguinicollis Horn, 1894
37. Plateros sinuatus Wang, Chengtao & Yang, Yuxia & Fang, Chen & Yang, Xingke & Liu, Haoyu. (2026)
38. Plateros sollicitus (LeConte, 1847)
39. Plateros spinulosus Wang, Chengtao & Yang, Yuxia & Fang, Chen & Yang, Xingke & Liu, Haoyu. (2026)
40. Plateros subfurcatus Green, 1953
41. Plateros subtortus Green, 1953
42. Plateros tanatorajensis Tvardik & Bocak, 2001
43. Plateros timidus (LeConte, 1847)
44. Plateros transpictus Green, 1953
45. Plateros tumacacori Green, 1953
46. Plateros ussuriensis Barovskij
47. Plateros volatus Green, 1953
