= Gaston Ruter =

French entomologist

Gaston Ruter (2 November 1898 – 2 November 1979) was a French entomologist. He studied the Coleoptera Cetoniidae.

== Life ==
A short notice was published by Paulian & Decarpentries.

As an entomologist, he was always interested in the Coleoptera fauna of France, of which he had a large collection, especially microcoleoptera, for which he accurately prepared the tiny genitalia.

He first studied the Curculionidae of the genus Bagous. Then, with the help of Bourgoin, his research became focused on the study of exotic Cetonids.

His collection is housed at the National Museum of Natural History in Paris.

== Works ==
The list of his publications was given later by Menier.

There is one work missing.

He published relatively little compared to all of his discoveries. A number of taxa remained in litteris.

== Reward ==
He was elected president of the Société entomologique de France in 1956.

== Entomological terms named after him ==
- Acalles ruteri Roudier, 1954
- Agrilus ruteri Descarpentries & Villiers, 1963
- Alleucosma ruteri Antoine, 1989
- Amaurina ruteri Antoine, 2000
- Ancyrophorus ruteri Jarrige 1949
- Aphelorhina neumanni ruteri Allard, 1986
- Arachnodes ruteri Lebis, 1953
- Astenus ruteri Lecoq, 1996
- Athous ruteri Chassain, 1985
- Bothrorrhina ruteri Lisle, 1953
- Calais ruteri Girard 1968
- Clinteria ducalis ruteri Paulian 1960
- Coelocorynus ruteri Antoine, 2003
- Coelorrhina ruteri De Lisle, 1953
- Coenochilus ruteri Schein, 1954
- Colpodes ruteri Morvan, 1972
- Cyprolais ruteri Lisle, 1953
- Dinosius ruteri Ferragu 1986
- Entomoderus ruteri Roudier, 1954
- Euselates rufipes ruteri Miksic, 1971
- Goliathus ruteri Endrodi, 1960
- Haematonotus ruteri Basilewsky, 1956
- Heteroderes ruteri Chassain, 1978
- Hoplopyga ruteri Antoine 2008
- Ischiopsopha ruteri Allard, 1995
- Laparocerus ruteri Roudier, 1957
- Leucocelis ruteri Antoine, 2000
- Mausoleopsis amabilis ruteri Antoine, 1989
- Mycterophallus ruteri Alexis & Delpont, 2000
- Ochthephilus ruteri Jarrige, 1949
- Oedichirus ruteri Lecoq, 1986
- Pachnoda aemula ruteri Villiers, 1950
- Peritelus ruteri Péricart, 1963
- Plaesiorrhina ruteri Lisle, 1953
- Porphyronota ruteri Gomes Alves, 1973
- Proictes ruteri Ferragu 1978
- Protaetia ruteri Paulian, 1959
- Pseudalleucosma ruteri Antoine, 1998
- Pseudomeira ruteri Roudier, 1954
- Rhinocoeta ruteri Basilewsky, 1956
- Ruteria Jarrige, 1957
- Scheinia ruteri Krikken, 1977
- Stenotarsia ruteri Paulian, 1991
- Stephanorrhina neumanni ruteri Allard, 1986
- Tafaia ruteri Arnaud, 1982
- Tephraea ruteri Basilewsky 1956
- Trechus grenieri ruteri Colas & A. Gaudin, 1935
- Urodon rufipes ruteri Hoffmann, 1950
- Xestagonum ruteri Morvan, 1972
