= Chaetodera albina =

Scientific classification
- Domain: Eukaryota
- Kingdom: Animalia
- Phylum: Arthropoda
- Class: Insecta
- Order: Coleoptera
- Suborder: Adephaga
- Family: Cicindelidae
- Genus: Chaetodera
- Species: C. albina

Binomial name
- Chaetodera albina (Wiedemann, 1819)

Synonyms
- Cicindela albina Wiedemann, 1819; Cicindela albida Dejean, 1825

Species of beetle

Chaetodera albina, the white sand tiger beetle, is a species of tiger beetle. This species is found in Pakistan, Nepal and India. Its habitat consists of dry sandy soil close to water.
