= Émile Bellier de la Chavignerie =

French art historian and journalist (1821–1871)

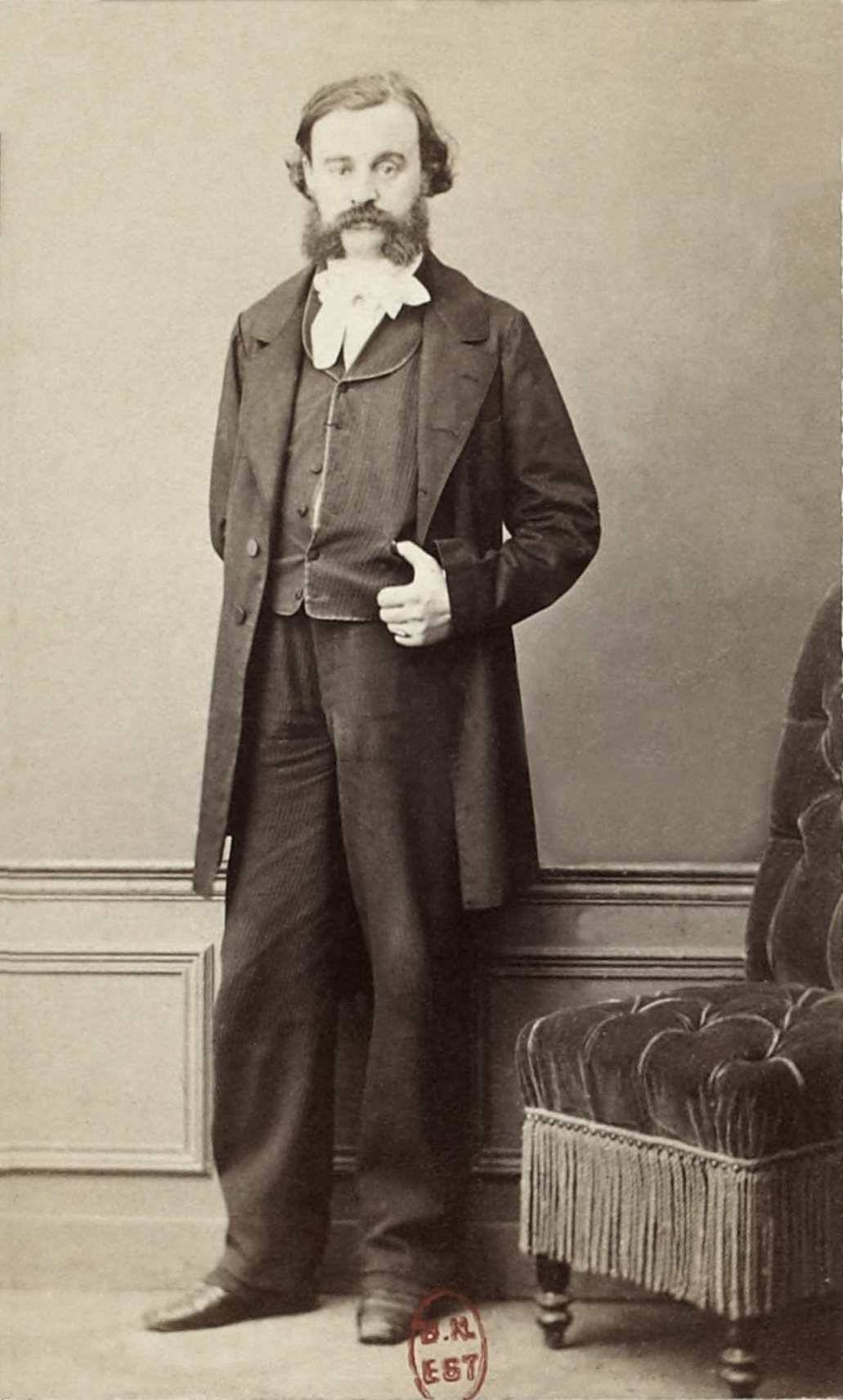
- Émile in 1860, aged 38
- Born: 6 December 1821; Chartres, France
- Died: 6 February 1871 (aged 49); Saint-Malo, France
- Occupations: Art historian, journalist
- Relatives: Jean-Baptiste Eugène Bellier de la Chavignerie (1819–1888); François-Philippe Bellier de la Chavignerie (1828–1906)

Émile Bellier de la Chavignerie (6 December 1821, Chartres – 6 February 1871, Saint-Malo) was a French art historian.

== Life ==
Émile Bellier de la Chavigneria was born into a bourgeois family in Chartres. He was the son of François Jean Baptiste Bellier de la Chavignerie, vice-president of the civil court of Chartres, and Francine Marchand. His elder brother, Jean-Baptiste Eugène Bellier de la Chavignerie, was an entomologist. His younger brother, François-Philippe Bellier de la Chavignerie (1828–1906), was a magistrate and deputy mayor of Chartres.

Chavignerie began his career in the administration of Registration and Domains, where he worked eleven years before entering, in 1854, the Bibliothèque impériale, where he took a very active part in the catalogue of printed matter. Having become an honorary employee in 1862, he became a sub-inspector at the official exhibitions of fine arts, of which he wrote the catalogues from 1864.

His first notable writings were concerned with history and archaeology, more particularly with regard to his native province, the Pays Chartrain, and he elucidated various obscure points concerning the annals of this region. But his favourite studies focused mainly on French art and artists. He had brought to light the first nine issues of the General Dictionary of Artists of the French School, the fruit of long and learned research which would have been the capital work of his life, when the Franco-Prussian War broke out in 1870. Exempted by his age from war service, he sought to devote himself elsewhere and followed the Geneva Red Cross ambulance to Brittany. Not content to heal the wounded, he did not shrink from the care to be given, most dangerously, to those afflicted with smallpox, and succumbed, in his turn, to the contagion.

He had also collaborated with the Revue des Beaux-Arts, the Archives de l'Art français, the Revue Universelle des Arts, and the Bulletin du Bouquiniste. Since 1862, he was responsible for the obituaries in the Chronique des arts et de la curiosité. He contributed to the Biographie Universelle of Michaud, revising or drafting all the articles on French artists, from the article on Murals (Mirual) until the end of the book. He also wrote weekly letters under the pseudonym of "un Flâneur" (from 4 December 1862 to 1 October 1863), Lettres d'un Flâneur parisien, à la feuille de Tournai.

Louis Auvray continued to publish Émile's Dictionary of Artists of the French School posthumously. The work appeared in two volumes, in 1882 and 1885.

== Bibliography ==
Gustave Chaix d'Est-Ange (ed.). "Bellier de La Chavignerie", Dictionnaire des familles françaises anciennes ou notables à la fin du xixe siècle, tome 3 (Paris, 1904), pp. 295–6.
