= Auguste Eugène Méquignon =

French entomologist

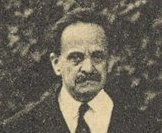
A. Méquignon at the International Congress of Entomology in Madrid, 1935

Auguste Eugène Méquignon (21 February 1875, in Paris – 1958 in Paris), was a French entomologist. He specialised in Coleoptera, especially Staphyliniformia and Cucujoidea.

He was a member of the Société entomologique de France and was president in 1922.

== Works ==
partial list

- Many short papers (notes diverses) in Bulletin de la Société Entomologique de France and Miscellanea Entomologica
- 1938 with Jean Sainte-Claire Deville Catalogue raisonné des coléoptères de France Société entomologique de France, 1938 - 474 pages
- 1942 Voyage de MM. L. Chopard et A. Méquignon aux Açores (août-septembre 1930). XIII. Diagnoses de Coléoptères nouveaux. Bulletin de la Société Entomologique de France 47: 9–11.
- 1942 Voyage de MM. L. Chopard et A. Méquignon aux Açores (Aout-Septembre 1930). XIV. Catalogues des Coléoptères Açoréens. Annales de la Société Entomologique de France 111: 1–66.
- 1943 Notes diverses sur des Coléoptères de France. Bulletin de la Société Entomologique de France 48(11): 159–162.
