= Maurice Jean Auguste Girard =

French entomologist

Maurice Jean Auguste Girard (13 September 1822 – 8 September 1886) was a French entomologist.

Girard was born in Givet, Ardennes, and entered École normale supérieure in 1844. In 1847 he taught physics in Périgueux. After having obtained his agrégation, he left for Dijon where he taught from 1853 to 1873. during this time he obtained his “licence” and his “doctorat ès-sciences naturelles” with a thesis entitled Étude sur la chaleur libre dégagée par les animaux invertébrés et spécialement les insectes.

He edited L'Insectologie agricole, journal traitant des insectes utiles... et des insectes nuisibles... from 1867 to 1870. He wrote more than 200 publications on insects and a book on François Péron- François Péron, naturaliste voyageur aux australes (1800-1804) (J.-B. Baillière, Paris, 1856)

He was president of Société entomologique de France in 1867. He died at Lion-sur-Mer, aged 63.

- Les Métamorphoses des insectes (Hachette, Paris, 1866, réédité en 1879).
- Catalogue raisonné des animaux utiles et nuisibles de la France. I. Animaux utiles, leurs services et leur conservation; II. Animaux nuisibles, dégâts qu'ils produisent, moyens de les détruire (Hachette, 1874, réédité en 1878 et en 1879).
- Histoire naturelle. Zoologie (C. Delagrave, Paris, deux volumes, 1883-1887).
- Le Phylloxéra de la vigne, son organisation, ses mœurs, choix des procédés de destruction (Hachette, Paris, 1878, réédité en 1880 et en 1883).
- Les Abeilles, organes et fonctions, éducation et produits, miel et cire (J.-B. Baillière et fils, Paris, réédité en 1887 et en 1890).

Source Jean Lhoste (1987). Les Entomologistes français. 1750-1950. INRA Éditions : 351 p. Translation from French Wikipedia
