= Chaetodera vigintiguttata =

Scientific classification
- Kingdom: Animalia
- Phylum: Arthropoda
- Class: Insecta
- Order: Coleoptera
- Suborder: Adephaga
- Family: Cicindelidae
- Genus: Chaetodera
- Species: C. vigintiguttata

Binomial name
- Chaetodera vigintiguttata (Herbst, 1806)

Synonyms
- Cicindela vigintiguttata Herbst, 1806

Species of beetle

Chaetodera vigintiguttata is a species of tiger beetle. This species is found in Pakistan, Nepal, Bhutan, Bangladesh and India (Punjab, Uttar Pradesh, Haryana, Bihar, western Bengal, Assam, Sikkim, Orissa).
