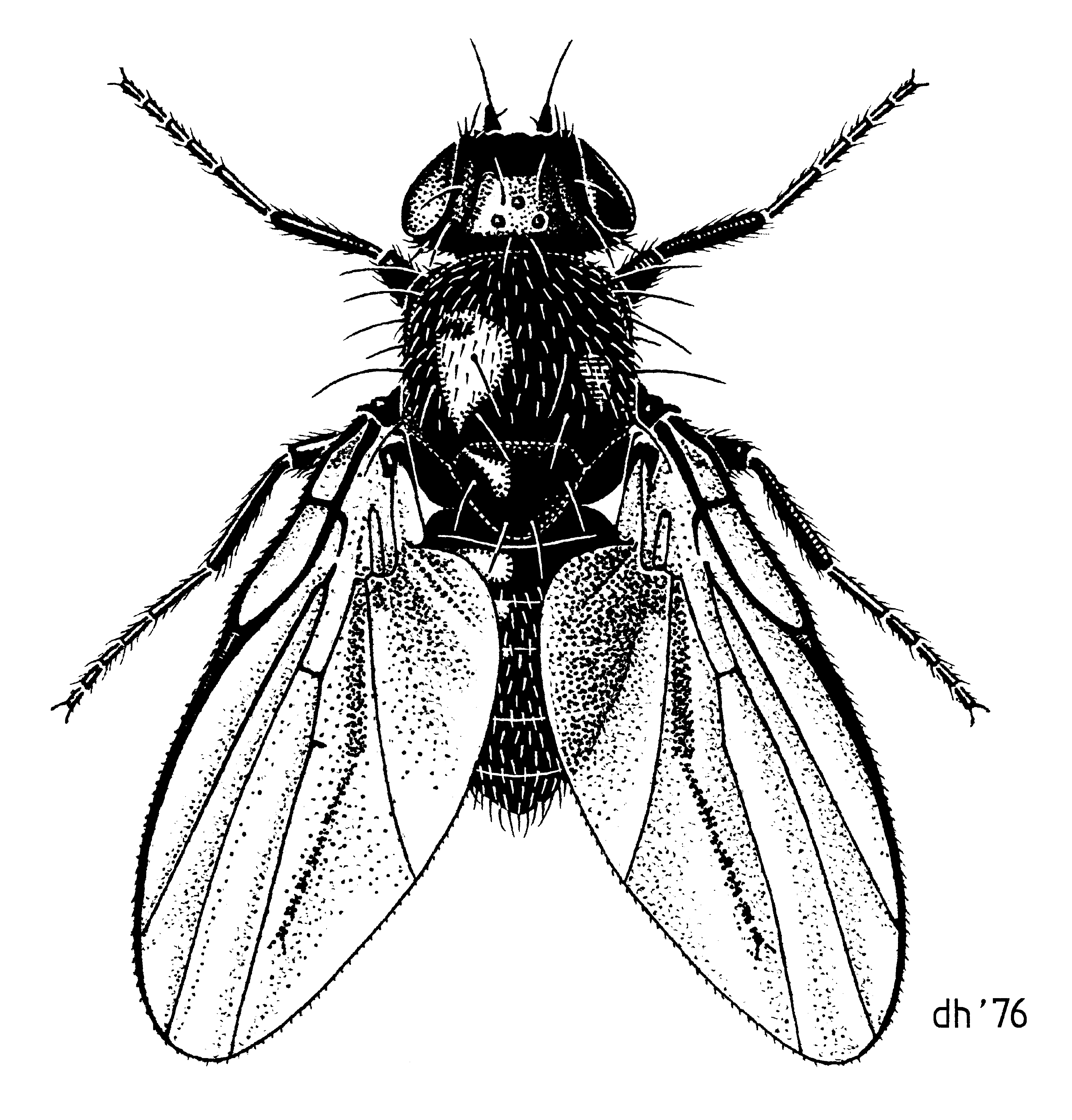
- Euhexomyza coprosmae by Des Helmore

Scientific classification
- Kingdom: Animalia
- Phylum: Arthropoda
- Class: Insecta
- Order: Diptera
- Family: Agromyzidae
- Subfamily: Agromyzinae
- Genus: Euhexomyza; Lonsdale, 2014

Synonyms
- Hexomyza Enderlein, 1936; Hexomyza Enderlein, 1936; Triopisopa Enderlein, 1936

= Euhexomyza =

Genus of flies

Euhexomyza is a genus of flies belonging to the family Agromyzidae.

== Species ==
- Euhexomyza albicula (Spencer, 1969)
- Euhexomyza coprosmae (Spencer, 1976)
- Euhexomyza salicis (Malloch, 1913)
- Euhexomyza schineri (Giraud, 1862)
- Euhexomyza simplicoides (Hendel, 1920)
- Euhexomyza websteri (Malloch, 1913)
- Euhexomyza winnemanae (Malloch, 1913)
