= Euhexomyza simplicoides =

Scientific classification
- Kingdom: Animalia
- Phylum: Arthropoda
- Class: Insecta
- Order: Diptera
- Family: Agromyzidae
- Genus: Euhexomyza
- Species: E. simplicoides

Binomial name
- Euhexomyza simplicoides (Hendel, 1920)

Synonyms
- Melanagromyza simplicoides Hendel, 1920; Melanagromyza kirgizica Rohdendorf-Holmanova, 1959

Species of fly

Euhexomyza simplicoides is a species of fly in the family Agromyzidae and forms woody galls on many species of willow.

== Description ==
The woody gall is a spindle-shaped swelling tapering into the stem. It is about 2 cm long and at its widest 0.5 cm, but can be indistinct, with the stem barely swollen. Several galls may form around the stem. During the summer there is one white larva in a spherical chamber, which pupates and overwinters in the gall. The puparium is yellowish, with bright reddish brown front segments.

Goat willow (S. caprea) is considered to be the main host but has been recorded from many species of sallow including S. alba, S. triandra and S. viminalis and on the hybrids between them. Also recorded on S. aurita, S. cinerea, S. cinerea subsp. oleifolia, S. pedicellata and S. repens

== Distribution ==
Recorded from United States, Austria, Belgium, Finland, France, Germany, Hungary, Italy, Kyrgyzstan, Lithuania, Netherlands, Poland, Spain and Switzerland.

== Parasitoids ==
- Sphegigaster glabrata Graham, 1969 — a parasitoid wasp.
