= Oxycrepis rectangula =

Scientific classification
- Kingdom: Animalia
- Phylum: Arthropoda
- Class: Insecta
- Order: Coleoptera
- Suborder: Adephaga
- Family: Carabidae
- Subfamily: Pterostichinae
- Tribe: Pterostichini
- Genus: Oxycrepis
- Species: O. rectangula

Binomial name
- Oxycrepis rectangula (LeConte, 1878)

Species of beetle

Oxycrepis rectangula is a species of ground beetle in the family Carabidae. It is found in the United States.
