= Oxycrepis erratica =

Scientific classification
- Kingdom: Animalia
- Phylum: Arthropoda
- Class: Insecta
- Order: Coleoptera
- Suborder: Adephaga
- Family: Carabidae
- Subfamily: Pterostichinae
- Tribe: Pterostichini
- Genus: Oxycrepis
- Species: O. erratica

Binomial name
- Oxycrepis erratica (Dejean, 1828)

Synonyms
- Oxycrepis erraticus

Species of beetle

Oxycrepis erratica is a species of ground beetle in the family Carabidae. It is found in the United States.
