= Chaetodera blanchardi =

Scientific classification
- Kingdom: Animalia
- Phylum: Arthropoda
- Class: Insecta
- Order: Coleoptera
- Suborder: Adephaga
- Family: Cicindelidae
- Genus: Chaetodera
- Species: C. blanchardi

Binomial name
- Chaetodera blanchardi (Fairmaire, 1882)

Synonyms
- Cicindela blanchardi Fairmaire, 1882

Species of beetle

Chaetodera blanchardi is a species of tiger beetle. This species is found in Somalia and Kenya.

Adults reach a length of 12-14 mm. This species can be distinguished from other Chaetodera species by elytral colour pattern, as well as black spots on the elytral disc.
