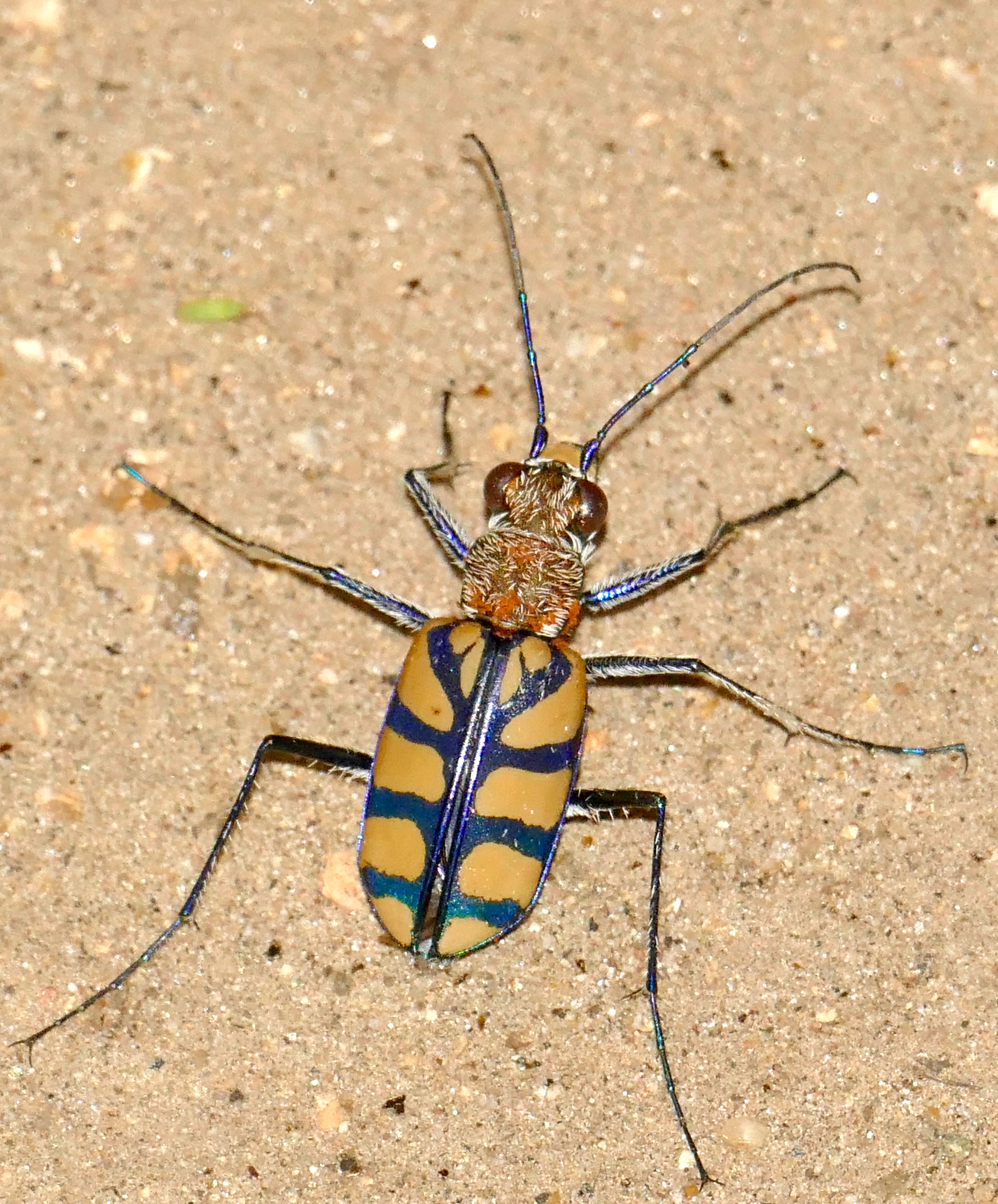

Scientific classification
- Kingdom: Animalia
- Phylum: Arthropoda
- Class: Insecta
- Order: Coleoptera
- Suborder: Adephaga
- Family: Cicindelidae
- Genus: Chaetodera
- Species: C. regalis

Binomial name
- Chaetodera regalis (Dejean, 1831)

Subspecies
- Chaetodera regalis regalis; Chaetodera regalis venerada

Synonyms
- Cicindela regalis (basionym); Cicindela bremeri Mandl, 1982

= Chaetodera regalis =

Royal tiger beetle

Species of insect

Chaetodera regalis, common name the royal tiger beetle (which may also refer to Lophyra clathrata), is a species of tiger beetle found in Sub-Saharan Africa, especially in the south-east. It is found in riverine habitats.

== Subspecies ==
- Chaetodera regalis regalis (Senegal/Gambia, Guinea, Togo, Benin, Nigeria, Chad, Central African Republic, Sudan, Eritrea, Somalia, Congo, DR Congo, Kenya, Rwanda, Burundi, Tanzania, Zambia, Malawi, Mozambique, Zimbabwe, Namibia, South Africa)
- Chaetodera regalis veneranda Rivalier, 1952 (Niger, Chad, Sudan)
