= Oxycrepis duryi =

Scientific classification
- Domain: Eukaryota
- Kingdom: Animalia
- Phylum: Arthropoda
- Class: Insecta
- Order: Coleoptera
- Suborder: Adephaga
- Family: Carabidae
- Genus: Oxycrepis
- Species: O. duryi

Binomial name
- Oxycrepis duryi Wright, 1939

Species of beetle

Oxycrepis duryi is a species of ground beetle in the family Carabidae. It is found in North America.
