= Henri Bertrand (entomologist) =

French entomologist (1892–1978)

Henri Bertrand (19 January, 1892 – 1 September, 1978) was a French entomologist.

Bertrand obtained the qualification licence de sciences naturelles at the University of Bordeaux in 1912 then a certificat d'histologie in 1920 from the University of Paris and a doctorate in sciences in 1927. In 1936, he worked at the marine biology station in Dinard where he specialised in crustaceans. In 1944, he worked as a research director at the French National Centre for Scientific Research (CNRS) then at l'École pratique des hautes études. He received many prizes for his research (Prix Passet, Prix Gadeau de Kerville) and was a member of many scientific societies. He was President of the Société entomologique de France in 1961. He studied in particular the larvae of water beetles. He published more than 200 notes on flies, mayflies and caddisflies. In 1978 he disappeared in the Pyrenees; his corpse was discovered the following year.

In 1918 Bertrand published Larves et Nymphes des Dysticides Hygrobiides et Haliplides; then in 1954 a two-volume work Insectes aquatiques d'Europe and in 1972 his last work, 804 pages on the Larves et Nymphes des coléoptères aquatiques du globe.

== Works ==
- Bertrand, Henri (December 1975). "Les larves et les nymphes des Coléoptères aquatiques". SIL Proceedings, 1922-2010 (in French). 19 (4): 3168–3173. doi:10.1080/03680770.1974.11896428.
