= Sphenomorphus maindroni =

Conservation status
- Least Concern (IUCN 3.1)

Scientific classification
- Kingdom: Animalia
- Phylum: Chordata
- Class: Reptilia
- Order: Squamata
- Family: Scincidae
- Genus: Sphenomorphus
- Species: S. maindroni

Binomial name
- Sphenomorphus maindroni (Sauvage, 1879)

Synonyms
- Lygosoma (Hinulia) maindroni Sauvage, 1879; Lygosoma (Sphenomorphus) maindroni — M.A. Smith, 1937; Sphenomorphus maindroni — Greer, 1982

Species of lizard

Sphenomorphus maindroni is a species of skink. The species was originally described by Sauvage in 1879. According to the Catalogue of Life, the species Sphenomorphus maindroni does not have known subspecies.

== Description ==
The snout-to-vent length (SVL) is 24–59 mm (0.94–2.32 in). The tail varies from nearly oval to square in cross-section.

== Etymology ==
The specific name, maindroni, is in honor of French naturalist Maurice Maindron.

== Geographic range ==
Sphenomorphus maindroni is found in the Admiralty Islands, New Britain, and New Guinea.

== Habitat ==
The preferred natural habitat of Sphenomorphus maindroni is forest, at altitudes from sea level to 500 m (1,600 ft).

== Reproduction ==
Sphenomorphus maindroni is oviparous.
