= Plateros lictor =

Scientific classification
- Domain: Eukaryota
- Kingdom: Animalia
- Phylum: Arthropoda
- Class: Insecta
- Order: Coleoptera
- Suborder: Polyphaga
- Infraorder: Elateriformia
- Family: Lycidae
- Genus: Plateros
- Species: P. lictor

Binomial name
- Plateros lictor (Newman, 1838)

Species of beetle

Plateros lictor is a species of net-winged beetle in the family Lycidae. It is found in North America.
