= Camille Jourdheuille =

French entomologist

Camille Jourdheuille (1830–1909) was a French entomologist.

Jourdheuille was a Member of the Société académique d'agriculture, des sciences, arts et belles-lettres du département de l'Aube and of the Société entomologique de France (Président, 1892). He was a judge in Paris spending the summer months in Lusigny. Jourdheuille wrote:

- Liste des Microlépidoptères recueillis dans le département de l'Aube.Troyes. 1865 (in collaboration with Jules Joseph Ray).
- Catalogue des Lépidoptères du département de l'Aube, Mémoires de la Société Académique de l'Aube 1883
