= Étienne Rabaud =

French physician and entomologist

Étienne Antoine Prosper Jules Rabaud (12 September 1868 in Saint-Affrique – 3 September 1956 in Villemade) was a French zoologist, known for his studies of animal behavior.

From 1894 he served as an assistant in the laboratory of teratology at the École des Hautes-Études, and in 1898 he obtained doctorates in both medicine and sciences. In 1907 he became a maître de conférences at the faculty of sciences in Paris, where he was later named an assistant professor (1920), professor without chair (1921) and a professor of experimental biology (1923). From 1910 to 1919 he served as director of the laboratory at Wimereux.

In 1904 he was named secretary of the Société d'Anthropologie de Paris. Later on in his career, he was appointed president of the Société entomologique de France (1915) and the Société zoologique de France (1921). In 1937 he became an officer of the Légion d'honneur.

Rabaud was a supporter of Lamarckian evolution. In 1937, in his book La Matière vivante et l'hérédité (Living matter and heredity), he was ironic about the "American candor" and "singularly disturbing mentality" of Morgan, of which he rejected without appeal any scientific production. According to Jean Rostand, this is an example of the distressing attitude that certain French biologists had at that time and which earned France several decades lag in genetics.

== Selected works ==
- Le transformisme et l'expérience, 1911 – Transformism and experience.
- La tératogenèse; étude des variations de l'organisme, 1914 – Teratogenesis, study on variations of organisms.
- Eléments de Biologie générale, 1920 – Elements of general biology.
- L'hérédité, 1921 – On heredity.
- L'adaptation et l'évolution, 1922 – Adaption and evolution.
- J.H. Fabre et la science, 1924 – Jean-Henri Fabre and science.
- "How animals find their way about; a study of distant orientation and place-recognition" (English translation by I H Myers, 1928).
- Phénomène social et sociétés animales, 1937 – Social phenomena and animal societies.
- L'instinct et le comportement animal, 1939 – Instinct and animal behavior.
- Transformisme et adaptation, 1942 – Transformism and adaption.
