= Plateros volatus =

Scientific classification
- Domain: Eukaryota
- Kingdom: Animalia
- Phylum: Arthropoda
- Class: Insecta
- Order: Coleoptera
- Suborder: Polyphaga
- Infraorder: Elateriformia
- Family: Lycidae
- Genus: Plateros
- Species: P. volatus

Binomial name
- Plateros volatus Green, 1953

Species of beetle

Plateros volatus is a species of net-winged beetles in the family Lycidae. It is found in North America.
