= Jules Bourgeois =

French entomologist

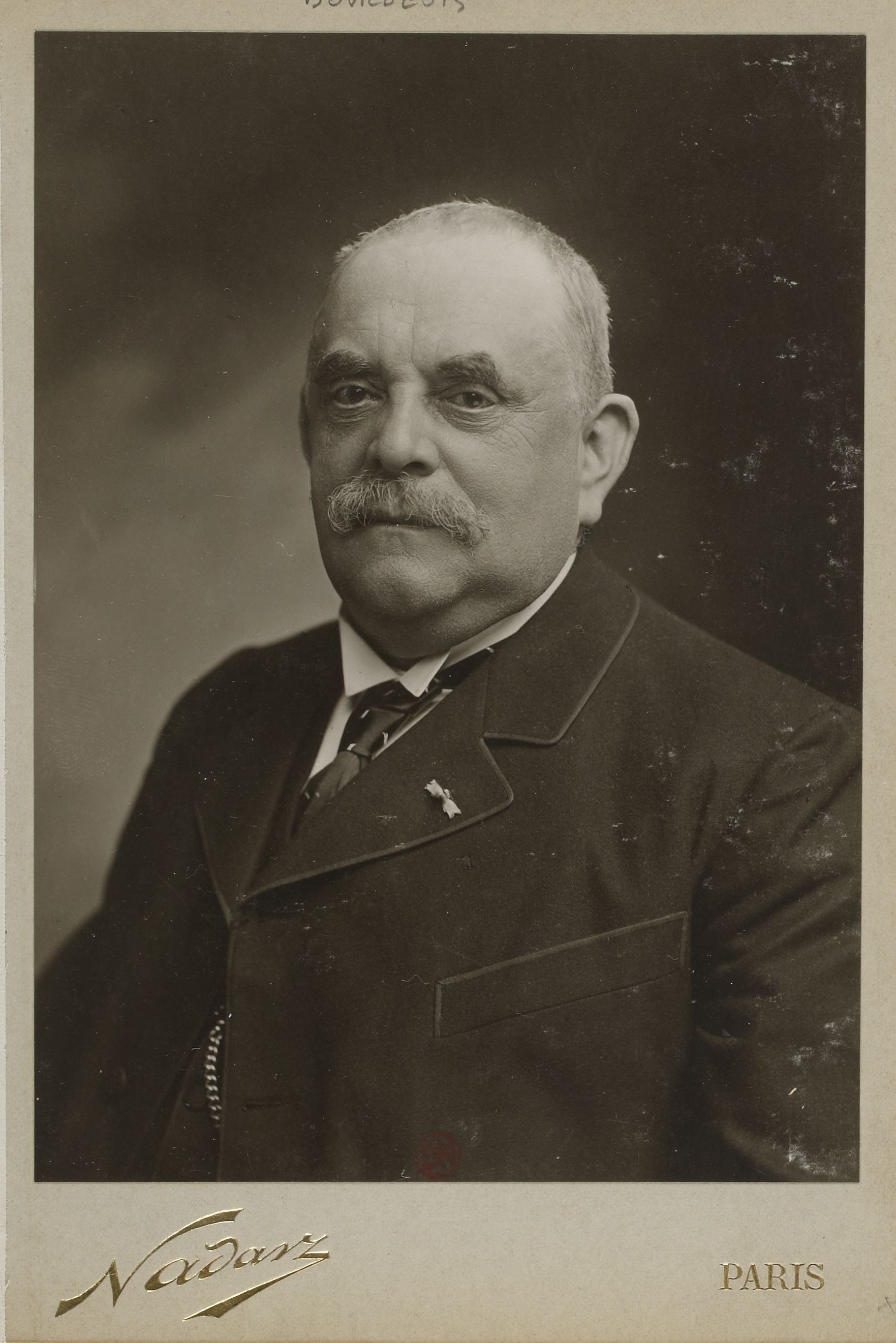
Portrait c. 1905

Jules Bourgeois (31 May 1847, Sainte-Marie-aux-Mines – 18 July 1911) was a French entomologist who specialised in Coleoptera. The French Academy of Sciences awarded him the Prix Thore for 1908 in recognition of his work on Chrysomela.

Jules Bourgeois was initially associated with his father and brother in Rouen, as the Paris representative of the family weaving business (1881-1889) and later worked at the spinning mills of H. Schwartz in Sainte Marie-aux-Mines from 1893. He used his leisure time to follow his true vocation, that of a naturalist. Bourgeois studied coleoptera then included in the then group Malacodermata, now unranked (Elateroidea (in part), Lymexyloidea, Cleroidea, Tenebrionoidea). He described several hundreds of new species in many scientific publications especially in the Bulletin and Annales of the Société entomologique de France of which he was a very active member. Bourgeois contributed to Alsatian entomology with his catalogue of the beetles of "la chaîne des Vosges" and surrounding regions published in part in 1898 in the Bulletin de la Société d’histoire naturelle de Colmar. This included information on 3000 species from numerous localities. The author thus showed the great richness of the entomological fauna of the Alsace, the richest of France, after the Provence and Côte d'Azur. With the death of Jules, the work, of 800 pages, was completed by Paul Scherdlin, conservator of the Musée zoologique de l'ULP et de la ville de Strasbourg, Strasbourg. In 1885, Jules Bourgeois had a rich collection of more than 15,000 species of Palearctic Coleoptera without counting the exotic species. Because of the annexation of Alsace in 1870, this collection, like many others, was transferred to Paris. Jules' brother Lt. Colonel Robert Bourgeois headed the Mission Géodésique de l ́Equateur (1901–1906) to Ecuador and was sent the beetles that were collected. It is currently in the Muséum national d'histoire naturelle. Jules Bourgeois was a member of the Société naturelle de Colmar, chair of the Société entomologique de France in 1883, and prize winner of the Dollfus price in 1894 allotted by the same society. His ore and mineral collection of the Rouen valley is one of the treasures of the museum of natural history in Paris. In parallel, he was devoted to local history and collaborated actively in the journal La Revue d’Alsace.
