= Joseph-Étienne Giraud =

French doctor and entomologist (1808–1877)

Joseph-Étienne Giraud (31 January 1808, Briançon – 28 May 1877, Paris) was a French medical doctor and entomologist specializing in Hymenoptera with an additional interest in Coleoptera.

Giraud practised medicine in Vienna and Paris. He became the President of the Société entomologique de France for the year 1870.

== Works ==
Hymenoptera

- Note sur un Hyménoptère nouveau du genre Ampulex, trouvé aux environs de Vienne.Verhandlungen der kaiserlich-königlichen Zoologisch-Botanischen Gesellschaft in Wien 8:441-448 (1858).
- Signalements de quelques espèces nouvelles de Cynipides et de leurs Galles. Verhandlungen des Zoologisch-Botanischen Vereins in Wien 9.:337–374 (1859)
- Hyménoptères recueillis aux environs de Suse, en Piémont, et dans le département des Hautes-Alpes, en France; et Description de quinze espèces nouvelles. Verhandlungen der kaiserlichköniglichen Zoologisch-Botanischen Gesellschaft in Wien 13:11-46 (1863).
- Mémoire sur les Insectes qui vivent sur le Roseau common, Phragmites communis Trin.(Arundo phragmites L.) et plus spécialement sur ceux de l’ordre des Hyménoptères.Verhandlungen der kaiserlich-königlichen Zoologisch-Botanischen Gesellschaft in Wien 13:1251-1312, pl. XXII. (1863).
- Mémoire sur les Insecte qui habitent les tiges sèches de la Ronce. Annales de la Société Entomologique de France (Série

4) 6:443-500.

- Observations hyménoptérologiques. Hyménoptère nouveau de la famille des fouisseurs.Annales de la Société Entomologique de France (Série 4) 9:469-473 (1869).
- Liste des éclosions d'insects observées par le Dr Joseph-Étienne Giraud ... recueillie et annotée par M. le Dr Alexandre Laboulbène. Annales de la Société Entomologique de France (Ser. 5), 7, 397-436 (1877).

Coleoptera

- Coleopterenfauna von Gastein Verh. zool.-bot. Ver. Wien, 1: 84-98, 132-140 (1852).
