= Plateros sollicitus =

Scientific classification
- Kingdom: Animalia
- Phylum: Arthropoda
- Class: Insecta
- Order: Coleoptera
- Suborder: Polyphaga
- Infraorder: Elateriformia
- Family: Lycidae
- Genus: Plateros
- Species: P. sollicitus

Binomial name
- Plateros sollicitus (LeConte, 1847)

Species of beetle

Plateros sollicitus is a species of net-winged beetle in the family Lycidae. It is found in North America.
