= Philippe Alexandre Jules Künckel d'Herculais =

French entomologist (1843–1918)

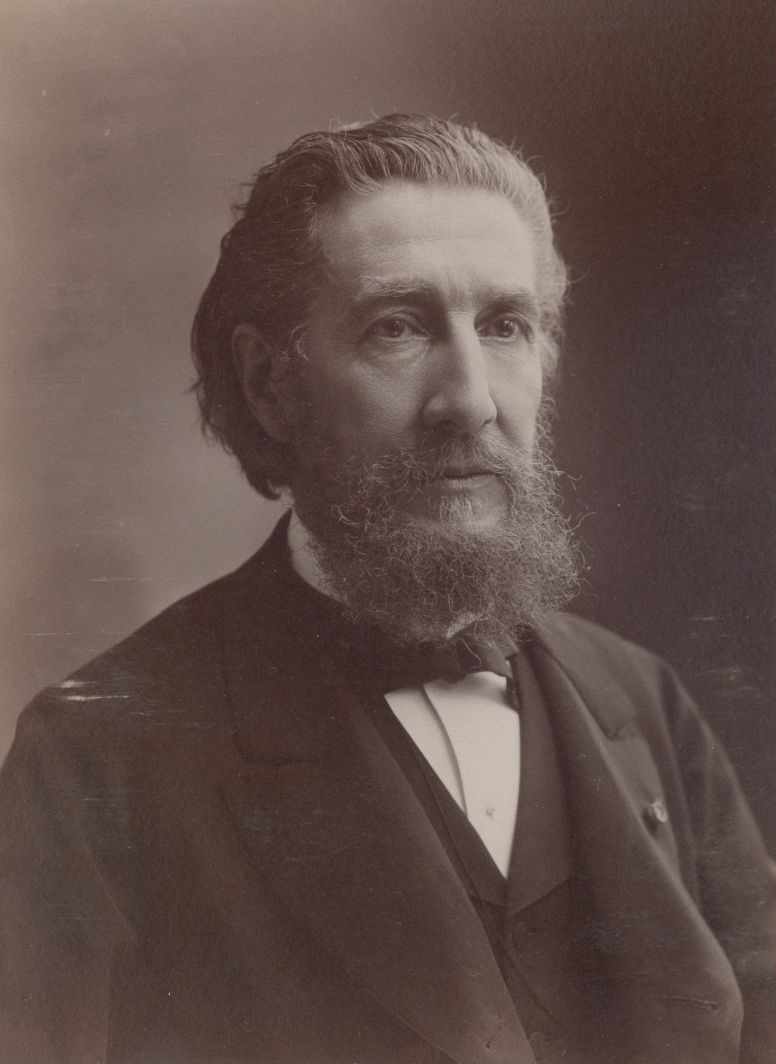

Philippe Alexandre Jules Künckel d'Herculais (10 February 1843 Paris – 22 December 1918 Conflans-sur-Oise) was a French entomologist and zoologist.

He was the nephew of the French chemist Théophile-Jules Pelouze (1807–1867) and the son of a doctor. He lost his father when he was two years old. After his baccalauré in 1860, he entered École des mines in 1861. He preferred, in 1864, to follow less theoretical courses at Collège de France, at Muséum national d'histoire naturelle and at the Sorbonne.

He then met Émile Blanchard (1819–1900) becoming his pupil and private secretary. In 1866, he published his first mémoire which was on the anatomy of Hemiptera. In 1869, he entered the Muséum national d'histoire naturelle where he aided Émile Blanchard. He replaced Alphonse Milne-Edwards (1835–1900) who became assistant to his father Henri Milne-Edwards (1800–1885). He became one of the first teachers at the l'Institut national d'agronomie founded in 1876 leaving to study grasshoppers in Argentina for several years around 1885. He also studied crop pests in Algeria and Corsica.

In 1884, he described a species of gibbon, the Eastern black crested gibbon, which, as of 2022, is critically endangered.

In 1891 it was widely, but erroneously, reported that Künckel d'Herculais had been killed and eaten by a swarm of locusts in Algeria.

He was elected president of the Société entomologique de France in the years 1908 and 1909.

== Sources ==
- Philippe Jaussaud & Édouard R. Brygoo (2004). Du Jardin au Muséum en 516 biographies. Muséum national d’histoire naturelle de Paris : 630 p. (ISBN 2-85653-565-8)
- Translation of French Wikipedia
