= Louis Jérôme Reiche =

French merchant, manufacturer and entomologist

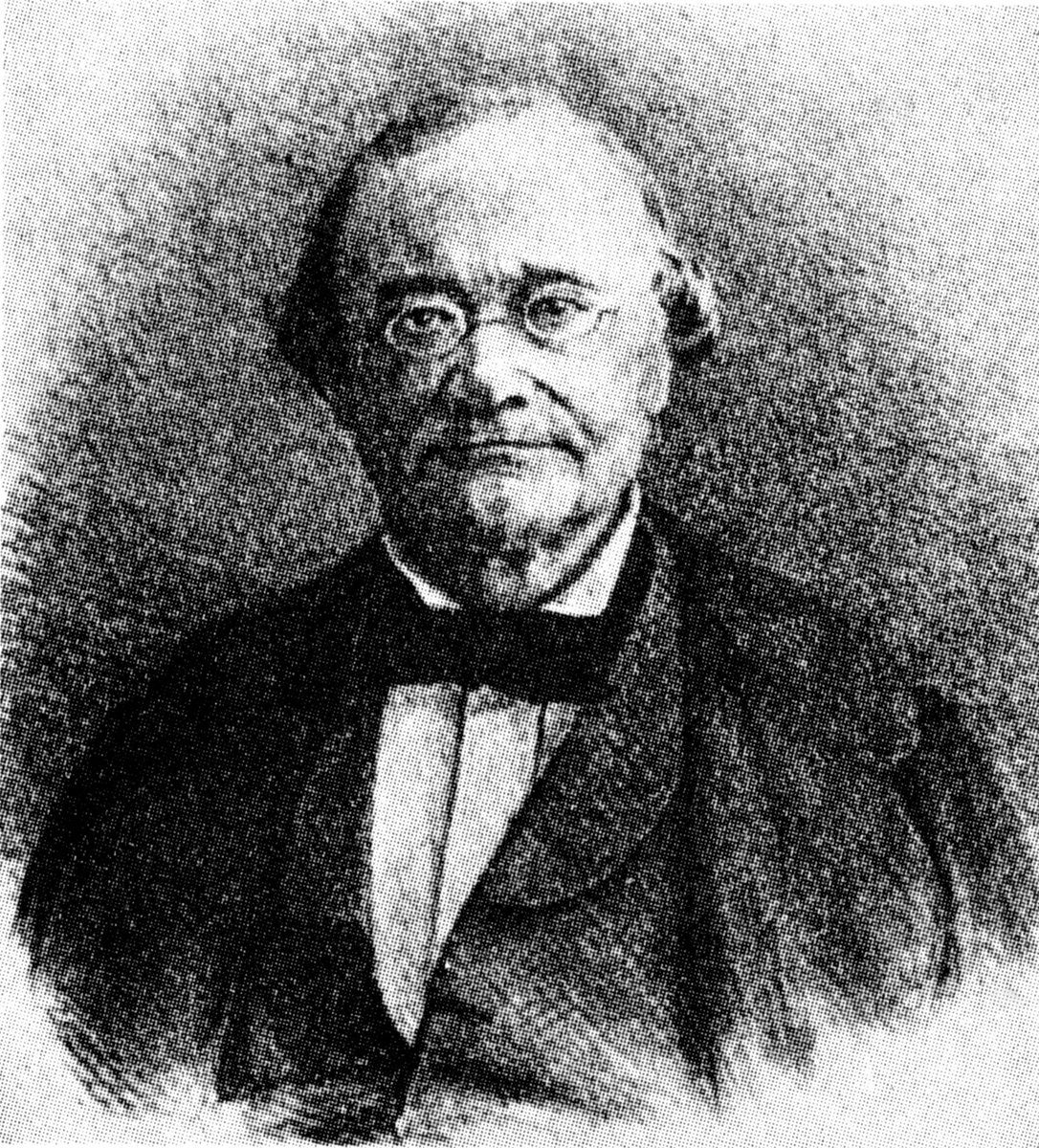
Louis Jérôme Reiche.

Louis Jérôme Reiche (20 December 1799, Gorinchem, Batavian Republic – 16 May 1890, Neuilly-sur-Seine), was a French merchant, manufacturer and entomologist.

Reiche travelled widely in Europe making a large insect collection principally of beetles. He wrote 65 scientific papers and was a founder of the Société entomologique de France becoming president on six occasions. Reiche was a merchant and manufacturer in Paris but suffered from severe losses at the time of the war of 1870, and had to sell his collection and library.

== See also ==
- Category:Taxa named by Louis Jérôme Reiche

== Sources ==
- Edward Oliver Essig (1931). A History of Entomology. Mac Millan (New York) : vii + 1029 p.
- Jean Gouillard (2004). Histoire des entomologistes français, 1750–1950. Édition entièrement revue et augmentée. Boubée (Paris) : 287 p.
