= Société entomologique de France =

French society devoted to the study of insects

The Société entomologique de France (French pronunciation: [sɔsjete ɑ̃tɔmɔlɔʒik də fʁɑ̃s]), or French Entomological Society, is devoted to the study of insects. The society was founded in 1832 in Paris, France.

The society was created by eighteen Parisian entomologists on 31 January 1832. The first (honorary) president was Pierre André Latreille (1762–1833) who was elected unanimously and established the goal of the society to contribute to and progress the development of entomology in all its aspects. The main publications of the society are Bulletin de la Société entomologique de France, Annales de la Société entomologique de France and, for a few years, L'Entomologiste, Revue d'Amateurs. The library contains 15,000 volumes and 1,500 titles of old or current literature.

== Lists ==
- List of presidents of the Société entomologique de France
