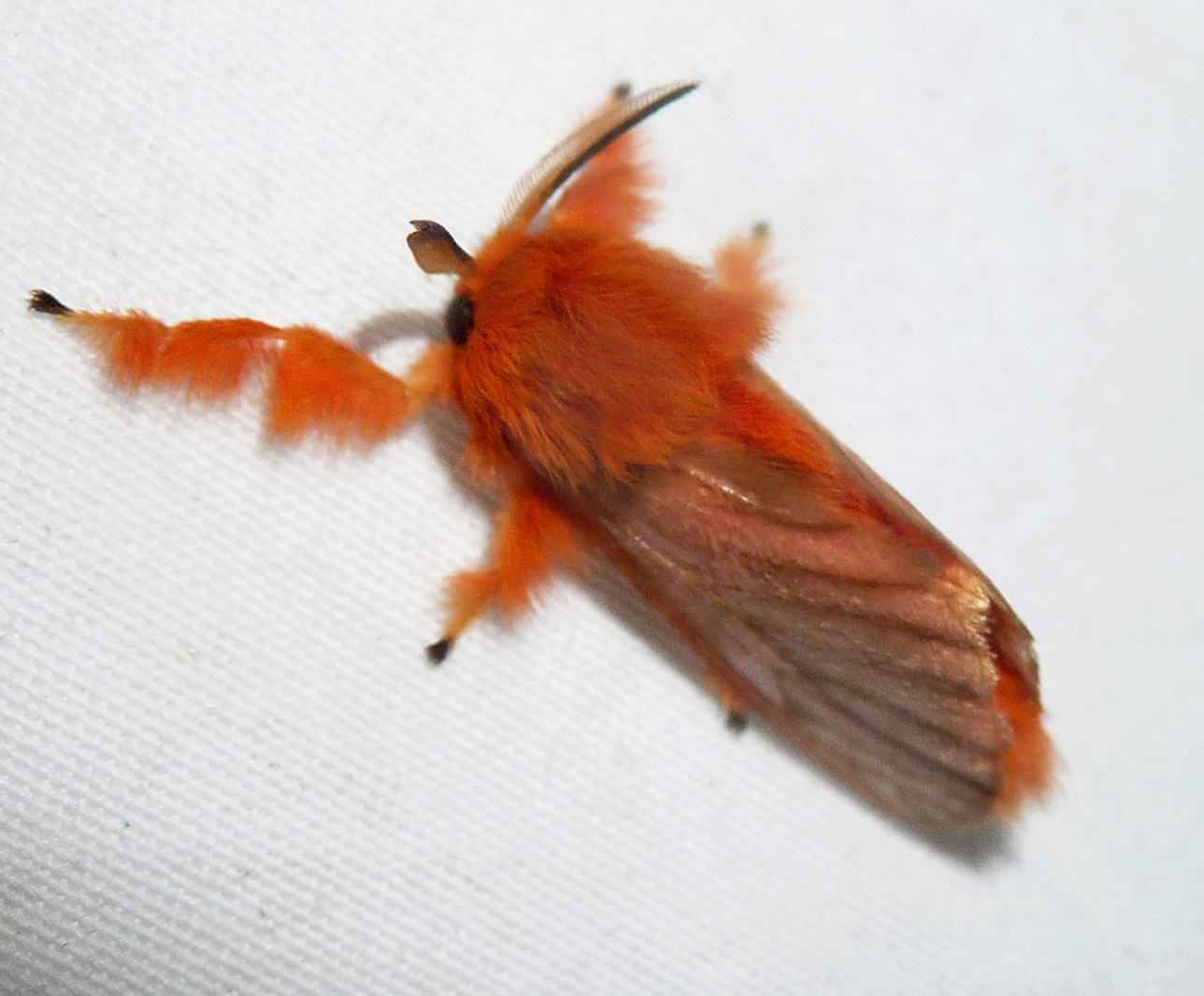
- Acraga moorei imago

Scientific classification
- Domain: Eukaryota
- Kingdom: Animalia
- Phylum: Arthropoda
- Class: Insecta
- Order: Lepidoptera
- Family: Dalceridae
- Subfamily: Acraginae
- Genus: Acraga; Walker, 1855

Synonyms
- Aeruga Pagenstecher, 1909; Pinconia Moore, 1882; Epipinconia Dyar, 1898; Anacraga Dyar, 1905; Dalargentina Orfila, 1961

= Acraga =

Genus of moths

Acraga is a genus of moths of the family Dalceridae. The genus has neotropical distribution.

== Species ==
- Acraga goes group:
  - Acraga goes Schaus, 1910
  - Acraga ingenescens (Dyar, 1927)
  - Acraga luteola (Hopp, 1921)
- Acraga hamata group:
  - Acraga hamata Schaus, 1910
  - Acraga andina S.E. Miller, 1994
- Acraga flava group:
  - Acraga flava (Walker, 1855)
  - Acraga obscura (Schaus, 1896)
- Acraga infusa group:
  - Acraga infusa Schaus, 1905
  - Acraga conda Dyar, 1911
  - Acraga philetera (Schaus, 1910)
  - Acraga ria (Dyar, 1910)
  - Acraga neblina S.E. Miller, 1994
  - Acraga serrata S.E. Miller, 1994
- Acraga ciliata group:
  - Acraga ciliata Walker, 1855
  - Acraga moorei Dyar, 1898
  - Acraga coa (Schaus, 1892)
  - Acraga chicana S.E. Miller, 1994
- Acraga concolor group:
  - Acraga concolor (Walker, 1865)
  - Acraga citrinopsis (Dyar, 1927)
  - Acraga beebei S.E. Miller, 1994
- Acraga melinda group:
  - Acraga melinda (Druce, 1898)
  - Acraga amazonica S.E. Miller, 1994
  - Acraga meridensis Dognin, 1907
  - Acraga mariala Dognin, 1923
  - Acraga perbrunnea Dyar, 1927
- Acraga citrina group:
  - Acraga citrina (Schaus, 1896)
  - Acraga hoppiana S.E. Miller, 1994
- Acraga ferruginea group:
  - Acraga ferruginea Hopp, 1922
  - Acraga brunnea S.E. Miller, 1994
- Acraga ampela group:
  - Acraga ampela (Druce, 1890)
  - Acraga puno S.E. Miller, 1994
  - Acraga boliviana Hopp, 1921
  - Acraga angulifera Schaus, 1905
  - Acraga isothea Dognin, 1914
  - Acraga leberna (Druce, 1890)
  - Acraga umbrifera (Schaus, 1905)
- Acraga ochracea group:
  - Acraga ochracea (Walker, 1855)
  - Acraga victoria S.E. Miller, 1994
  - Acraga sexquicentenaria (Orfila, 1961)
  - Acraga parana S.E. Miller, 1994

== Former species ==
- Acraga albescens Hopp, 1929
- Acraga arcifera Dyar, 1910
- Acraga canaquitam Dyar, 1925
- Acraga caretta Dyar, 1910
- Acraga cosmia Dognin, 1911
- Acraga dulciola Dyar, 1914
- Acraga gugelmanni Dyar, 1916
- Acraga mesoa Druce, 1887
- Acraga moribunda Schaus, 1920
- Acraga nana Dognin, 1920
- Acraga phasma Dyar, 1927
- Acraga rebella Schaus, 1911
- Acraga sofia Dyar, 1910
- Acraga sororcula Dyar, 1927
