= Acraga philetera =

Scientific classification
- Kingdom: Animalia
- Phylum: Arthropoda
- Class: Insecta
- Order: Lepidoptera
- Family: Dalceridae
- Genus: Acraga
- Species: A. philetera

Binomial name
- Acraga philetera (Schaus, 1910)

Synonyms
- Anacraga philetera Schaus, 1910

Species of moth

Acraga philetera is a moth in the family Dalceridae. It was described by William Schaus in 1910. It is found in Costa Rica.

The wingspan is about 22 mm. The body is orange and the forewings are orange, darkest on the inner margin. The hindwings are orange with the costal margin broadly whitish yellow. The underside is paler.

== Taxonomy ==
Acraga philetera, together with Acraga infusa and Acraga conda, is part of the Acraga infusa species complex. It is not clear which one(s) of these names are valid.
