= Dalcerides ingenita =

Scientific classification
- Domain: Eukaryota
- Kingdom: Animalia
- Phylum: Arthropoda
- Class: Insecta
- Order: Lepidoptera
- Family: Dalceridae
- Genus: Dalcerides
- Species: D. ingenita

Binomial name
- Dalcerides ingenita (H. Edwards, 1882)

Synonyms
- Artaxa ingenita H. Edwards, 1882

Species of moth

Dalcerides ingenita is a moth in the family Dalceridae. It was described by Henry Edwards in 1882. It is found in the US from southeastern Arizona, north through the mountains to Flagstaff. It is also found in southwestern Texas and Mexico.

Adults are on wing from late April to September in Arizona and from July to December in Mexico. In Arizona Dalcerides ingenita, along with the similar geometrid Eubaphe unicolor, is part of a mimetic complex modeled on Lycus loripes and Lycus simulans.

The larvae feed on Arctostaphylos pungens, Quercus emoryi and Quercus oblongifolia.
