= Acraga mariala =

Scientific classification
- Domain: Eukaryota
- Kingdom: Animalia
- Phylum: Arthropoda
- Class: Insecta
- Order: Lepidoptera
- Family: Dalceridae
- Genus: Acraga
- Species: A. mariala

Binomial name
- Acraga mariala Dognin, 1923

Species of moth

Acraga mariala is a moth of the family Dalceridae. It is found in Colombia. The habitat consists of tropical lower montane or premontane wet and tropical lower montane moist forests.

The length of the forewings is 13 mm for males and 16 mm for females. Adults are very similar to Acraga meridensis. Adults are on wing in July and August.
