= Minacraga similis =

Scientific classification
- Domain: Eukaryota
- Kingdom: Animalia
- Phylum: Arthropoda
- Class: Insecta
- Order: Lepidoptera
- Family: Dalceridae
- Genus: Minacraga
- Species: M. similis

Binomial name
- Minacraga similis S.E. Miller, 1994

Species of moth

Minacraga similis is a moth in the family Dalceridae. It was described by S.E. Miller in 1994. It is found in southern Venezuela and probably adjacent northern Brazil.

The length of the forewings is 14 mm. Adults are coloured as Minacraga disconitens. Adults have been recorded on wing in February.
