= Acraga melinda =

Scientific classification
- Domain: Eukaryota
- Kingdom: Animalia
- Phylum: Arthropoda
- Class: Insecta
- Order: Lepidoptera
- Family: Dalceridae
- Genus: Acraga
- Species: A. melinda

Binomial name
- Acraga melinda (H. Druce, 1898)

Synonyms
- Pinconia melinda H. Druce, 1898

Species of moth

Acraga melinda is a moth of the family Dalceridae first described by Herbert Druce in 1898. It is found in Costa Rica and Panama. The habitat consists of tropical premontane wet and rain forests where it is found at altitudes above 600 meters.

The length of the forewings is 14–17 mm for males and 20–23 mm for females. Adults are on wing from February to March, from May to September and in December.
