= Paracraga pulverina =

Scientific classification
- Kingdom: Animalia
- Phylum: Arthropoda
- Class: Insecta
- Order: Lepidoptera
- Family: Dalceridae
- Genus: Paracraga
- Species: P. pulverina

Binomial name
- Paracraga pulverina Schaus, 1920

Species of moth

Paracraga pulverina is a moth in the family Dalceridae. It was described by Schaus in 1920. It is found in Guatemala.
