= Minonoa pachitea =

Scientific classification
- Kingdom: Animalia
- Phylum: Arthropoda
- Class: Insecta
- Order: Lepidoptera
- Family: Dalceridae
- Genus: Minonoa
- Species: M. pachitea

Binomial name
- Minonoa pachitea Hopp, 1922

Species of moth

Minonoa pachitea is a moth in the family Dalceridae. It was first described by German entomologist Walter Hopp in 1922. It is found in Peru. The habitat consists of tropical moist and/or tropical dry forests.

The length of its forewings is 10 mm.
