= Acraga victoria =

Scientific classification
- Kingdom: Animalia
- Phylum: Arthropoda
- Class: Insecta
- Order: Lepidoptera
- Family: Dalceridae
- Genus: Acraga
- Species: A. victoria

Binomial name
- Acraga victoria S.E. Miller, 1994

Species of moth

Acraga victoria is a moth in the family Dalceridae. It was described by S.E. Miller in 1994. It is found in southern Brazil. The habitat consists of warm temperate wet forests.

The length of the forewings is 11.5–12 mm. Adults have been recorded on wing in January.
