= Acraga chicana =

Scientific classification
- Domain: Eukaryota
- Kingdom: Animalia
- Phylum: Arthropoda
- Class: Insecta
- Order: Lepidoptera
- Family: Dalceridae
- Genus: Acraga
- Species: A. chicana

Binomial name
- Acraga chicana Miller, 1994

Species of moth

Acraga chicana is a moth of the family Dalceridae. It is found in southern Mexico. The habitat consists of subtropical moist forests.

The length of the forewings is about 13 mm. Adults have been recorded on wing in January.
