= Zikanyrops sparsa =

Scientific classification
- Domain: Eukaryota
- Kingdom: Animalia
- Phylum: Arthropoda
- Class: Insecta
- Order: Lepidoptera
- Family: Dalceridae
- Genus: Zikanyrops
- Species: Z. sparsa

Binomial name
- Zikanyrops sparsa Hopp, 1928

Species of moth

Zikanyrops sparsa is a moth in the family Dalceridae. It was described by Walter Hopp in 1928. It is found in southern Brazil. The habitat consists of subtropical lower montane moist forests.

The length of the forewings is 8.5 mm. Adults have been recorded on wing in November.
