= Acraga concolor =

Scientific classification
- Kingdom: Animalia
- Phylum: Arthropoda
- Class: Insecta
- Order: Lepidoptera
- Family: Dalceridae
- Genus: Acraga
- Species: A. concolor

Binomial name
- Acraga concolor (Walker, 1865)

Synonyms
- Limacodes concolor Walker, 1865

Species of moth

Acraga concolor is a moth from the family Dalceridae. It is found in Venezuela, Suriname, French Guiana, northern Brazil (Amazon Basin), Ecuador, Peru and Bolivia. The habitat consists of tropical moist, tropical wet, tropical premontane rain, tropical premontane wet and subtropical moist forests.

The length of the forewings is 9–10 mm. Adults are on wing year-round.
