= Ca anastigma =

Scientific classification
- Domain: Eukaryota
- Kingdom: Animalia
- Phylum: Arthropoda
- Class: Insecta
- Order: Lepidoptera
- Family: Dalceridae
- Genus: Ca
- Species: C. anastigma

Binomial name
- Ca anastigma Dyar, 1914

Species of moth

Ca anastigma is a moth in the family Dalceridae. It was described by Harrison Gray Dyar Jr. in 1914. It is known from the tropical moist forest zone of Panama.

The forewing length is 6 mm (0.24 in) in male.
