= Ca (moth) =

Scientific classification
- Kingdom: Animalia
- Phylum: Arthropoda
- Class: Insecta
- Order: Lepidoptera
- Family: Dalceridae
- Genus: Ca; Dyar, 1914

Genus of moths

Ca is a genus of moths of the family Dalceridae.

== Species ==
- Ca anastigma Dyar, 1914

== Former species ==
- Ca restricta Schaus, 1940
