= Acraga luteola =

Scientific classification
- Domain: Eukaryota
- Kingdom: Animalia
- Phylum: Arthropoda
- Class: Insecta
- Order: Lepidoptera
- Family: Dalceridae
- Genus: Acraga
- Species: A. luteola

Binomial name
- Acraga luteola (Hopp, 1921)

Synonyms
- Anacraga luteola Hopp, 1921

Species of moth

Acraga luteola is a moth of the family Dalceridae. It is found in northern Brazil (Amazon Basin). The habitat probably consists of tropical moist forests.

The length of the forewings is about 22 mm.
