= Acraga goes =

Scientific classification
- Domain: Eukaryota
- Kingdom: Animalia
- Phylum: Arthropoda
- Class: Insecta
- Order: Lepidoptera
- Family: Dalceridae
- Genus: Acraga
- Species: A. goes

Binomial name
- Acraga goes Schaus, 1910

Synonyms
- Anacraga goes

Species of moth

Acraga goes is a moth of the family Dalceridae. It is found in Costa Rica, Ecuador, Venezuela, Trinidad, Guyana, Suriname, French Guiana, Colombia, Peru and Brazil. The habitat consists of tropical wet, tropical moist, tropical dry, tropical premontane wet, tropical premontane moist and subtropical dry forests.

The length of the forewings is 9–11 mm for males and 14–16 mm for females. Adults are on wing year-round.
