= Acraga puno =

Scientific classification
- Kingdom: Animalia
- Phylum: Arthropoda
- Class: Insecta
- Order: Lepidoptera
- Family: Dalceridae
- Genus: Acraga
- Species: A. puno

Binomial name
- Acraga puno S.E. Miller, 1994

Species of moth

Acraga puno is a moth in the family Dalceridae. It was described by S.E. Miller in 1994. It is found in southern Peru. The habitat consists of tropical moist and tropical premontane wet forests.

The length of the forewings in male is 14 mm (0.55 in).
