= Acraga conda =

Scientific classification
- Kingdom: Animalia
- Phylum: Arthropoda
- Class: Insecta
- Order: Lepidoptera
- Family: Dalceridae
- Genus: Acraga
- Species: A. conda

Binomial name
- Acraga conda Dyar, 1911

Synonyms
- Acraga ochracea var. conda Dyar, 1911

Species of moth

Acraga conda is a moth in the family Dalceridae. It was described by Harrison Gray Dyar Jr. in 1911. It is found in the Guianas.

== Taxonomy ==
Acraga conda is part of the Acraga infusa species complex.
