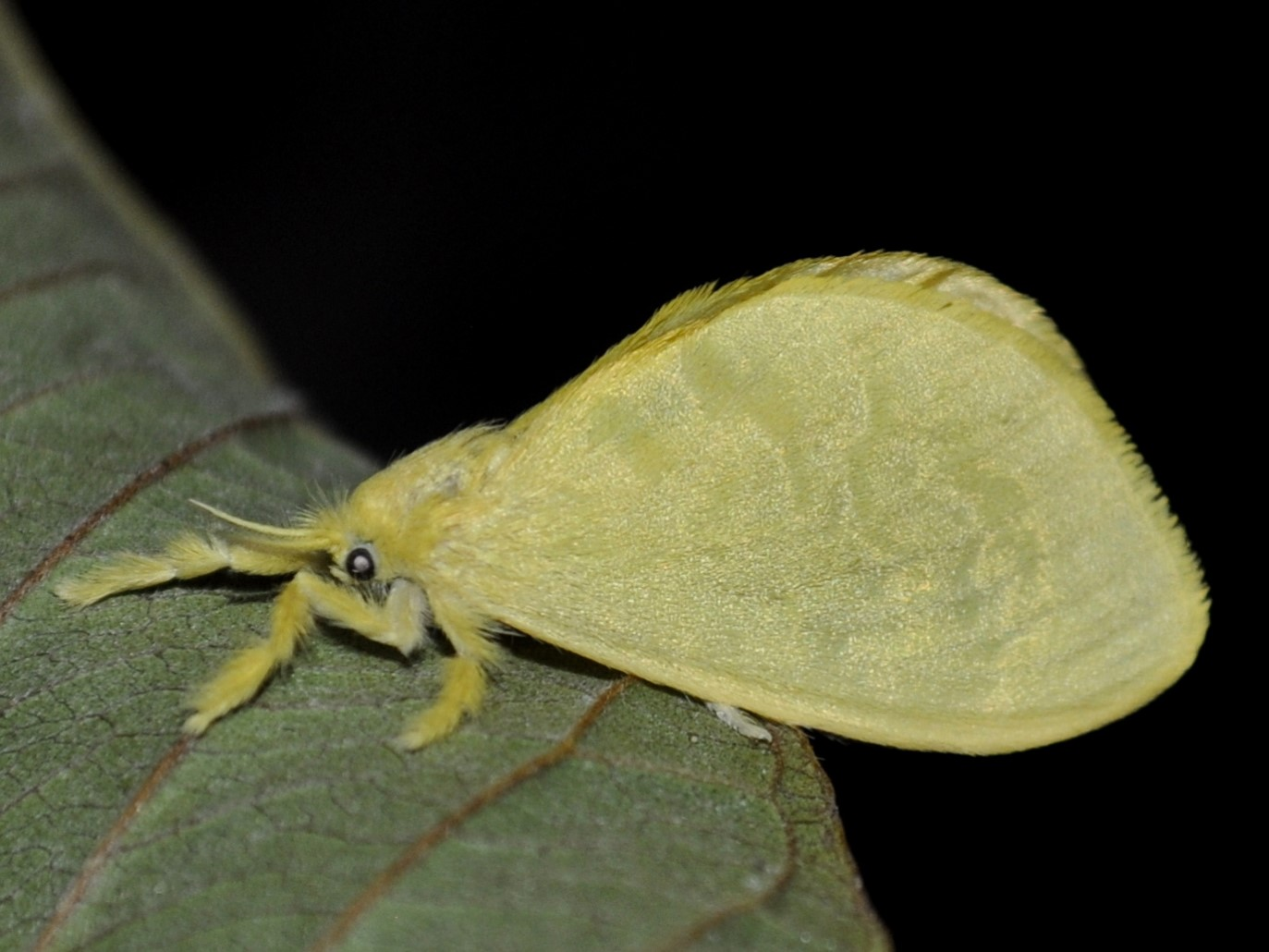

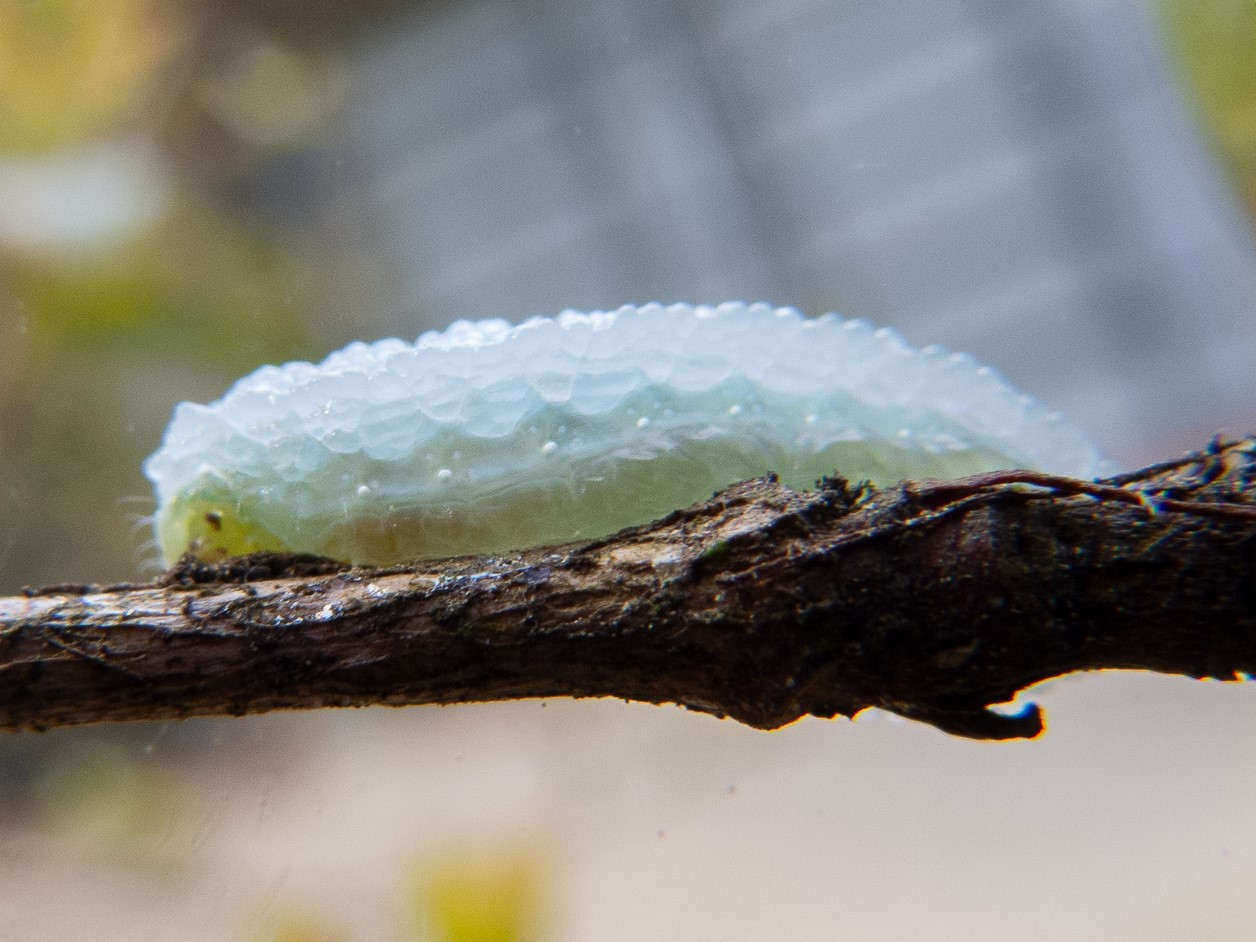
- Adult (top) and larva (bottom)

Scientific classification
- Kingdom: Animalia
- Phylum: Arthropoda
- Clade: Pancrustacea
- Class: Insecta
- Order: Lepidoptera
- Family: Dalceridae
- Genus: Acraga
- Species: A. flava

Binomial name
- Acraga flava (Walker, 1855)

Synonyms
- Dalcera flava Walker, 1855; Caviria sulphurea Burmeister, 1878; Epipinconia flava

= Acraga flava =

Species of moth

Acraga flava is a species of moth in the family Dalceridae. It is found in southern Brazil and northern Argentina.

The length of the forewings is 12–13 mm for males and 14–19 mm for females. The hindwings are pale yellow. Adults are on wing year-round.

The larvae feed on Nectandra, Psidium guajava and Prunus domestica.
