= Acraga perbrunnea =

Scientific classification
- Kingdom: Animalia
- Phylum: Arthropoda
- Class: Insecta
- Order: Lepidoptera
- Family: Dalceridae
- Genus: Acraga
- Species: A. perbrunnea

Binomial name
- Acraga perbrunnea Dyar, 1927

Species of moth

Acraga perbrunnea is a moth of the family Dalceridae. It is found in Colombia and Peru. The habitat consists of tropical lower montane moist (maybe also dry) and tropical premontane (or lower montane) wet forests.
