= Paracraga amianta =

Scientific classification
- Kingdom: Animalia
- Phylum: Arthropoda
- Class: Insecta
- Order: Lepidoptera
- Family: Dalceridae
- Genus: Paracraga
- Species: P. amianta

Binomial name
- Paracraga amianta Dyar, 1909

Species of moth

Paracraga amianta is a moth in the family Dalceridae. It was described by Harrison Gray Dyar Jr. in 1909. It is found in Guyana. The habitat consists of tropical moist forests.

The length of the forewings is 11.5 mm. Adults have been recorded on wing in February.
