= Acraga serrata =

Scientific classification
- Kingdom: Animalia
- Phylum: Arthropoda
- Class: Insecta
- Order: Lepidoptera
- Family: Dalceridae
- Genus: Acraga
- Species: A. serrata

Binomial name
- Acraga serrata Miller, 1994

Species of moth

Acraga serrata is a moth of the family Dalceridae. It is found in the Amazon Basin in Brazil and Peru. The habitat consists of tropical moist forests.

The length of the forewings is 11–13 mm. Adults are on wing in January, September, November and December.
