= Paracraga innocens =

Scientific classification
- Kingdom: Animalia
- Phylum: Arthropoda
- Clade: Pancrustacea
- Class: Insecta
- Order: Lepidoptera
- Family: Dalceridae
- Genus: Paracraga
- Species: P. innocens

Binomial name
- Paracraga innocens Schaus, 1905

Synonyms
- Paracraga oxydata Hopp, 1921

Species of moth

Paracraga innocens is a moth in the family Dalceridae. It was described by Schaus in 1905.

The length of the forewings is 9–11 mm for males and 12–14 mm for females. Adults are on wing from October to July.
