= Minacragides =

Scientific classification
- Kingdom: Animalia
- Phylum: Arthropoda
- Class: Insecta
- Order: Lepidoptera
- Family: Dalceridae
- Genus: Minacragides; Dyar, 1910

Genus of moths

Minacragides is a genus of moths of the family Dalceridae.

== Species ==
- Minacragides arnacis Dyar, 1909

== Former species ==
- Minacragides argentata Hopp, 1922
