= Acraga parana =

Scientific classification
- Domain: Eukaryota
- Kingdom: Animalia
- Phylum: Arthropoda
- Class: Insecta
- Order: Lepidoptera
- Family: Dalceridae
- Genus: Acraga
- Species: A. parana

Binomial name
- Acraga parana S.E. Miller, 1994

Species of moth

Acraga parana is a moth in the family Dalceridae. It was described by S.E. Miller in 1994. It is found in southern Brazil and Paraguay. The habitat consists of subtropical wet, subtropical moist and warm temperate moist forests.

The length of the forewings is 11.5–14 mm. Adults are on wing from April to June, in September and from November to February.

== Etymology ==
The species name refers to the type locality.
