= Dalcerides chirma =

Scientific classification
- Kingdom: Animalia
- Phylum: Arthropoda
- Clade: Pancrustacea
- Class: Insecta
- Order: Lepidoptera
- Family: Dalceridae
- Genus: Dalcerides
- Species: D. chirma

Binomial name
- Dalcerides chirma (Schaus, 1920)

Synonyms
- Acragopsis chirma Schaus, 1920

Species of moth

Dalcerides chirma is a moth in the family Dalceridae. It was described by Schaus in 1920. It is found in southern Mexico and Guatemala. The habitat consists of tropical moist and subtropical wet forests.
