= Acraga ferruginea =

Scientific classification
- Domain: Eukaryota
- Kingdom: Animalia
- Phylum: Arthropoda
- Class: Insecta
- Order: Lepidoptera
- Family: Dalceridae
- Genus: Acraga
- Species: A. ferruginea

Binomial name
- Acraga ferruginea Hopp, 1922

Species of moth

Acraga ferruginea is a moth of the family Dalceridae. It is found in southern Brazil. The habitat consists of subtropical wet and moist forests.

The length of the forewings is 12 mm for males and 17 mm for females. Adults are on wing in March, June, July, September and October.
