= Acraga isothea =

Scientific classification
- Domain: Eukaryota
- Kingdom: Animalia
- Phylum: Arthropoda
- Class: Insecta
- Order: Lepidoptera
- Family: Dalceridae
- Genus: Acraga
- Species: A. isothea

Binomial name
- Acraga isothea Dognin, 1914

Species of moth

Acraga isothea is a moth in the family Dalceridae. It was described by Paul Dognin in 1914. It is found in Costa Rica and Panama. The habitat consists of tropical premontane wet and rain forests.

The length of the forewings is 12–14 mm (0.47–0.55 in) for males.
