= Acraga andina =

Scientific classification
- Domain: Eukaryota
- Kingdom: Animalia
- Phylum: Arthropoda
- Class: Insecta
- Order: Lepidoptera
- Family: Dalceridae
- Genus: Acraga
- Species: A. andina

Binomial name
- Acraga andina Miller, 1994

Species of moth

Acraga andina is a moth of the family Dalceridae. It is found in Andes Mountains of Venezuela, Colombia, Ecuador and Peru. The habitat consists of tropical wet, tropical premontane wet, tropical premontane moist and probably tropical montane wet forests.

The length of the forewings is 14–17 mm for males and 19 mm for females. Adults are on wing in February, July and December.
