= Acraga hamata =

Scientific classification
- Domain: Eukaryota
- Kingdom: Animalia
- Phylum: Arthropoda
- Class: Insecta
- Order: Lepidoptera
- Family: Dalceridae
- Genus: Acraga
- Species: A. hamata

Binomial name
- Acraga hamata Schaus, 1910

Species of moth

Acraga hamata is a moth of the family Dalceridae. It is found in Costa Rica, Panama and possibly Colombia. The habitat consists of tropical premontane wet and rain forests at altitudes above 800 meters.

The length of the forewings is 14–16 mm for males and 21 mm for females. Adults are on wing from May to February.
