= Acraga ochracea =

Scientific classification
- Kingdom: Animalia
- Phylum: Arthropoda
- Class: Insecta
- Order: Lepidoptera
- Family: Dalceridae
- Genus: Acraga
- Species: A. ochracea

Binomial name
- Acraga ochracea (Walker, 1855)

Synonyms
- Dalcera ochracea Walker, 1855

Species of moth

Acraga ochracea is a moth in the family Dalceridae. It was described by Francis Walker in 1855. It is found in southern Brazil, Paraguay and northern Argentina.

The length of the forewings is 9–13 mm for males and 16–17 mm for females. Adults are on wing year round.
