= Acraga angulifera =

Scientific classification
- Kingdom: Animalia
- Phylum: Arthropoda
- Clade: Pancrustacea
- Class: Insecta
- Order: Lepidoptera
- Family: Dalceridae
- Genus: Acraga
- Species: A. angulifera

Binomial name
- Acraga angulifera Schaus, 1905

Species of moth

Acraga angulifera is a moth in the family Dalceridae. It was described by William Schaus in 1905. It is found in Trinidad, Venezuela, Suriname and French Guiana. The habitat consists of tropical moist forests.

The forewing length is 11–12 mm (0.43–0.47 in) for males. Adults are on wing all year round.
