= Paracraga argentea =

Scientific classification
- Kingdom: Animalia
- Phylum: Arthropoda
- Class: Insecta
- Order: Lepidoptera
- Family: Dalceridae
- Genus: Paracraga
- Species: P. argentea

Binomial name
- Paracraga argentea Schaus, 1910

Synonyms
- Minacraga argentea Schaus, 1910; Paracraga cyclophera Dyar, 1914

Species of moth

Paracraga argentea is a moth in the family Dalceridae. It was described by Schaus in 1910. It is found in Mexico, Honduras, Belize, Guatemala, El Salvador, Costa Rica and Panama. The habitat consists of tropical wet, tropical moist, tropical premontane wet, tropical premontane moist, subtropical wet subtropical moist forests.

The length of the forewings is 10–12 mm. Adults are on wing year-round.

The larvae feed on Bucida buceras, Adelia triloba, Prunus cerasifera, Trema micrantha and Uncaria tomentosa.
