= Zikanyrops dubiosa =

Scientific classification
- Kingdom: Animalia
- Phylum: Arthropoda
- Class: Insecta
- Order: Lepidoptera
- Family: Dalceridae
- Genus: Zikanyrops
- Species: Z. dubiosa

Binomial name
- Zikanyrops dubiosa Hopp, 1928

Species of moth

Zikanyrops dubiosa is a moth in the family Dalceridae. It was described by Walter Hopp in 1928. It is found in Bolivia.
