= Acraga sexquicentenaria =

Scientific classification
- Kingdom: Animalia
- Phylum: Arthropoda
- Class: Insecta
- Order: Lepidoptera
- Family: Dalceridae
- Genus: Acraga
- Species: A. sexquicentenaria

Binomial name
- Acraga sexquicentenaria (Orfila, 1961)

Synonyms
- Dalargentina sexquicentenaria Orfila, 1961

Species of moth

Acraga sexquicentenaria is a moth in the family Dalceridae. It was described by Ricardo Orfila in 1961. It is found in southern Brazil, northern Uruguay, and northern Argentina.

The larvae feed on Citrus sinensis. The adults are on wing in January to May, August, October, and November. The forewing length is 9–13 mm (0.35–0.51 in) in males and 15 mm (0.59 in) in females.
