= Minacraga indiscata =

Scientific classification
- Kingdom: Animalia
- Phylum: Arthropoda
- Class: Insecta
- Order: Lepidoptera
- Family: Dalceridae
- Genus: Minacraga
- Species: M. indiscata

Binomial name
- Minacraga indiscata Dyar, 1910

Species of moth

Minacraga indiscata is a moth in the family Dalceridae. It was described by Harrison Gray Dyar Jr. in 1910. It is found in French Guiana, north-western Brazil and Peru. The habitat consists of tropical moist forests.
