= Dalcerides bicolor =

Scientific classification
- Kingdom: Animalia
- Phylum: Arthropoda
- Clade: Pancrustacea
- Class: Insecta
- Order: Lepidoptera
- Family: Dalceridae
- Genus: Dalcerides
- Species: D. bicolor

Binomial name
- Dalcerides bicolor Schaus, 1910

Species of moth

Dalcerides bicolor is a moth in the family Dalceridae. It was described by William Schaus in 1910. It is found in Costa Rica.
