= Acraga amazonica =

Scientific classification
- Domain: Eukaryota
- Kingdom: Animalia
- Phylum: Arthropoda
- Class: Insecta
- Order: Lepidoptera
- Family: Dalceridae
- Genus: Acraga
- Species: A. amazonica

Binomial name
- Acraga amazonica Miller, 1994

Species of moth

Acraga amazonica is a moth of the family Dalceridae. It is found in northern Brazil (Amazon Basin). The habitat consists of tropical moist forests.
