= Acraga obscura =

Scientific classification
- Domain: Eukaryota
- Kingdom: Animalia
- Phylum: Arthropoda
- Class: Insecta
- Order: Lepidoptera
- Family: Dalceridae
- Genus: Acraga
- Species: A. obscura

Binomial name
- Acraga obscura (Schaus, 1896)

Synonyms
- Dalcera obscura Schaus, 1896

Species of moth

Acraga obscura is a moth of the family Dalceridae. It is found in southern Brazil and Uruguay. The habitat consists of warm temperate moist, subtropical wet and subtropical moist forests.
