= Acraga brunnea =

Scientific classification
- Kingdom: Animalia
- Phylum: Arthropoda
- Clade: Pancrustacea
- Class: Insecta
- Order: Lepidoptera
- Family: Dalceridae
- Genus: Acraga
- Species: A. brunnea

Binomial name
- Acraga brunnea Miller, 1994

Species of moth

Acraga brunnea is a moth of the family Dalceridae. It is found in southern Brazil. The habitat consists of subtropical moist and subtropical lower montane wet forests.

The length of the forewings is about 9 mm.
