= Minonoa perbella =

Scientific classification
- Domain: Eukaryota
- Kingdom: Animalia
- Phylum: Arthropoda
- Class: Insecta
- Order: Lepidoptera
- Family: Dalceridae
- Genus: Minonoa
- Species: M. perbella

Binomial name
- Minonoa perbella Schaus, 1905

Synonyms
- Dalcera variegata E. D. Jones, 1908

Species of moth

Minonoa perbella is a moth in the family Dalceridae. It was described by William Schaus in 1905. It is found in southern Brazil. The habitat consists of subtropical wet and warm temperate moist forests.
