= Acraga umbrifera =

Scientific classification
- Domain: Eukaryota
- Kingdom: Animalia
- Phylum: Arthropoda
- Class: Insecta
- Order: Lepidoptera
- Family: Dalceridae
- Genus: Acraga
- Species: A. umbrifera

Binomial name
- Acraga umbrifera (Schaus, 1905)

Synonyms
- Epipinconia umbrifera Schaus, 1905

Species of moth

Acraga umbrifera is a moth in the family Dalceridae. It was described by William Schaus in 1905. It is found in French Guiana. The habitat consists of tropical moist forests.

The length of the forewings is 11–12 mm. Adults are on wing in March and June.
