= Acraga ria =

Scientific classification
- Kingdom: Animalia
- Phylum: Arthropoda
- Class: Insecta
- Order: Lepidoptera
- Family: Dalceridae
- Genus: Acraga
- Species: A. ria

Binomial name
- Acraga ria (Dyar, 1910)

Synonyms
- Anacraga ria Dyar, 1910

Species of moth

Acraga ria is a moth of the family Dalceridae. It is found in southern Brazil and Peru. Records from Panama represent a misidentification. The habitat consists of subtropical moist forests.

The length of the forewings is 8–10 mm. Adults are on wing from November to February.
