= Acraga citrina =

Scientific classification
- Domain: Eukaryota
- Kingdom: Animalia
- Phylum: Arthropoda
- Class: Insecta
- Order: Lepidoptera
- Family: Dalceridae
- Genus: Acraga
- Species: A. citrina

Binomial name
- Acraga citrina (Schaus, 1896)

Synonyms
- Dalcera citrina Schaus, 1896; Epipinconia citrina; Anacraga citrina; Anacraga albescens Hopp, 1928

Species of moth

Acraga citrina is a moth of the family Dalceridae. It is found in Trinidad, Venezuela, Guyana, Suriname, French Guiana and northern Brazil. The habitat consists of tropical moist, tropical dry, tropical premontane moist and tropical premontane dry forests.

The length of the forewings is 9–11 mm for males and 14–15 mm for females. Adults are on wing year-round.

The larvae feed on Melicoccus bijugatus, Ricinus species (including Ricinus communis) and Terminalia catappa.
