= Acraga citrinopsis =

Scientific classification
- Kingdom: Animalia
- Phylum: Arthropoda
- Class: Insecta
- Order: Lepidoptera
- Family: Dalceridae
- Genus: Acraga
- Species: A. citrinopsis

Binomial name
- Acraga citrinopsis (Dyar, 1927)

Synonyms
- Anacraga citrinopsis Dyar, 1927

Species of moth

Acraga citrinopsis is a moth of the family Dalceridae. It is found in Venezuela, Brazil, Peru and Bolivia. The habitat consists of tropical moist, tropical dry, tropical premontane moist, subtropical moist and warm temperate moist or dry forests.

The length of the forewings is 8–10 mm for males and 14 mm for females. Adults are on wing year-round.

The larvae feed on Ricinus communis.
