= Minonoa elvira =

Scientific classification
- Domain: Eukaryota
- Kingdom: Animalia
- Phylum: Arthropoda
- Class: Insecta
- Order: Lepidoptera
- Family: Dalceridae
- Genus: Minonoa
- Species: M. elvira

Binomial name
- Minonoa elvira (Dognin, 1909)

Synonyms
- Acraga elvira Dognin, 1909

Species of moth

Minonoa elvira is a moth in the family Dalceridae. It was described by Paul Dognin in 1909. It is found in Colombia. The habitat consists of tropical lower montane and premontane wet forests.

Adults are on wing from June to August.
