= Paracraga halophora =

Scientific classification
- Kingdom: Animalia
- Phylum: Arthropoda
- Class: Insecta
- Order: Lepidoptera
- Family: Dalceridae
- Genus: Paracraga
- Species: P. halophora

Binomial name
- Paracraga halophora Dyar, 1928

Species of moth

Paracraga halophora is a moth in the family Dalceridae. It was described by Harrison Gray Dyar Jr. in 1928. It is found in Brazil and southern Peru.

The length of the forewings is 11–13 mm for males and 16 mm for females. Adults are on wing in from March to June, in November and December.
