= Dalcerides flavetta =

Scientific classification
- Kingdom: Animalia
- Phylum: Arthropoda
- Clade: Pancrustacea
- Class: Insecta
- Order: Lepidoptera
- Family: Dalceridae
- Genus: Dalcerides
- Species: D. flavetta

Binomial name
- Dalcerides flavetta (Schaus, 1905)

Synonyms
- Acragopsis flavetta Schaus, 1905

Species of moth

Dalcerides flavetta is a moth in the family Dalceridae. It was described by Schaus in 1905. It is found in Venezuela, Guyana, Suriname, French Guiana, Colombia, Ecuador, Peru, Bolivia and northern Brazil. The habitat consists of tropical wet, tropical moist, tropical premontane wet, tropical premontane moist, subtropical moist and tropical dry forests.

The length of the forewings is 7–8.5 mm for males and 10 mm for females. Adults are on wing year-round.
