= Paracraga canalicula =

Scientific classification
- Domain: Eukaryota
- Kingdom: Animalia
- Phylum: Arthropoda
- Class: Insecta
- Order: Lepidoptera
- Family: Dalceridae
- Genus: Paracraga
- Species: P. canalicula

Binomial name
- Paracraga canalicula Dognin, 1910

Species of moth

Paracraga canalicula is a moth in the family Dalceridae. It was described by Paul Dognin in 1910. It is found in Colombia and Peru. The habitat consists of tropical wet, tropical moist and tropical premontane wet forests.

The length of the forewings is 10–11 mm for males and 15 mm for females. Adults are on wing from October to March and in May.
