= Acraga ingenescens =

Scientific classification
- Domain: Eukaryota
- Kingdom: Animalia
- Phylum: Arthropoda
- Class: Insecta
- Order: Lepidoptera
- Family: Dalceridae
- Genus: Acraga
- Species: A. ingenescens

Binomial name
- Acraga ingenescens (Dyar, 1927)

Synonyms
- Anacraga ingenescens Dyar, 1927

Species of moth

Acraga ingenescens is a moth of the family Dalceridae. It is found in Venezuela. The habitat probably consists of tropical lower montane moist forests.

The length of the forewings is about 17 mm (0.669 in).
