= Minacraga plata =

Scientific classification
- Domain: Eukaryota
- Kingdom: Animalia
- Phylum: Arthropoda
- Class: Insecta
- Order: Lepidoptera
- Family: Dalceridae
- Genus: Minacraga
- Species: M. plata

Binomial name
- Minacraga plata S.E. Miller, 1994

Species of moth

Minacraga plata is a moth in the family Dalceridae. It was described by S.E. Miller in 1994. It is found in Costa Rica and Panama. The habitat consists of tropical moist, tropical premontane wet and tropical premontane moist forests.
