= Dalcerides radians =

Scientific classification
- Domain: Eukaryota
- Kingdom: Animalia
- Phylum: Arthropoda
- Class: Insecta
- Order: Lepidoptera
- Family: Dalceridae
- Genus: Dalcerides
- Species: D. radians

Binomial name
- Dalcerides radians (Hopp, 1921)

Synonyms
- Acragopsis radians Hopp, 1921

Species of moth

Dalcerides radians is a moth in the family Dalceridae. It was described by Walter Hopp in 1921. It is found in southern Brazil. The habitat consists of subtropical wet, subtropical moist and warm temperate moist forests.

The length of the forewings is 7–10 mm for males and 10–11 mm for females. Adults are on wing from September to May.
