= Acraga beebei =

Scientific classification
- Domain: Eukaryota
- Kingdom: Animalia
- Phylum: Arthropoda
- Class: Insecta
- Order: Lepidoptera
- Family: Dalceridae
- Genus: Acraga
- Species: A. beebei

Binomial name
- Acraga beebei Miller, 1994

Species of moth

Acraga beebei is a moth of the family Dalceridae. It is found in northern Venezuela. The habitat consists of tropical premontane moist forests.
