= Acraga boliviana =

Scientific classification
- Domain: Eukaryota
- Kingdom: Animalia
- Phylum: Arthropoda
- Class: Insecta
- Order: Lepidoptera
- Family: Dalceridae
- Genus: Acraga
- Species: A. boliviana

Binomial name
- Acraga boliviana Hopp, 1921

Synonyms
- Acraga cosmia var. boliviana Hopp, 1921

Species of moth

Acraga boliviana is a moth in the family Dalceridae. It was described by Walter Hopp in 1921. It is found in Bolivia and western Brazil. The habitat consists of subtropical moist forests.

Adults have been recorded on wing in July.
