= Minacraga hyalina =

Scientific classification
- Domain: Eukaryota
- Kingdom: Animalia
- Phylum: Arthropoda
- Class: Insecta
- Order: Lepidoptera
- Family: Dalceridae
- Genus: Minacraga
- Species: M. hyalina

Binomial name
- Minacraga hyalina S.E. Miller, 1994

Species of moth

Minacraga hyalina is a moth in the family Dalceridae. It was described by S.E. Miller in 1994. It is found in Suriname, French Guiana, Peru and northern Brazil (Amazon Basin). The habitat consists of tropical moist forests.

The length of the forewings is 12–15 mm.
