= Acraga leberna =

Scientific classification
- Kingdom: Animalia
- Phylum: Arthropoda
- Class: Insecta
- Order: Lepidoptera
- Family: Dalceridae
- Genus: Acraga
- Species: A. leberna

Binomial name
- Acraga leberna (Druce, 1890)

Synonyms
- Dalcera leberna Druce, 1890; Acraga arcifera Dyar, 1910

Species of moth

Acraga leberna is a moth in the family Dalceridae. It was described by Herbert Druce in 1890. It is found in Panama and in northern half of South America (Colombia, Venezuela, Guyana, Suriname, French Guiana, Ecuador, northern Brazil (Amazon Basin), Peru and Bolivia).

The length of the forewings is 11–15 mm for males and 16–19 mm for females. Adults are on wing year-round.
