= Minacraga itatiaia =

Scientific classification
- Domain: Eukaryota
- Kingdom: Animalia
- Phylum: Arthropoda
- Class: Insecta
- Order: Lepidoptera
- Family: Dalceridae
- Genus: Minacraga
- Species: M. itatiaia

Binomial name
- Minacraga itatiaia S.E. Miller, 1994

Species of moth

Minacraga itatiaia is a moth in the family Dalceridae. It was described by S.E. Miller in 1994. It is found in southern Brazil. The habitat consists of subtropical wet, subtropical lower montane moist and warm temperate moist forests.

The length of the forewings is 14–15 mm for males and 19 mm for females. Adults are on wing in March and April.

== Etymology ==
The species name refers to Pico do Itatiaia, the type locality.
