= Paracraga necoda =

Scientific classification
- Domain: Eukaryota
- Kingdom: Animalia
- Phylum: Arthropoda
- Class: Insecta
- Order: Lepidoptera
- Family: Dalceridae
- Genus: Paracraga
- Species: P. necoda

Binomial name
- Paracraga necoda (H. Druce, 1901)

Synonyms
- Dalcera necoda H. Druce, 1901

Species of moth

Paracraga necoda is a moth in the family Dalceridae. It was described by Herbert Druce in 1901. It is found in Colombia, Ecuador and Venezuela.

The length of the forewings is 9–11 mm for males and 16 mm for females. Adults are on wing in March, June and July.
