= Acraga neblina =

Scientific classification
- Domain: Eukaryota
- Kingdom: Animalia
- Phylum: Arthropoda
- Class: Insecta
- Order: Lepidoptera
- Family: Dalceridae
- Genus: Acraga
- Species: A. neblina

Binomial name
- Acraga neblina Miller, 1994

Species of moth

Acraga neblina is a moth of the family Dalceridae. It is found in Venezuela. The habitat consists of tropical premontane wet and tropical lower montane rain forests, where it is found at high altitudes.

The length of the forewings is 14–17 mm. Adults are on wing in May, August and December.
