= Acraga ciliata =

Scientific classification
- Kingdom: Animalia
- Phylum: Arthropoda
- Class: Insecta
- Order: Lepidoptera
- Family: Dalceridae
- Genus: Acraga
- Species: A. ciliata

Binomial name
- Acraga ciliata Walker, 1855

Species of moth

Acraga ciliata is a moth of the family Dalceridae. It is found in Jamaica. It is found in a wide range of habitats, ranging from dry to wet and from sea level to 1,300 meters.

The length of the forewings is 9.5–12 mm for males and 14 mm for females. Adults are on wing year-round.
