= Acraga hoppiana =

Scientific classification
- Domain: Eukaryota
- Kingdom: Animalia
- Phylum: Arthropoda
- Class: Insecta
- Order: Lepidoptera
- Family: Dalceridae
- Genus: Acraga
- Species: A. hoppiana

Binomial name
- Acraga hoppiana Miller, 1994

Species of moth

Acraga hoppiana is a moth of the family Dalceridae. It is found in Colombia and Ecuador. The habitat consists of tropical wet, Tropical lower montane dry and possibly in tropical premontane rain forests.

The length of the forewings is 9–10 mm.
