= Minacraga aenea =

Scientific classification
- Domain: Eukaryota
- Kingdom: Animalia
- Phylum: Arthropoda
- Class: Insecta
- Order: Lepidoptera
- Family: Dalceridae
- Genus: Minacraga
- Species: M. aenea

Binomial name
- Minacraga aenea Hopp, 1921

Species of moth

Minacraga aenea is a moth in the family Dalceridae. It was described by Walter Hopp in 1921. It is found in south-eastern Brazil. The habitat consists of subtropical wet and moist forests.
