= Acraga ampela =

Scientific classification
- Domain: Eukaryota
- Kingdom: Animalia
- Phylum: Arthropoda
- Class: Insecta
- Order: Lepidoptera
- Family: Dalceridae
- Genus: Acraga
- Species: A. ampela

Binomial name
- Acraga ampela (H. Druce, 1890)

Synonyms
- Dalcera ampela H. Druce, 1890; Acraga cosmia Dognin, 1911

Species of moth

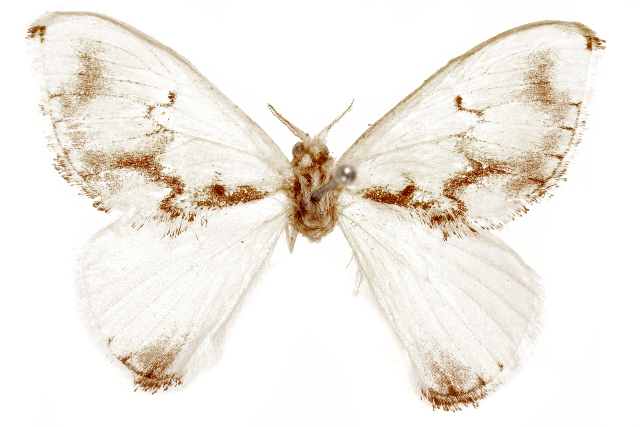
A specimen of Acraga ampela.

Acraga ampela is a moth in the family Dalceridae. It was described by Herbert Druce in 1890. It has been collected in Ecuador, Peru and Colombia.
