= Lycus sanguinipennis =

Scientific classification
- Domain: Eukaryota
- Kingdom: Animalia
- Phylum: Arthropoda
- Class: Insecta
- Order: Coleoptera
- Suborder: Polyphaga
- Infraorder: Elateriformia
- Family: Lycidae
- Genus: Lycus
- Species: L. sanguinipennis

Binomial name
- Lycus sanguinipennis Say, 1823

Species of beetle

Lycus sanguinipennis is a species of net-winged beetle in the family Lycidae. It is found in North America.

There are currently 26 known Lucus sanguinipennis beetles:

12 in Arizona, United States

2 in New Mexico, United States

7 in Colorado, United States

2 in Puebla, Mexico
