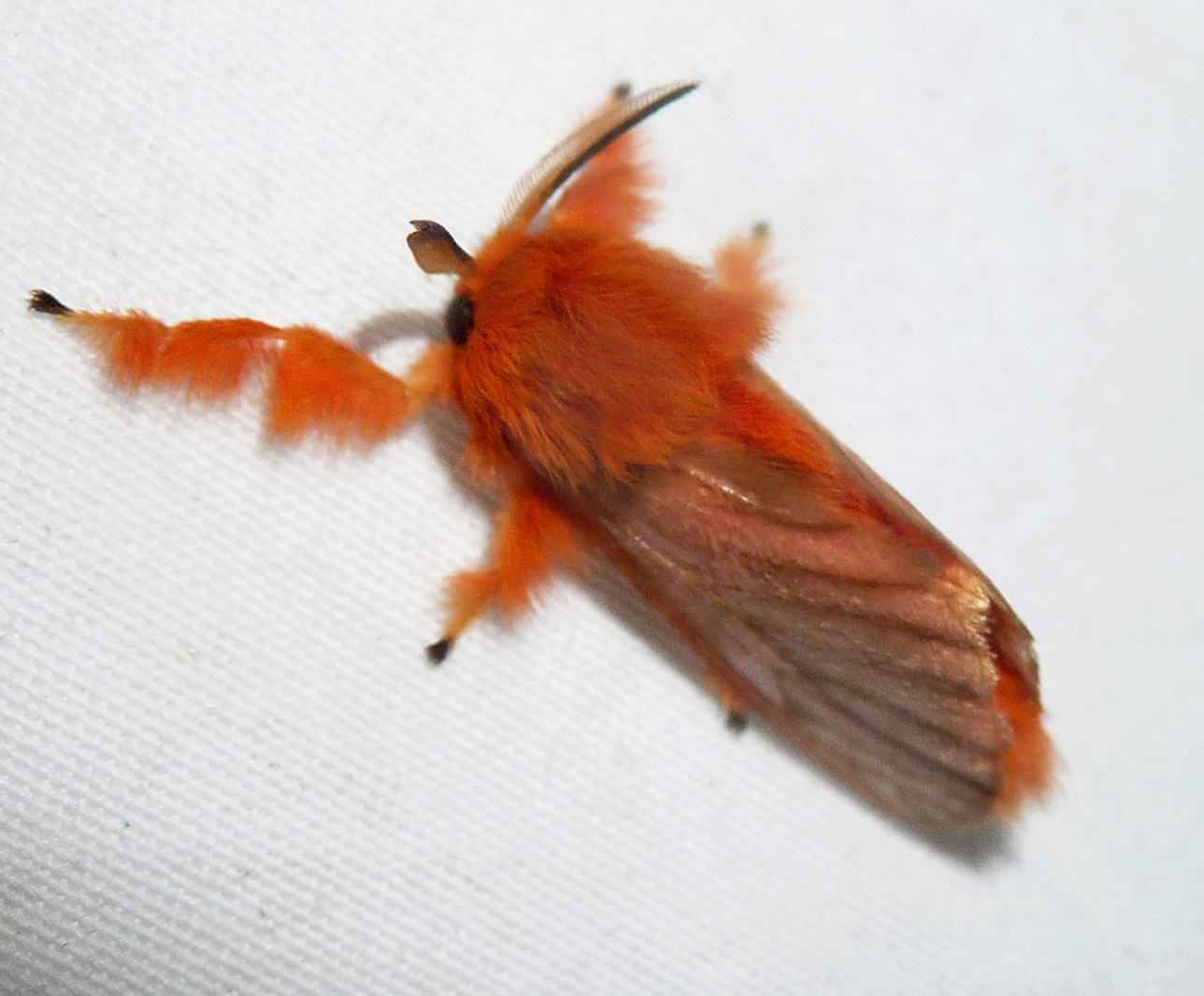
- adult

Scientific classification
- Kingdom: Animalia
- Phylum: Arthropoda
- Class: Insecta
- Order: Lepidoptera
- Family: Dalceridae
- Genus: Acraga
- Species: A. moorei

Binomial name
- Acraga moorei Dyar, 1898

Synonyms
- Pinconia ochracea Moore, 1882 (preocc. by Walker, 1855)

= Acraga moorei =

Species of moth

Acraga moorei, the tangerine furry-legs, is a moth of the family Dalceridae. It is found in Venezuela, Colombia, Brazil, Ecuador, Peru, Bolivia, Paraguay and northern Argentina.

The larvae feed on Eriobotrya japonica and Coffea arabica.
