= Zikanyrops =

Scientific classification
- Kingdom: Animalia
- Phylum: Arthropoda
- Class: Insecta
- Order: Lepidoptera
- Family: Dalceridae
- Subfamily: Acraginae
- Genus: Zikanyrops; Hopp, 1928

Genus of moths

Zikanyrops is a genus of moths of the family Dalceridae.

== Species ==
- Zikanyrops dubiosa Hopp, 1928
- Zikanyrops sparsa Hopp, 1928
