= Minacraga argentata =

Scientific classification
- Domain: Eukaryota
- Kingdom: Animalia
- Phylum: Arthropoda
- Class: Insecta
- Order: Lepidoptera
- Family: Dalceridae
- Genus: Minacraga
- Species: M. argentata

Binomial name
- Minacraga argentata Hopp, 1922

Synonyms
- Minacragides argentata

Species of moth

Minacraga argentata is a moth in the family Dalceridae. It was described by Walter Hopp in 1922. It is found in Colombia, eastern Brazil and Peru. The habitat consists of tropical wet, moist and premontane wet forests.
