= Dalcerides =

Scientific classification
- Kingdom: Animalia
- Phylum: Arthropoda
- Clade: Pancrustacea
- Class: Insecta
- Order: Lepidoptera
- Family: Dalceridae
- Subfamily: Acraginae
- Genus: Dalcerides; Neumoegen and Dyar, 1893

Synonyms
- Acragopsis Dyar, 1905

Genus of moths

Dalcerides is a genus of moths of the family Dalceridae. It was described by Berthold Neumoegen and Harrison Gray Dyar Jr. in 1893.

== Species ==
- Dalcerides flavetta group:
  - Dalcerides flavetta (Schaus, 1905)
  - Dalcerides rebella (Schaus, 1911)
  - Dalcerides chirma (Schaus, 1920)
  - Dalcerides radians (Hopp, 1921)
  - Dalcerides dulciola (Dyar, 1914)
  - Dalcerides mesoa (Druce, 1887)
  - Dalcerides nana (Dognin, 1920)
  - Dalcerides sofia (Dyar, 1910)
- Dalcerides ingenita group:
  - Dalcerides ingenita Edwards, 1882
  - Dalcerides bicolor Schaus, 1910
  - Dalcerides alba (Druce, 1887)
