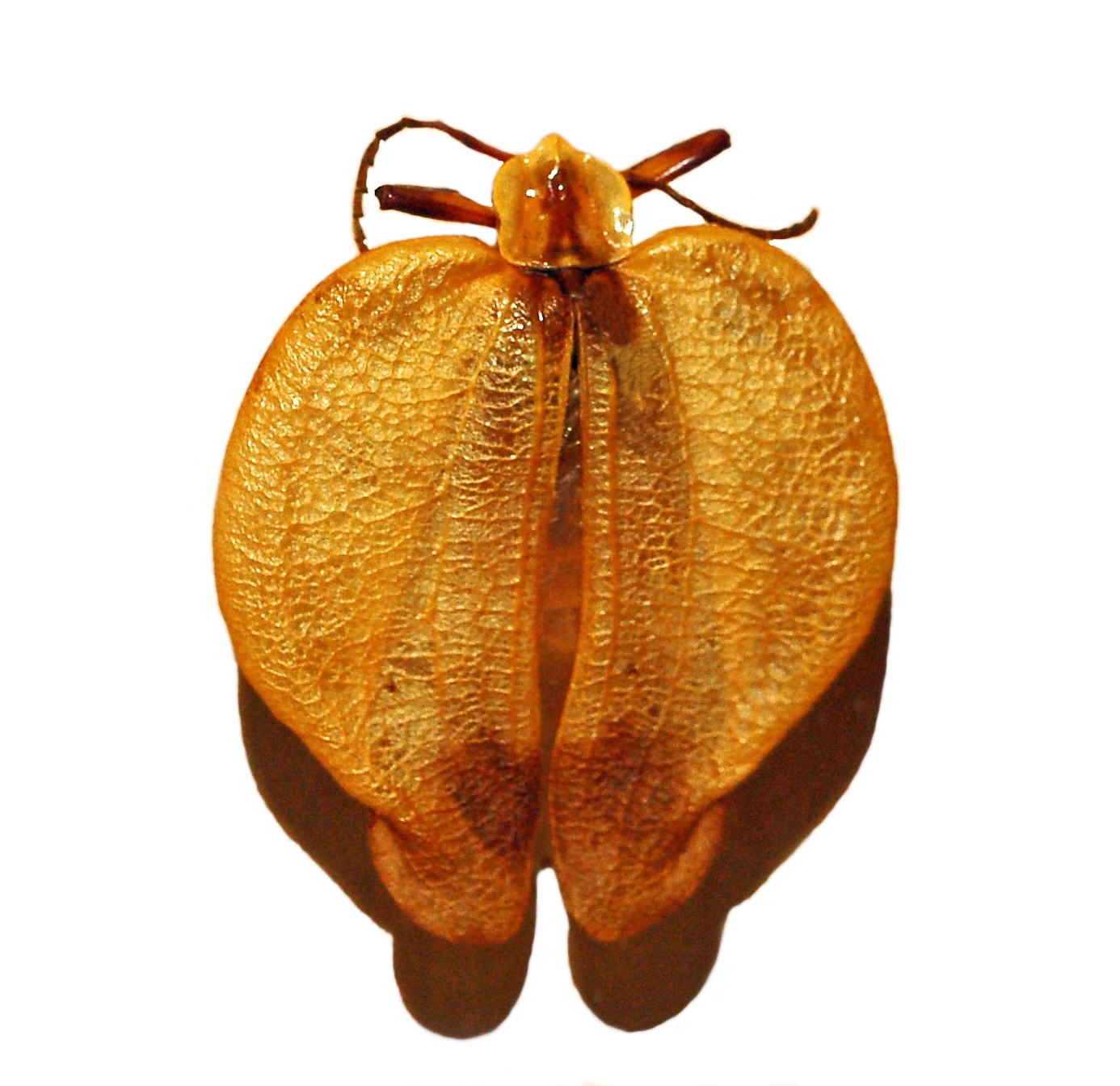
- Male L. trabeatus from Eritrea

Scientific classification
- Domain: Eukaryota
- Kingdom: Animalia
- Phylum: Arthropoda
- Class: Insecta
- Order: Coleoptera
- Suborder: Polyphaga
- Infraorder: Elateriformia
- Family: Lycidae
- Subfamily: Lycinae
- Tribe: Lycini
- Genus: Lycus; Fabricius, 1787

Synonyms
- Alycus Rafinesque, 1815

= Lycus (beetle) =

Genus of beetles

Lycus is the type genus of net-winged beetles in the Lycidae family and the tribe Lycini: found in Africa and the Americas.

== List of species ==
- Lycus ampliatus (Fåhraeus, 1851)
- Lycus arizonensis Green, 1949
- Lycus dentipes Dalmann, 1817
- Lycus fernandezi Dugés, 1878
- Lycus foliaceus Dalman, 1817
- Lycus fulvellus LeConte, 1881
- Lycus icarus Bourgeois, 1889
- Lycus lecontei Green, 1949
- Lycus loripes Chevrolat, 1835
- Lycus minutus Green, 1949
- Lycus palliatus (Fabricius, 1775)
- Lycus rostratellus Bourgeois
- Lycus rostratus (Linnaeus, 1767)
- Lycus rubescens Schaeffer, 1908
- Lycus sagittatus Green, 1949
- Lycus sanguineus Gorham, 1884
- Lycus sanguinipennis Say, 1823
- Lycus simulans Schaeffer, 1911
- Lycus subtrabeatus
- Lycus trabeatus Guérin-Méneville, 1835
- Lycus vittatus Gahan, 1909
