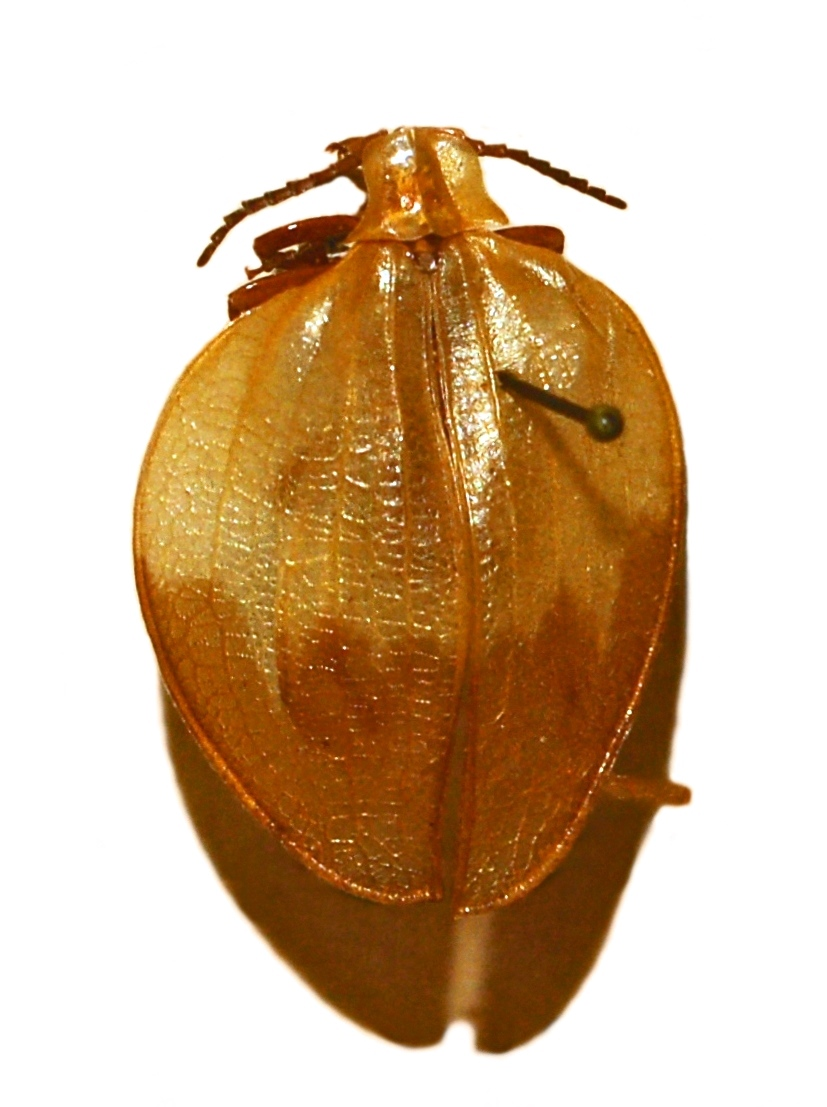
- Museum specimen of a male from Guinea-Bissau

Scientific classification
- Kingdom: Animalia
- Phylum: Arthropoda
- Class: Insecta
- Order: Coleoptera
- Suborder: Polyphaga
- Infraorder: Elateriformia
- Family: Lycidae
- Genus: Lycus
- Species: L. foliaceus

Binomial name
- Lycus foliaceus Dalman, 1817

= Lycus foliaceus =

Species of beetle

Lycus foliaceus is a species of beetle belonging to the Lycidae family.

== Description ==
Males of the species have expanded elytra, with prominent shoulders and a blackish apex. Those of females are comparatively narrow.

== Distribution ==
This species occurs in Sierra Leone and Guinea-Bissau.
