= Dalcerides dulciola =

Scientific classification
- Kingdom: Animalia
- Phylum: Arthropoda
- Class: Insecta
- Order: Lepidoptera
- Family: Dalceridae
- Genus: Dalcerides
- Species: D. dulciola

Binomial name
- Dalcerides dulciola (Dyar, 1914)

Synonyms
- Anacraga dulciola Dyar, 1914; Acraga dulciola

Species of moth

Dalcerides dulciola is a moth in the family Dalceridae. It was described by Harrison Gray Dyar Jr. in 1914. It is found in southern Mexico, Costa Rica, Panama, northern Ecuador and northern Venezuela. The habitat consists of tropical wet, tropical moist, tropical premontane wet and tropical premontane rain forests.

The length of the forewings is 6–9 mm. Adults are on wing year round.
