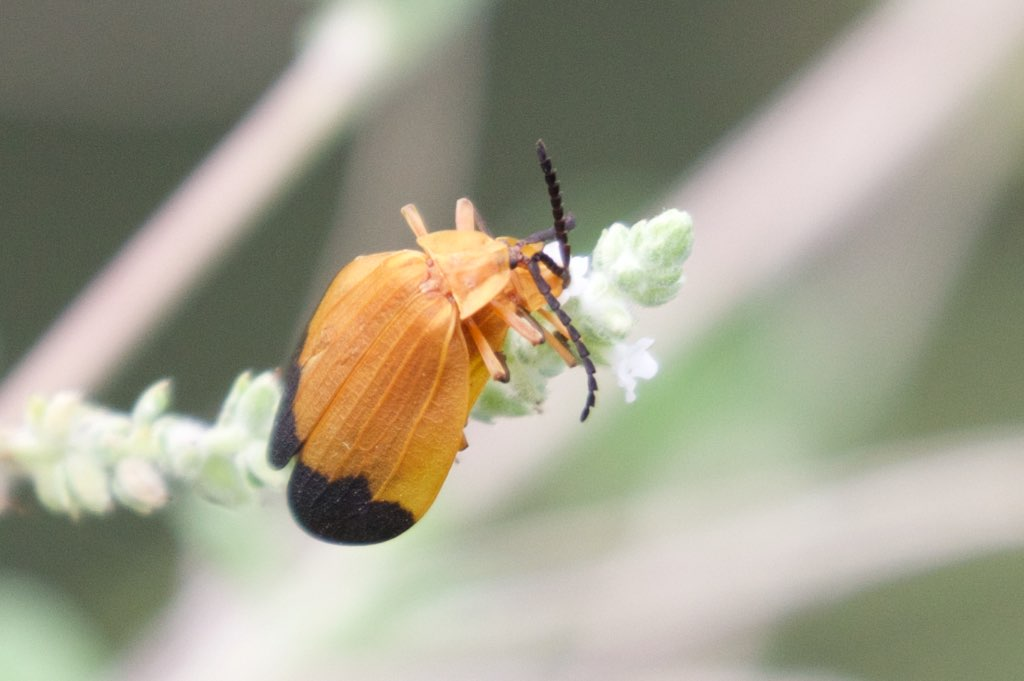

Scientific classification
- Domain: Eukaryota
- Kingdom: Animalia
- Phylum: Arthropoda
- Class: Insecta
- Order: Coleoptera
- Suborder: Polyphaga
- Infraorder: Elateriformia
- Family: Lycidae
- Genus: Lycus
- Species: L. arizonensis

Binomial name
- Lycus arizonensis Green, 1949

= Lycus arizonensis =

Species of beetle

Lycus arizonensis is a species of net-winged beetle in the family Lycidae. It is found in North America.

== Description ==
Members of this species are amber in color with black-tipped elytra. Males of this species tend to be slightly smaller than the females.

== Distribution ==
This species typically occurs in the Southwestern United States.
