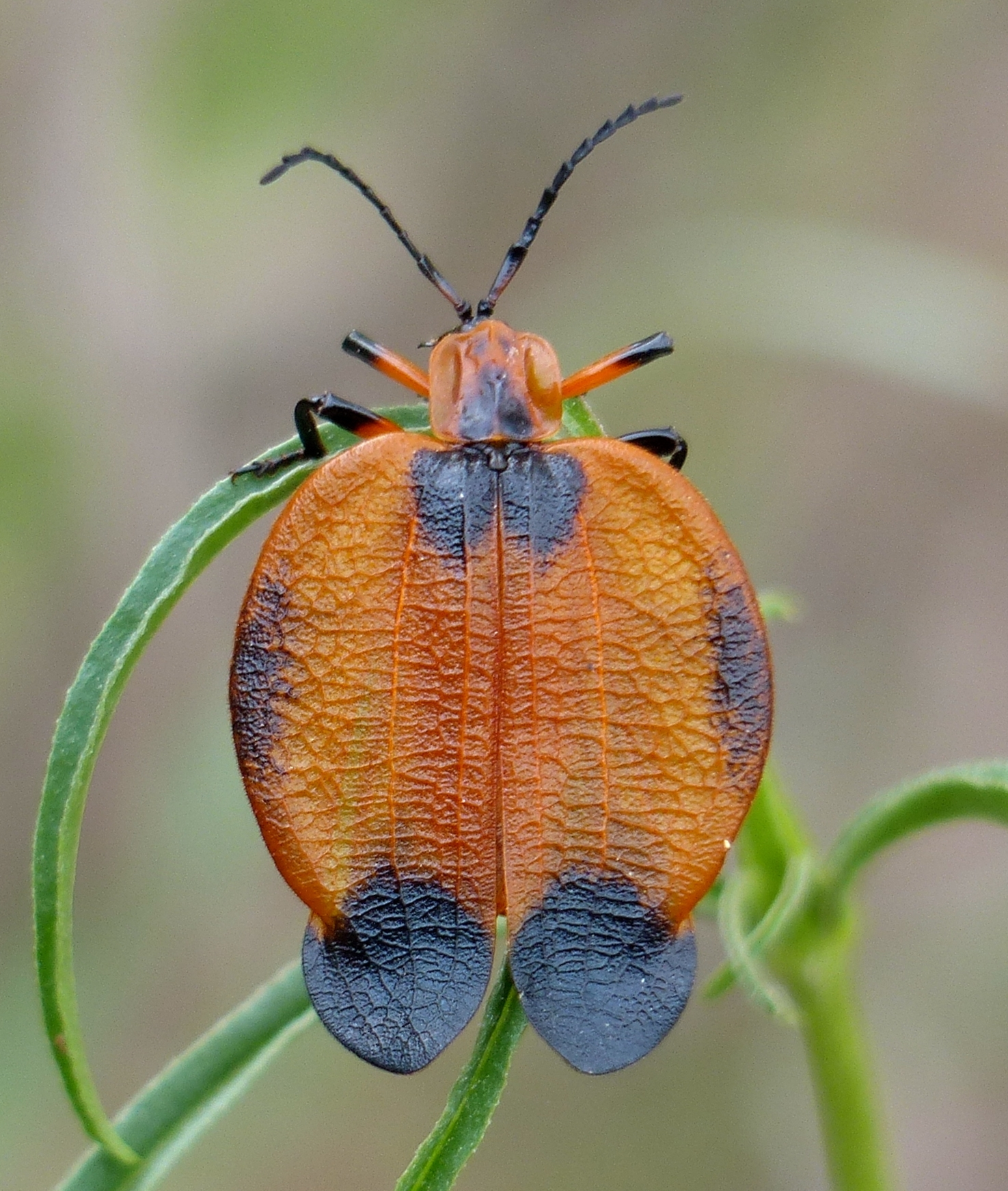
- In eastern South Africa

Scientific classification
- Kingdom: Animalia
- Phylum: Arthropoda
- Clade: Pancrustacea
- Class: Insecta
- Order: Coleoptera
- Suborder: Polyphaga
- Infraorder: Elateriformia
- Family: Lycidae
- Genus: Lycus
- Species: L. trabeatus

Binomial name
- Lycus trabeatus Guérin-Méneville, 1835

Synonyms
- Chlamydolycus trabeatus

= Lycus trabeatus =

Species of beetle

Lycus trabeatus, the tailed net-winged beetle, is a species of beetle in the family Lycidae, which is native to the eastern, southern Afrotropics and Arabian Peninsula. They are diurnal, aposematic insects. Adults feed on various flowers and their nectar, while larvae live under tree bark, in dead wood, or in detritus where they may live on fungi.

== Range and habitat ==
It is known to occur in Botswana, Eritrea, Ethiopia, the DRC, Tanzania, Namibia, Oman and South Africa. It inhabits subtropical forests, savannahs and grasslands. Seen in Kenya at Meru National Park and Lewa Wildlife Conservancy in January 2026.

Seen in Cape Coast, Ghana in November 2026.

== Description ==
Lycus trabeatus reaches a length of about 22–31 millimetres (0.87–1.22 in). The pronotum has a black center and orange edges. The elytra are black at their bases, on the apical lobes, and sometimes along the dilated edges. Elytra are variable in shape, from widely expanded with a constriction towards the apical lobe, to intermediate or slender. The black antennae are mildly serrate. Femora are orange and the lower legs are black.

== Subspecies ==
There are two subspecies:

- Lycus trabeatus trabeatus

Range: eastern and southern Afrotropics
Description: Female's total length about 22 mm, pronotum 4 mm x 4 mm, elytron 18 mm long, dilated laterally, narrowing towards apical lobe.

- Lycus trabeatus matojoi

Range: southern highlands of Tanzania
Description: Female's total length about 18 mm, pronotum 3 mm x 3 mm, elytron 15 x 4 mm.

== Gallery ==
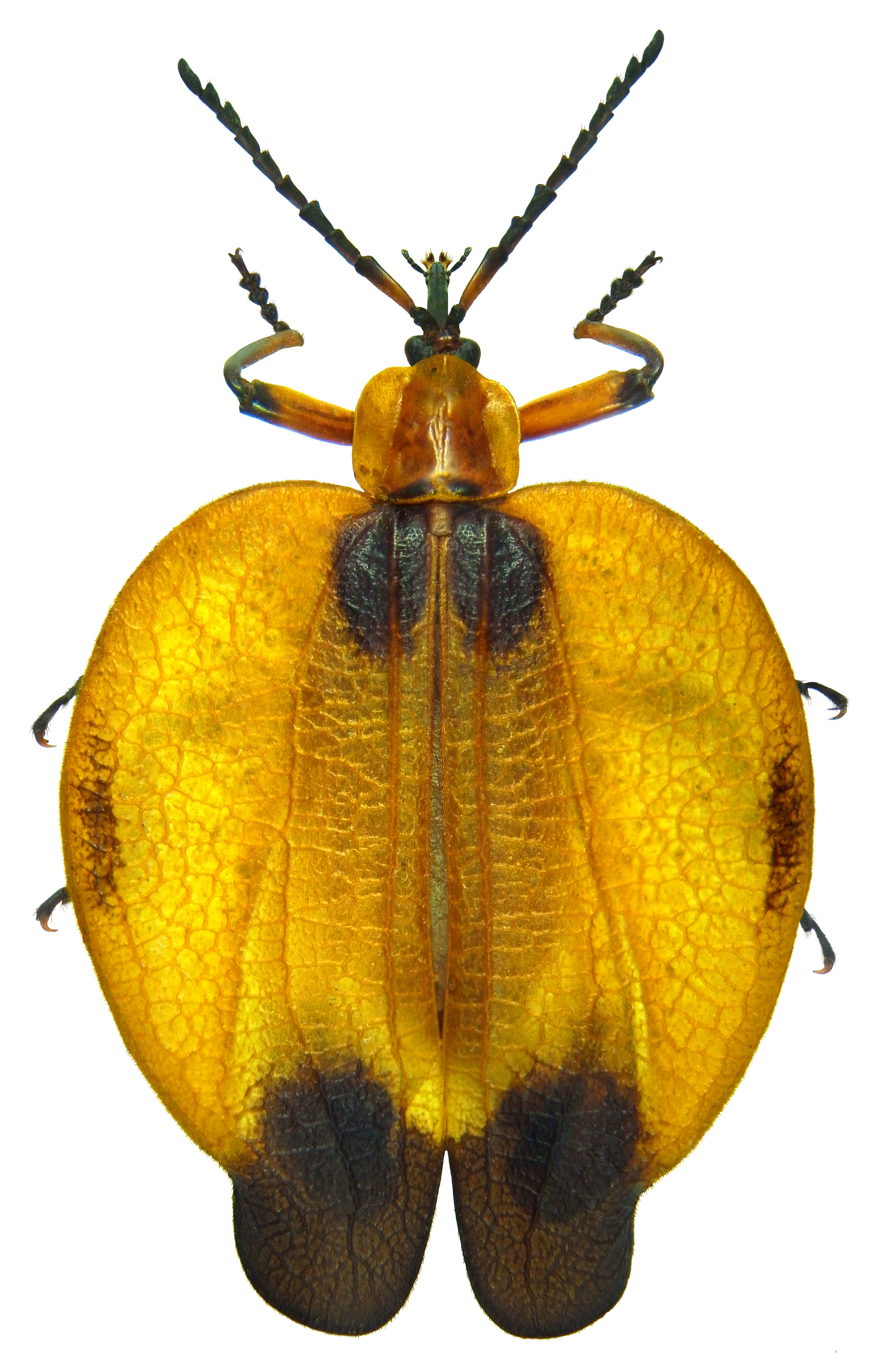
specimen from Namibia

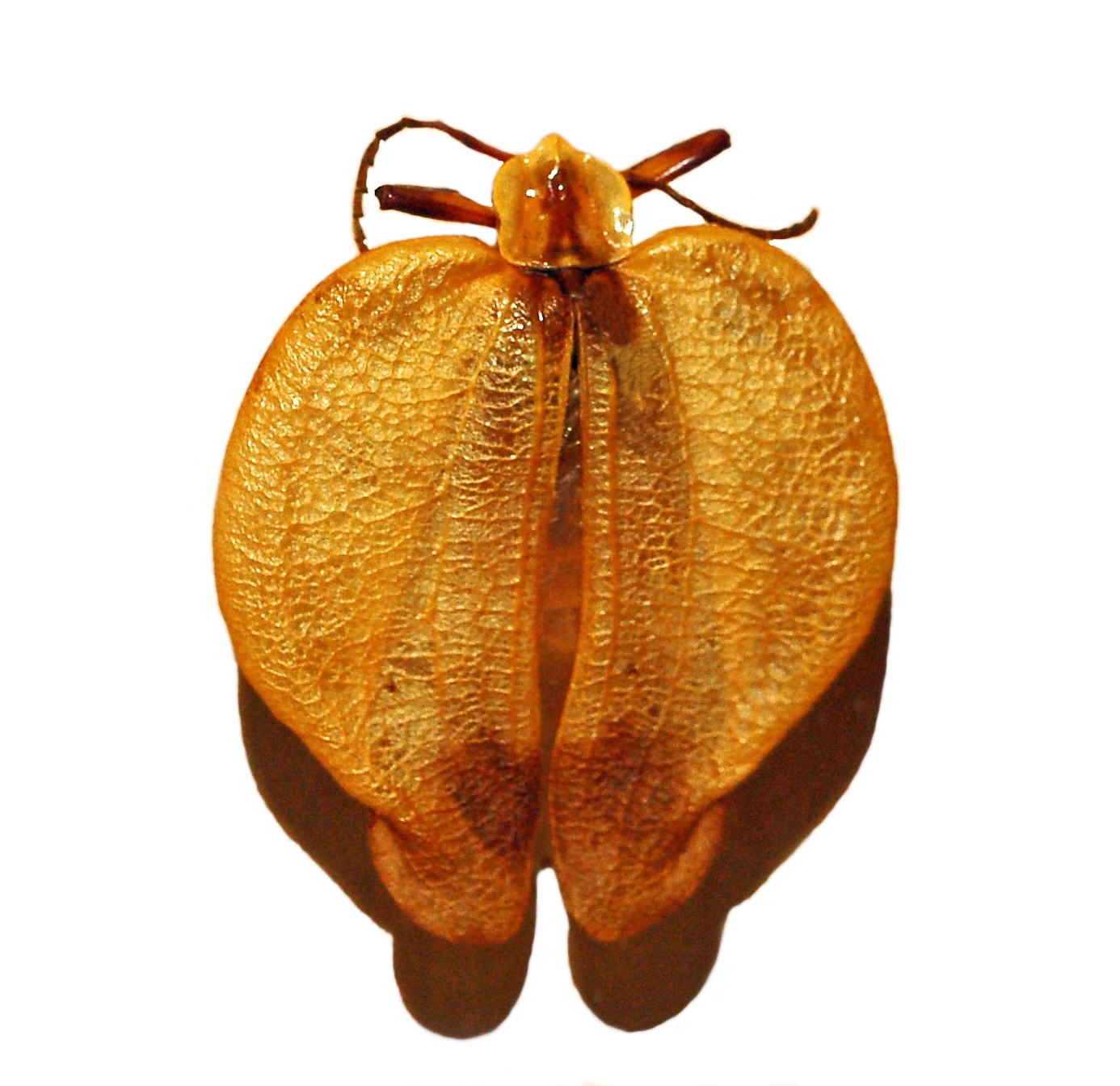
specimen from Eritrea

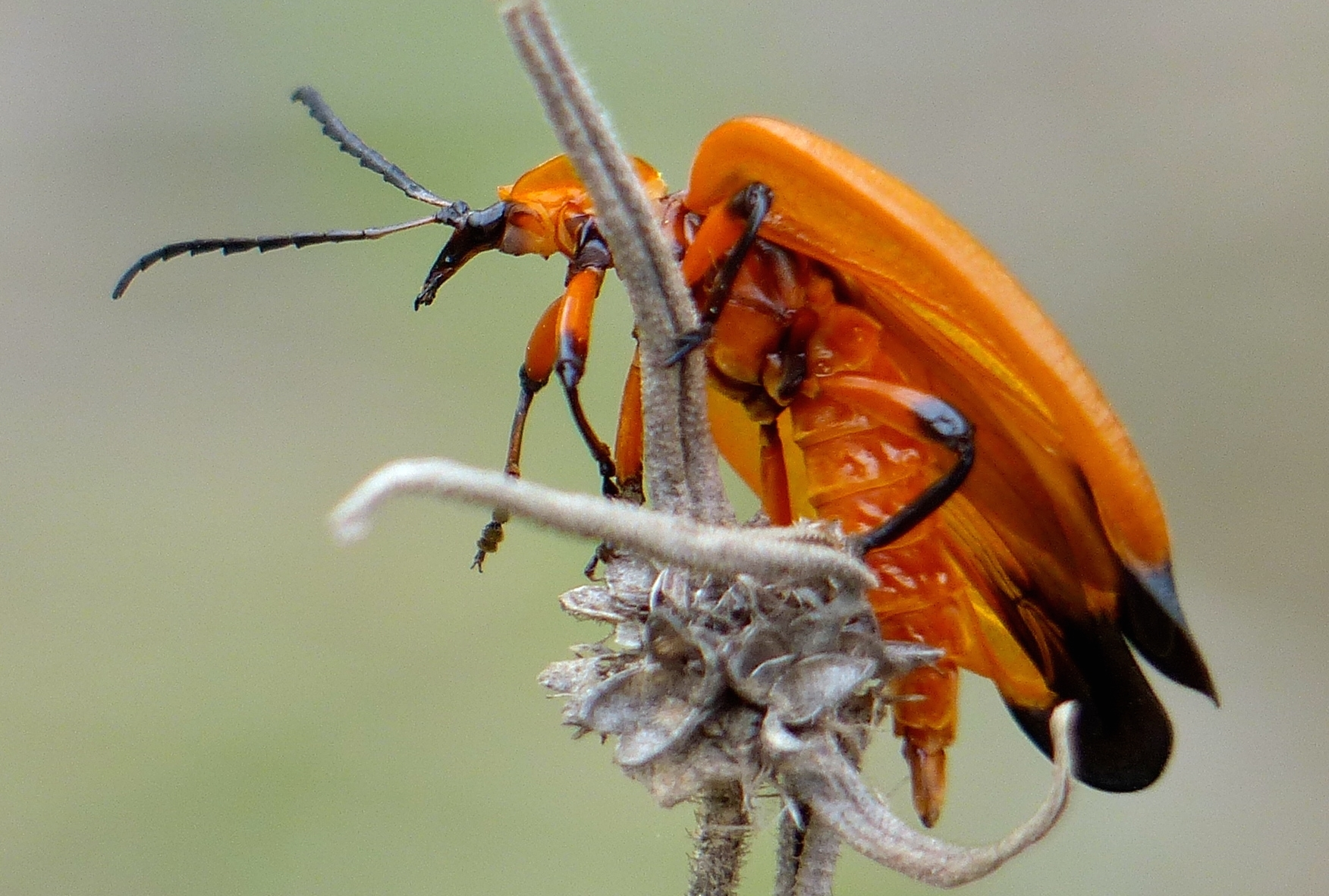
lateral view

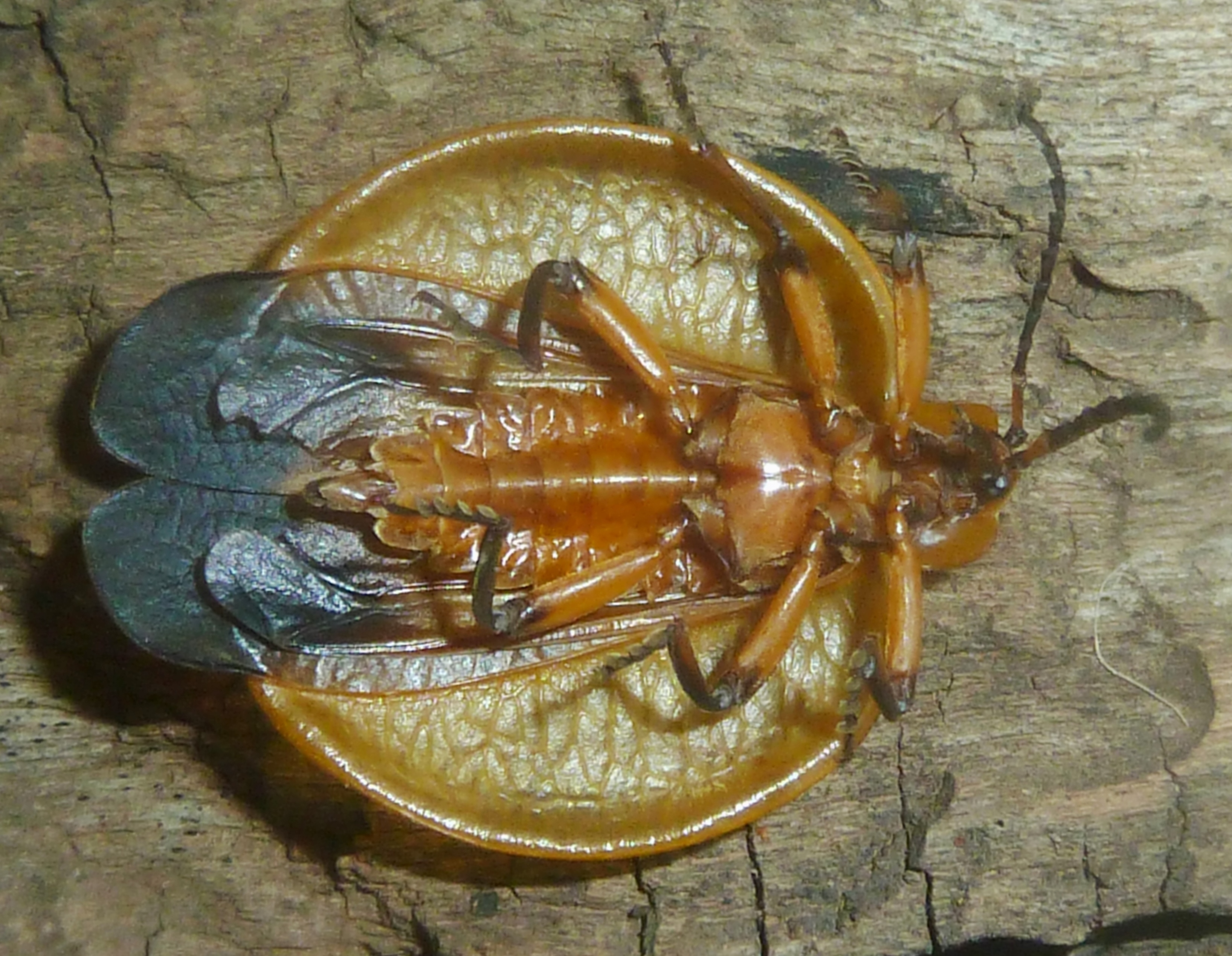
ventral aspect
