= Lycus fulvellus =

Scientific classification
- Kingdom: Animalia
- Phylum: Arthropoda
- Class: Insecta
- Order: Coleoptera
- Suborder: Polyphaga
- Infraorder: Elateriformia
- Family: Lycidae
- Genus: Lycus
- Species: L. fulvellus

Binomial name
- Lycus fulvellus LeConte, 1881

Species of beetle

Lycus fulvellus is a species of net-winged beetle in the family Lycidae. It is found in North America.
