= Dalcerides nana =

Scientific classification
- Kingdom: Animalia
- Phylum: Arthropoda
- Class: Insecta
- Order: Lepidoptera
- Family: Dalceridae
- Genus: Dalcerides
- Species: D. nana

Binomial name
- Dalcerides nana (Dognin, 1920)

Synonyms
- Anacraga nana Dognin, 1920

Species of moth

Dalcerides nana is a moth in the family Dalceridae. It was described by Paul Dognin in 1920. It is found in southern Brazil. The habitat consists of subtropical wet and subtropical moist forests.

The forewing length is 7–8 mm (0.28–0.31 in) for males.
