= Oroya aurora =

Scientific classification
- Kingdom: Animalia
- Phylum: Arthropoda
- Clade: Pancrustacea
- Class: Insecta
- Order: Lepidoptera
- Family: Dalceridae
- Genus: Oroya; Miller, 1994
- Species: O. aurora

Binomial name
- Oroya aurora Miller, 1994

Species of moth

Oroya aurora is a moth in the family Dalceridae, and the only species in the genus Oroya. Both the genus and the species were first described by Scott E. Miller in 1994. It is found in southern Peru and adjacent Bolivia. The habitat consists of tropical premontane wet, tropical premontane moist and subtropical (lower) montane wet forests.

The length of the forewings is 9–10 mm.
