= Minacraga disconitens =

Scientific classification
- Domain: Eukaryota
- Kingdom: Animalia
- Phylum: Arthropoda
- Class: Insecta
- Order: Lepidoptera
- Family: Dalceridae
- Genus: Minacraga
- Species: M. disconitens

Binomial name
- Minacraga disconitens Schaus, 1905

Species of moth

Minacraga disconitens is a moth in the family Dalceridae. It was described by Schaus in 1905. It is found in Venezuela, Trinidad, Guyana, Suriname, French Guiana, Brazil, eastern Peru and Bolivia. The habitat consists of tropical moist, tropical premontane wet, tropical premontane moist, subtropical moist and warm temperate moist or dry forests.
