= Dalcerides mesoa =

Scientific classification
- Domain: Eukaryota
- Kingdom: Animalia
- Phylum: Arthropoda
- Class: Insecta
- Order: Lepidoptera
- Family: Dalceridae
- Genus: Dalcerides
- Species: D. mesoa

Binomial name
- Dalcerides mesoa (H. Druce, 1887)

Synonyms
- Dalcera mesoa H. Druce, 1887; Acraga mesoa; Anacraga gugelmanni Dyar, 1916; Acraga gugelmanni

Species of moth

Dalcerides mesoa is a moth in the family Dalceridae. It was described by Herbert Druce in 1887. It is found in southern Mexico, Guatemala, Costa Rica, Panama, Colombia, Venezuela and Ecuador.

The length of the forewings is 6–8 mm for males and 8–11 mm for females. Adults are on wing year round.

The larvae feed on Paullinia bracteosa.
