= Dalcerina =

Scientific classification
- Kingdom: Animalia
- Phylum: Arthropoda
- Class: Insecta
- Order: Lepidoptera
- Family: Dalceridae
- Genus: Dalcerina; Dyar, 1898
- Species: D. tijucana

Binomial name
- Dalcerina tijucana (Schaus, 1892)

Synonyms
- Zadalcera Dyar, 1910; Dalcera tijucana Schaus, 1892; Dalmera fumata Schaus, 1894; Dalcera fumata; Zadalcera fumata; Zadalcera arhathodota Dyar, 1910; Zadalcera muncia Dyar, 1923; Zadalcera dierrhyeoa Dyar, 1923; Zadalcera dierrhoea

Genus of moths

Dalcerina tijucana is a moth in the family Dalceridae, and the only species in the genus Dalcerina. It was described by Schaus in 1892. It is found in Panama, eastern Peru, Brazil, Paraguay and northern Argentina.

The length of the forewings is 14–20 mm for males and 20–24 mm for females.

The larvae feed on Citrus sinensis, Eucalyptus saligna and Ouratea species.
