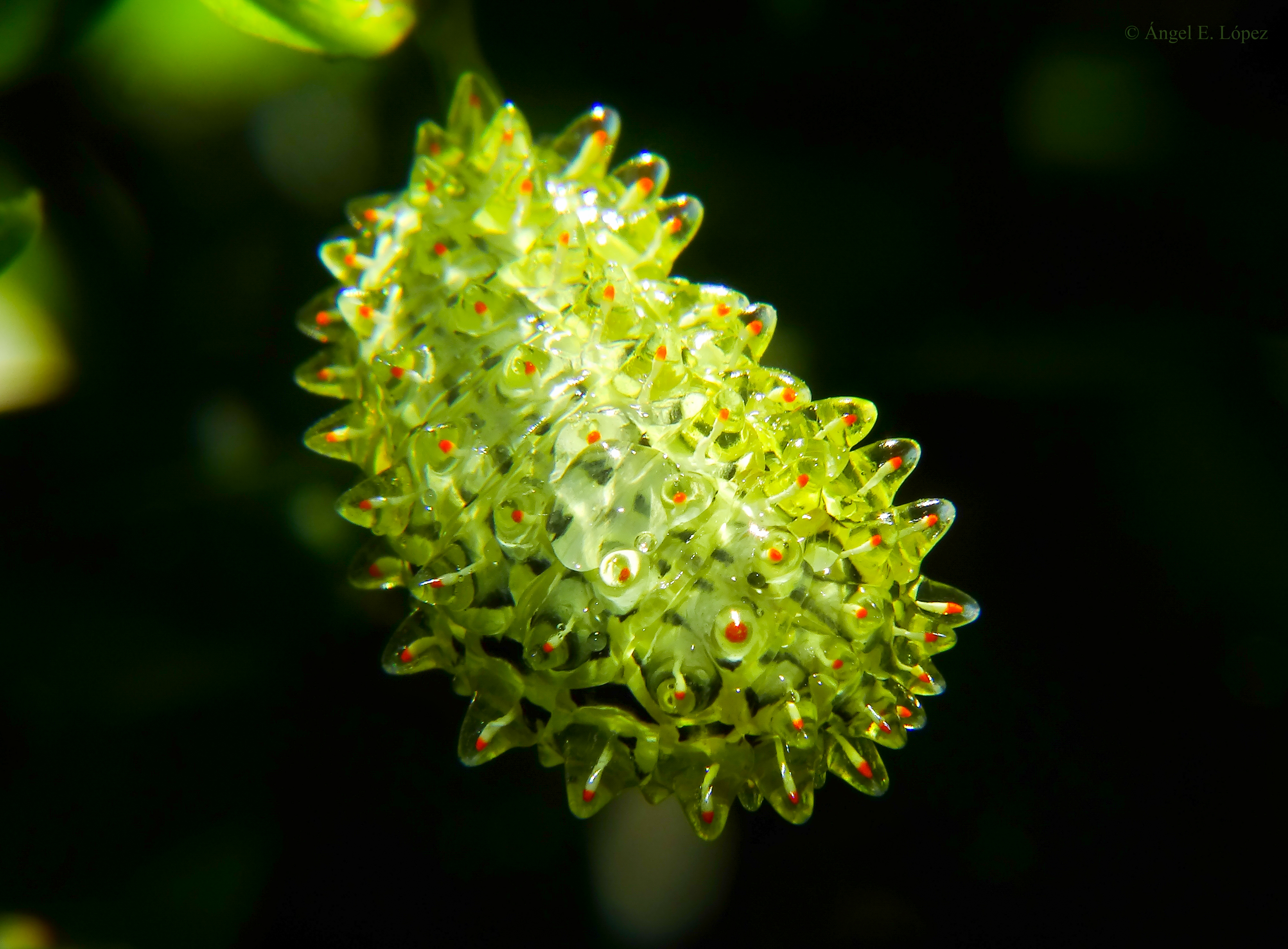
- Jewel caterpillar

Scientific classification
- Domain: Eukaryota
- Kingdom: Animalia
- Phylum: Arthropoda
- Class: Insecta
- Order: Lepidoptera
- Family: Dalceridae
- Genus: Acraga
- Species: A. coa

Binomial name
- Acraga coa (Schaus, 1892)

Synonyms
- Pinconia coa (Schaus, 1892); Acraga moribunda (Schaus, 1920); Acraga canaquitam; (Dyar, 1925)

= Acraga coa =

Species of moth

Acraga coa is a moth of the family Dalceridae. It is found in southern Mexico, Belize, Honduras, Guatemala, El Salvador, Costa Rica and Panama. The habitat consists of tropical wet, tropical moist, tropical premontane wet, tropical premontane rain, tropical lower montane moist, subtropical wet, subtropical moist, subtropical dry and warm temperate wet forests.

The length of the forewings is 12–18 mm (0.47–0.71 in) for males and 19–25 mm (0.75–0.98 in) for females. Adults are on wing year-round.

The larvae feed on the leaves of Terminalia, Coffea and Citrus species.
