= Dalcerides sofia =

Scientific classification
- Kingdom: Animalia
- Phylum: Arthropoda
- Clade: Pancrustacea
- Class: Insecta
- Order: Lepidoptera
- Family: Dalceridae
- Genus: Dalcerides
- Species: D. sofia

Binomial name
- Dalcerides sofia (Dyar, 1910)

Synonyms
- Anacraga sofia Dyar, 1910; Acraga sofia; Anacraga sororcula Dyar, 1927; Acraga sororcula; Anacraga phasma Dyar, 1927; Acraga phasma

Species of moth

Dalcerides sofia is a moth in the family Dalceridae. It was described by Harrison Gray Dyar Jr. in 1910. It is found in southern Mexico, Guatemala, El Salvador, Nicaragua and Costa Rica. The habitat consists of tropical moist, tropical dry, tropical premontane wet, subtropical moist, subtropical dry and warm temperate wet forests.

The length of the forewings is 6–9 mm for males and 9–11 mm for females. Adults are on wing year round.

The larvae have been recorded feeding on an unidentified orchid species.
