= Paracraga =

Scientific classification
- Kingdom: Animalia
- Phylum: Arthropoda
- Class: Insecta
- Order: Lepidoptera
- Family: Dalceridae
- Genus: Paracraga; Dyar, 1905

Genus of moths

Paracraga is a genus of moths of the family Dalceridae.

== Species ==
- Paracraga amianta Dyar, 1909
- Paracraga argentea Schaus, 1910
- Paracraga canalicula Dognin, 1910
- Paracraga halophora Dyar, 1928
- Paracraga innocens Schaus, 1905
- Paracraga necoda Druce, 1901
- Paracraga pulverina Schaus, 1920

== Former species ==
- Paracraga cyclophera Dyar, 1914
