= Dalcerides rebella =

Scientific classification
- Kingdom: Animalia
- Phylum: Arthropoda
- Clade: Pancrustacea
- Class: Insecta
- Order: Lepidoptera
- Family: Dalceridae
- Genus: Dalcerides
- Species: D. rebella

Binomial name
- Dalcerides rebella (Schaus, 1911)

Synonyms
- Anacraga rebella Schaus, 1911; Acraga rebella

Species of moth

Dalcerides rebella is a moth in the family Dalceridae. It was described by Schaus in 1911. It is found in Costa Rica and Ecuador. The habitat consists of tropical wet and premontane wet forests.

The length of the forewings is 7 mm. Adults are on wing in February, March, May and July.
