= Minacraga =

Scientific classification
- Kingdom: Animalia
- Phylum: Arthropoda
- Class: Insecta
- Order: Lepidoptera
- Family: Dalceridae
- Genus: Minacraga; Dyar, 1905

Genus of moths

Minacraga is a genus of moths of the family Dalceridae.

== Species ==
- Minacraga disconitens group:
  - Minacraga disconitens Schaus, 1905
  - Minacraga plata S.E. Miller, 1994
  - Minacraga similis S.E. Miller, 1994
  - Minacraga indiscata Dyar, 1910
  - Minacraga argentata Hopp, 1922
  - Minacraga itatiaia S.E. Miller, 1994
- Minacraga aenea group:
  - Minacraga aenea Hopp, 1921
  - Minacraga hyalina S.E. Miller, 1994
