= Acraga meridensis =

Scientific classification
- Domain: Eukaryota
- Kingdom: Animalia
- Phylum: Arthropoda
- Class: Insecta
- Order: Lepidoptera
- Family: Dalceridae
- Genus: Acraga
- Species: A. meridensis

Binomial name
- Acraga meridensis Dognin, 1907

Species of moth

Acraga meridensis is a moth of the family Dalceridae. It is found in the Andes Mountains of Venezuela and Colombia. The habitat probably consists of tropical premontane and lower montane moist or wet forests.

The length of the forewings is 11–13 mm for males and 17–19 mm for females. Adults are on wing from April to November.
