= Minonoa =

Scientific classification
- Kingdom: Animalia
- Phylum: Arthropoda
- Class: Insecta
- Order: Lepidoptera
- Family: Dalceridae
- Genus: Minonoa; Dyar, 1905

Genus of moths

Minonoa is a genus of moths of the family Dalceridae.

== Species ==
- Minonoa elvira Dognin, 1909
- Minonoa pachitea Hopp, 1922
- Minonoa perbella Schaus, 1905
