= Dalcerides alba =

Scientific classification
- Kingdom: Animalia
- Phylum: Arthropoda
- Clade: Pancrustacea
- Class: Insecta
- Order: Lepidoptera
- Family: Dalceridae
- Genus: Dalcerides
- Species: D. alba

Binomial name
- Dalcerides alba (H. Druce, 1887)

Synonyms
- Dalcera alba H. Druce, 1887; Acraga caretta Dyar, 1910

Species of moth

Dalcerides alba is a moth in the family Dalceridae. It was described by Herbert Druce in 1887. It is found in southern Mexico, Guatemala, Honduras, Belize, Costa Rica, Panama, Colombia and Ecuador.

The larvae feed on Colubrina species.
