= Minacragides arnacis =

Scientific classification
- Kingdom: Animalia
- Phylum: Arthropoda
- Clade: Pancrustacea
- Class: Insecta
- Order: Lepidoptera
- Family: Dalceridae
- Genus: Minacragides
- Species: M. arnacis

Binomial name
- Minacragides arnacis Dyar, 1909

Synonyms
- Ca restricta Schaus, 1940

Species of moth

Minacragides arnacis is a moth in the family Dalceridae. It was described by Harrison Gray Dyar Jr. in 1909. It is found in Colombia, Venezuela, Guyana, Suriname and Peru. The habitat consists of tropical moist, tropical premontane wet, and tropical premontane moist forests.

The length of the forewings is 8–9 mm. Adults are on wing from February to August and November to December.
