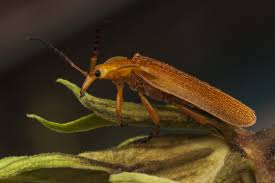

Scientific classification
- Domain: Eukaryota
- Kingdom: Animalia
- Phylum: Arthropoda
- Class: Insecta
- Order: Coleoptera
- Suborder: Polyphaga
- Infraorder: Elateriformia
- Family: Lycidae
- Genus: Lycus
- Species: L. loripes

Binomial name
- Lycus loripes Chevrolat, 1835

= Lycus loripes =

Species of beetle

Lycus loripes is a species of net-winged beetle in the family Lycidae. It is found in North America.
