= Acraga infusa =

Scientific classification
- Kingdom: Animalia
- Phylum: Arthropoda
- Clade: Pancrustacea
- Class: Insecta
- Order: Lepidoptera
- Family: Dalceridae
- Genus: Acraga
- Species: A. infusa

Binomial name
- Acraga infusa Schaus, 1905

Species of moth

Acraga infusa, the yellow furry-legs, is a moth of the family Dalceridae. It is found in Guatemala, Belize, Costa Rica, Panama, Colombia, Venezuela, Trinidad, Guyana, Suriname, French Guiana, Ecuador, Brazil, Peru, Bolivia and Paraguay.

Acraga infusa is featured in a game named Flutter: Starlight as the first moth raised in the game.
