= Lycus simulans =

Scientific classification
- Domain: Eukaryota
- Kingdom: Animalia
- Phylum: Arthropoda
- Class: Insecta
- Order: Coleoptera
- Suborder: Polyphaga
- Infraorder: Elateriformia
- Family: Lycidae
- Genus: Lycus
- Species: L. simulans

Binomial name
- Lycus simulans Schaeffer, 1911

Species of beetle

Lycus simulans is a species of net-winged beetle in the family Lycidae. It is found in North America.
