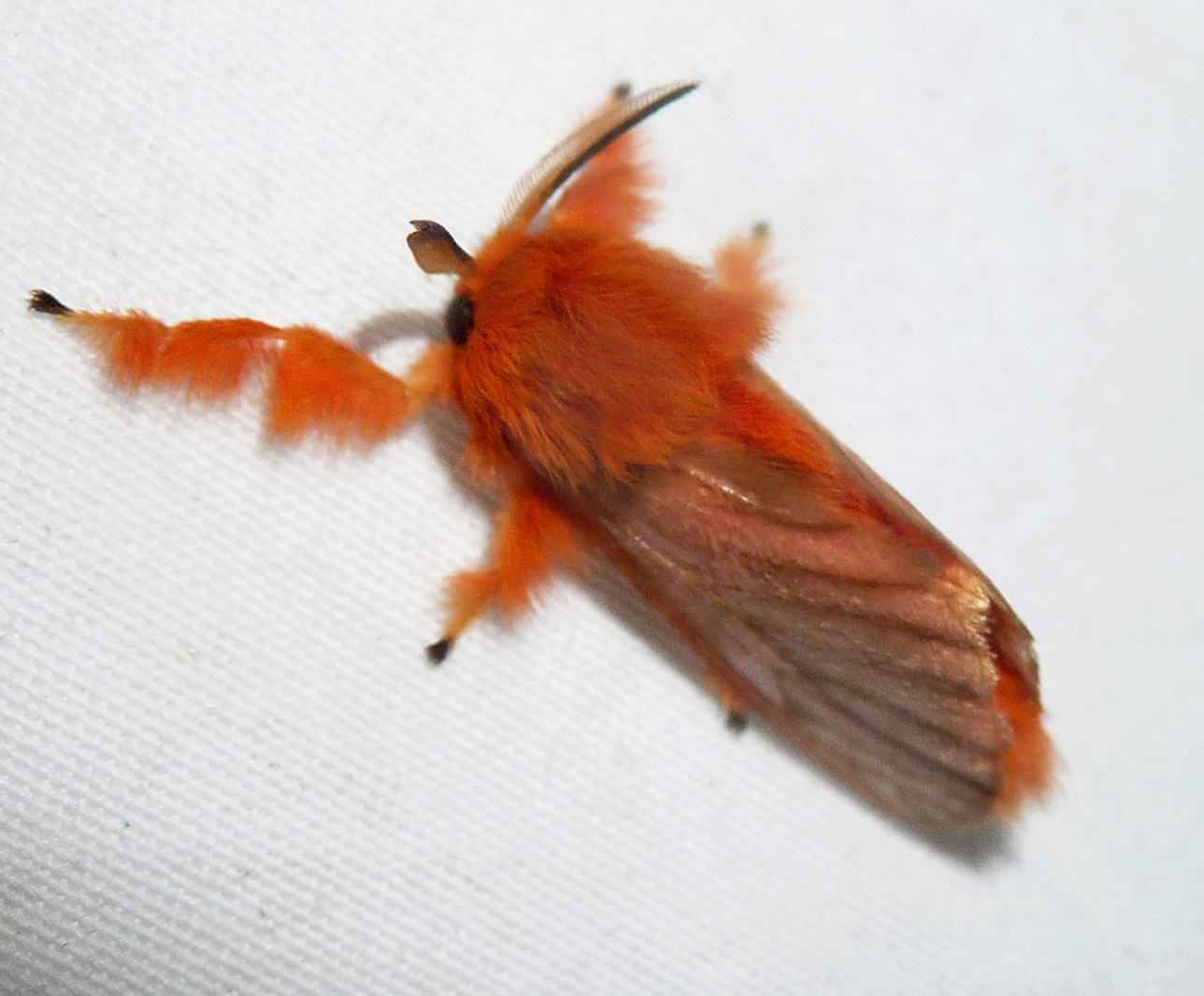
- Acraga moorei imago

Scientific classification
- Kingdom: Animalia
- Phylum: Arthropoda
- Clade: Pancrustacea
- Class: Insecta
- Order: Lepidoptera
- Superfamily: Zygaenoidea
- Family: Dalceridae; Dyar, 1898

Genera
- 11, see text

Synonyms
- Acragidae Hampson, 1918

= Dalceridae =

Family of moths

The Dalceridae are a small family of zygaenoid moths with some 80 known species encompassing about one dozen genera mostly found in the Neotropical region with a few reaching the far south of the Nearctic region.

These are generally small or medium-sized moths with very hairy bodies. The larvae are rather slug-like and, along with the larvae of the sister taxa Limacodidae and Megalopygidae, are often known as slug caterpillars. More specifically, they are also called jewel caterpillars due to the colorful bead-like gelatinous mass covering the exoskeleton of many species.

Female Dalceridae have "accessory glands" that apply a rapidly drying liquid to the eggs. The function of the liquid is unknown but it is theorized that it may provide strength to eggs, help glue the eggs in place, or offer protection from egg parasites.

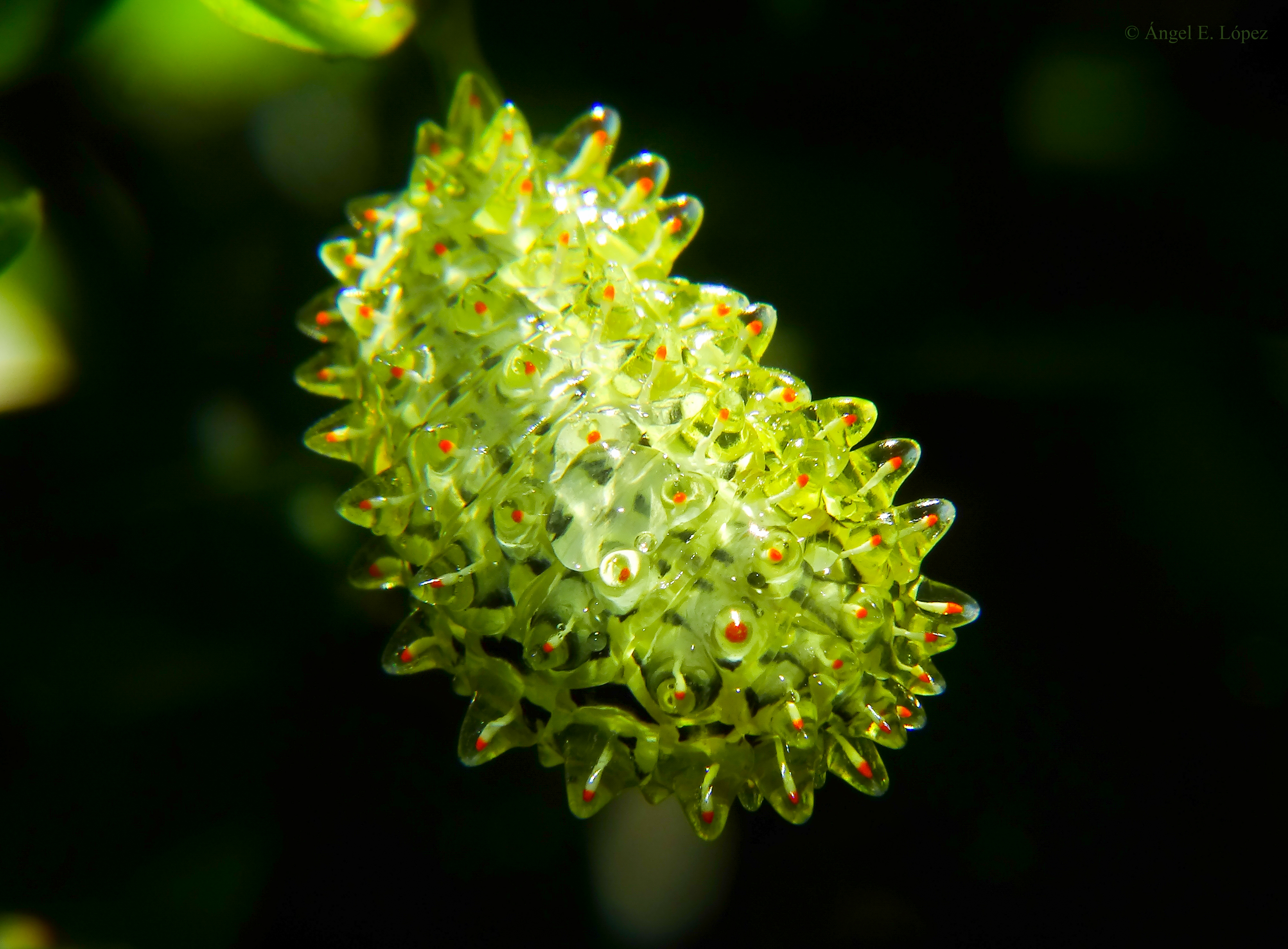
Larva of Acraga coa, showing gelatinous covering

== Taxonomy and systematics ==
More than half the described species are in genus Acraga. Apart from this and Dalcerides, all genera have less than 10 known species as of 2016, and some are monotypic. Two subfamilies are usually recognized:

Subfamily Acraginae

- Acraga (including Anacraga and Dalargentina)
- Dalcerides (including Acragopsis)
- Zikanyrops

Subfamily Dalcerinae

- Ca
- Dalcera
- Dalcerina (including Zadalcera)
- Minacraga
- Minacragides
- Minonoa
- Oroya
- Paracraga

The genus Protacraga, formerly placed here, is now usually assigned to the related family Epipyropidae whose caterpillars are usually parasites.
