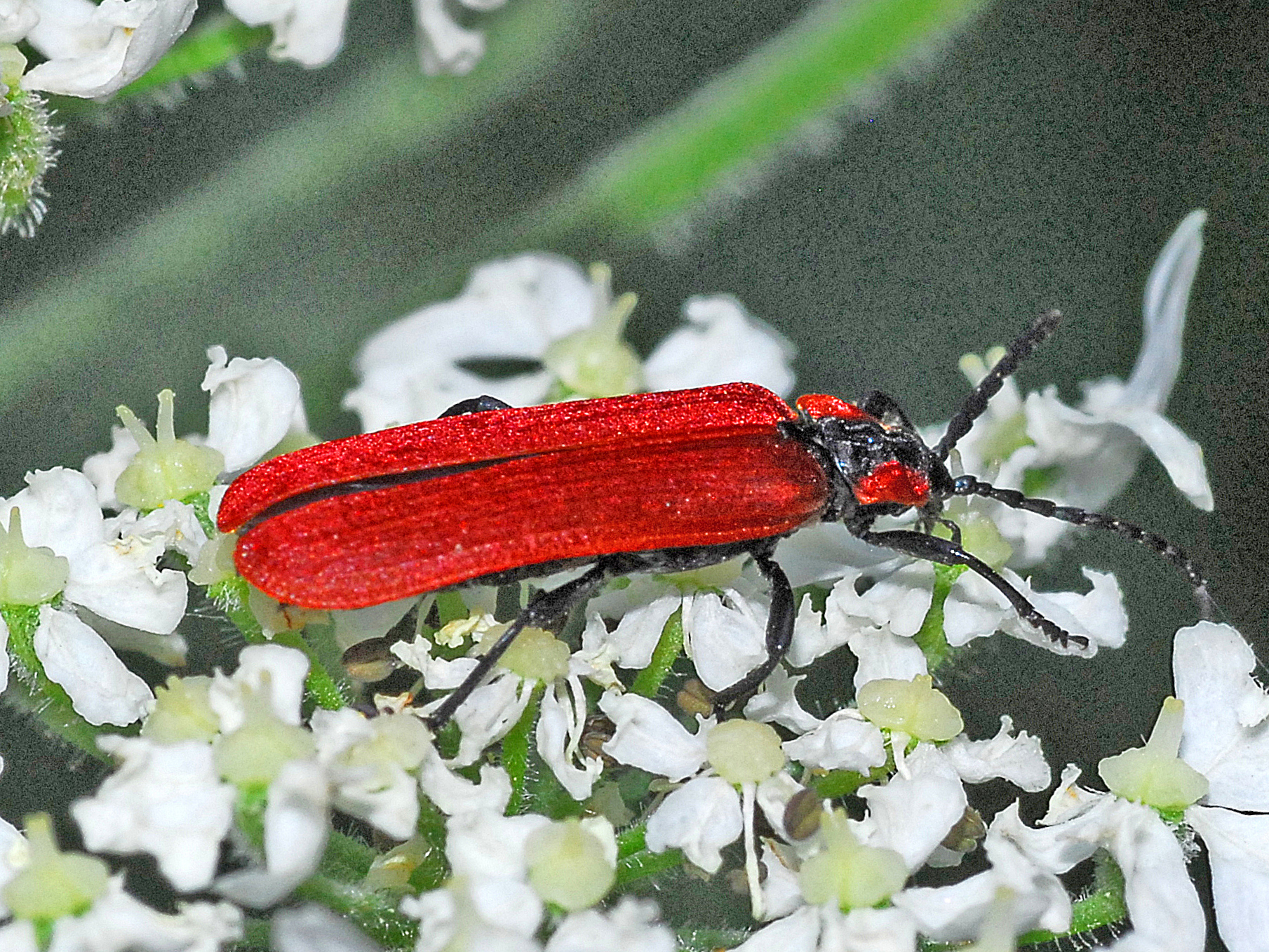

Scientific classification
- Kingdom: Animalia
- Phylum: Arthropoda
- Class: Insecta
- Order: Coleoptera
- Suborder: Polyphaga
- Infraorder: Elateriformia
- Family: Lycidae
- Genus: Lygistopterus
- Species: L. sanguineus

Binomial name
- Lygistopterus sanguineus (Linnaeus, 1758)

= Lygistopterus sanguineus =

Species of beetle

Lygistopterus sanguineus is a species of net-winged beetle in the family Lycidae.

== Distribution and habitat ==
This species is present in Europe, North Africa and Asia. These beetles are abundant in shady, moist forest edges.

== Description ==
Lygistopterus sanguineus can reach a length of 6–12 millimetres (0.24–0.47 in). Body is flat, with red or light brown-reddish elytra and easily visible longitudinal grooves. The upper side is often covered with dense red hairs. Its head has a trunk-like protuberance, which is not found in any other Central European species of its family. The pronotum is black in the middle, but colored the same as the elytra on the left and right outer side.

== Biology ==
The adults can be found from May to September. They prefer flowers exposed to the sun or the foliage of low plants. The larvae develop in rotting wood of deciduous trees, feeding on small invertebrates.

== Bibliography ==
- K.W. Harde, F. Severa: Der Kosmos Käferführer, Die mitteleuropäischen Käfer, Franckh-Kosmos Verlags-GmbH & Co, Stuttgart 2000, ISBN 3-440-06959-1
- Lobl, I.; Smetana, A., eds. (2007). Catalogue of Palaearctic Coleoptera, Volume 4: Elateroidea - Derodontoidea - Bostrichoidea - Lymexyloidea - Cleroidea - Cucujoidea. Apollo Books. ISBN 978-8788757675.

== Gallery ==
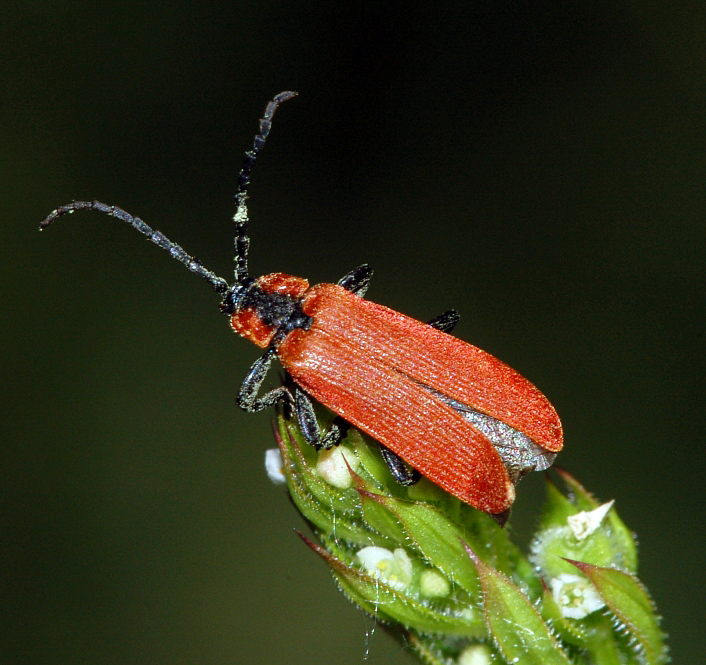
Lygistopterus sanguineus

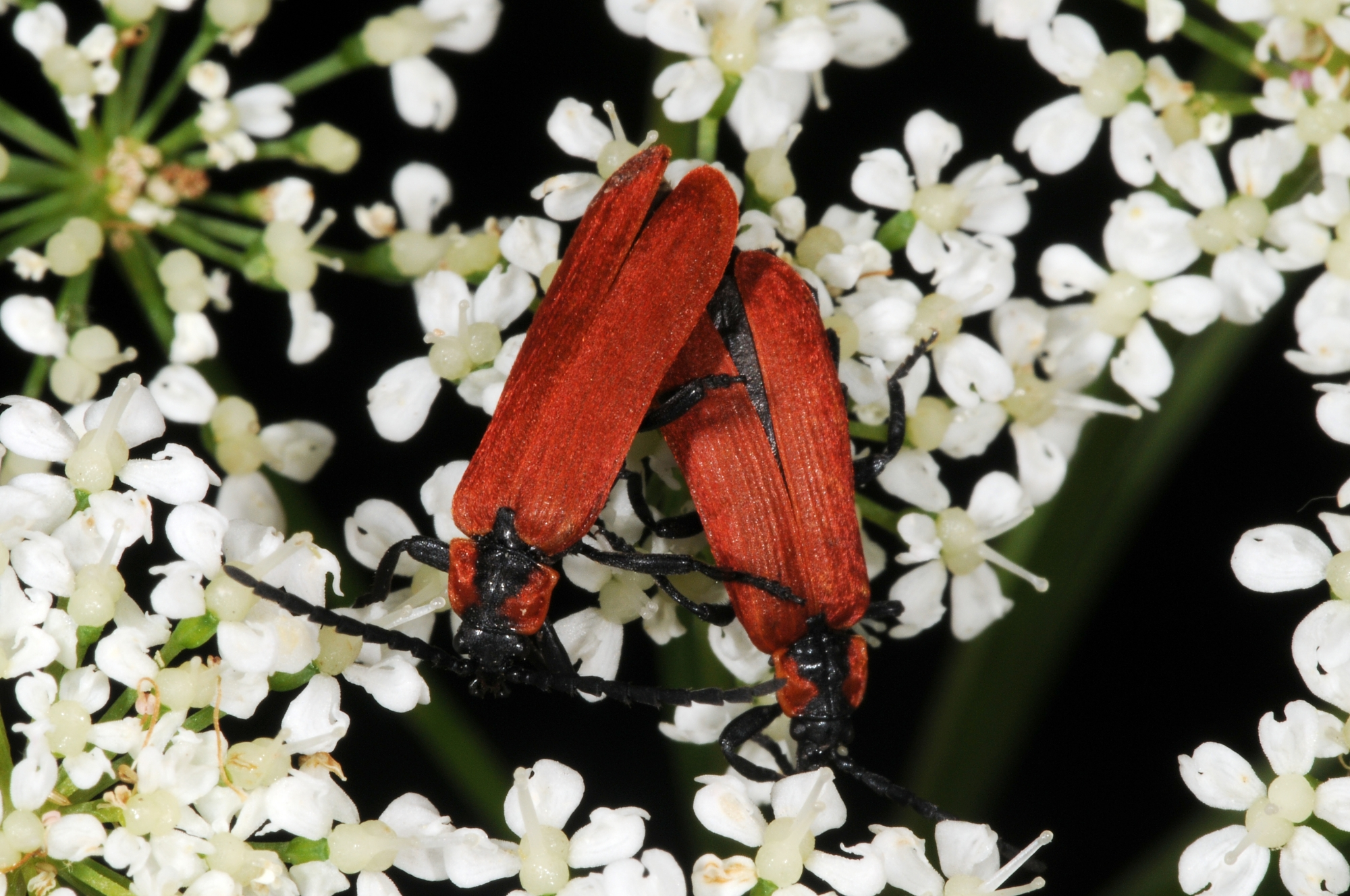
Mating couple

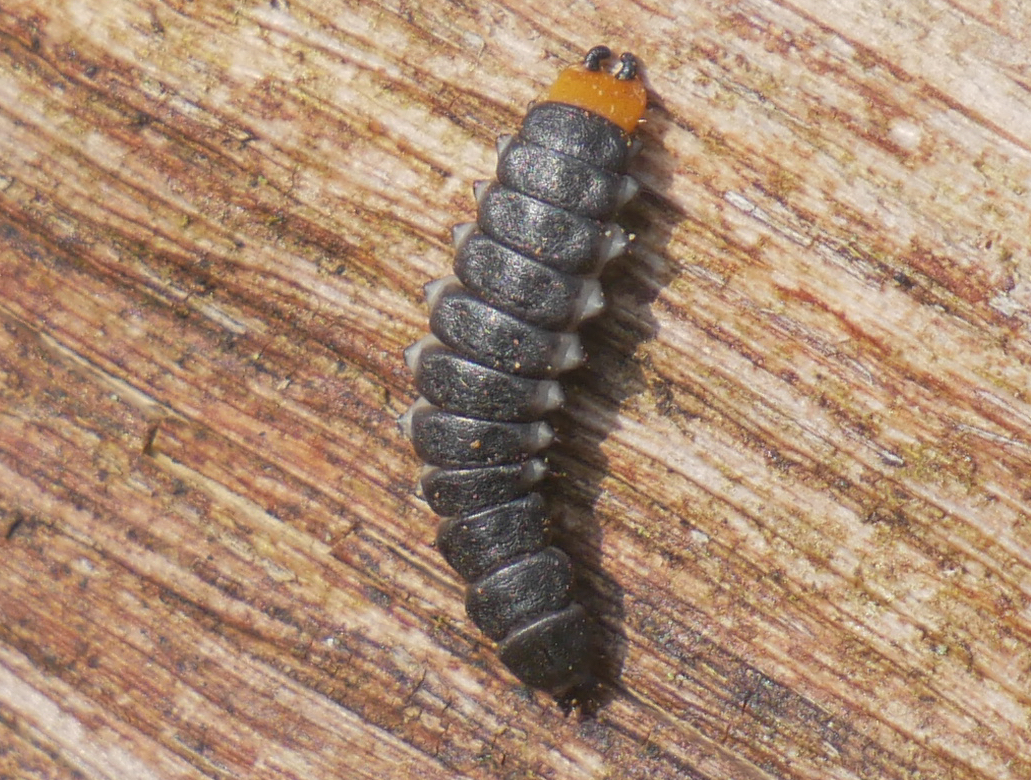
Larva
