= Lygistopterus rubripennis =

Scientific classification
- Kingdom: Animalia
- Phylum: Arthropoda
- Class: Insecta
- Order: Coleoptera
- Suborder: Polyphaga
- Infraorder: Elateriformia
- Family: Lycidae
- Genus: Lygistopterus
- Species: L. rubripennis

Binomial name
- Lygistopterus rubripennis LeConte, 1875

Species of beetle

Lygistopterus rubripennis is a species of net-winged beetle in the family Lycidae. It is found in North America.
