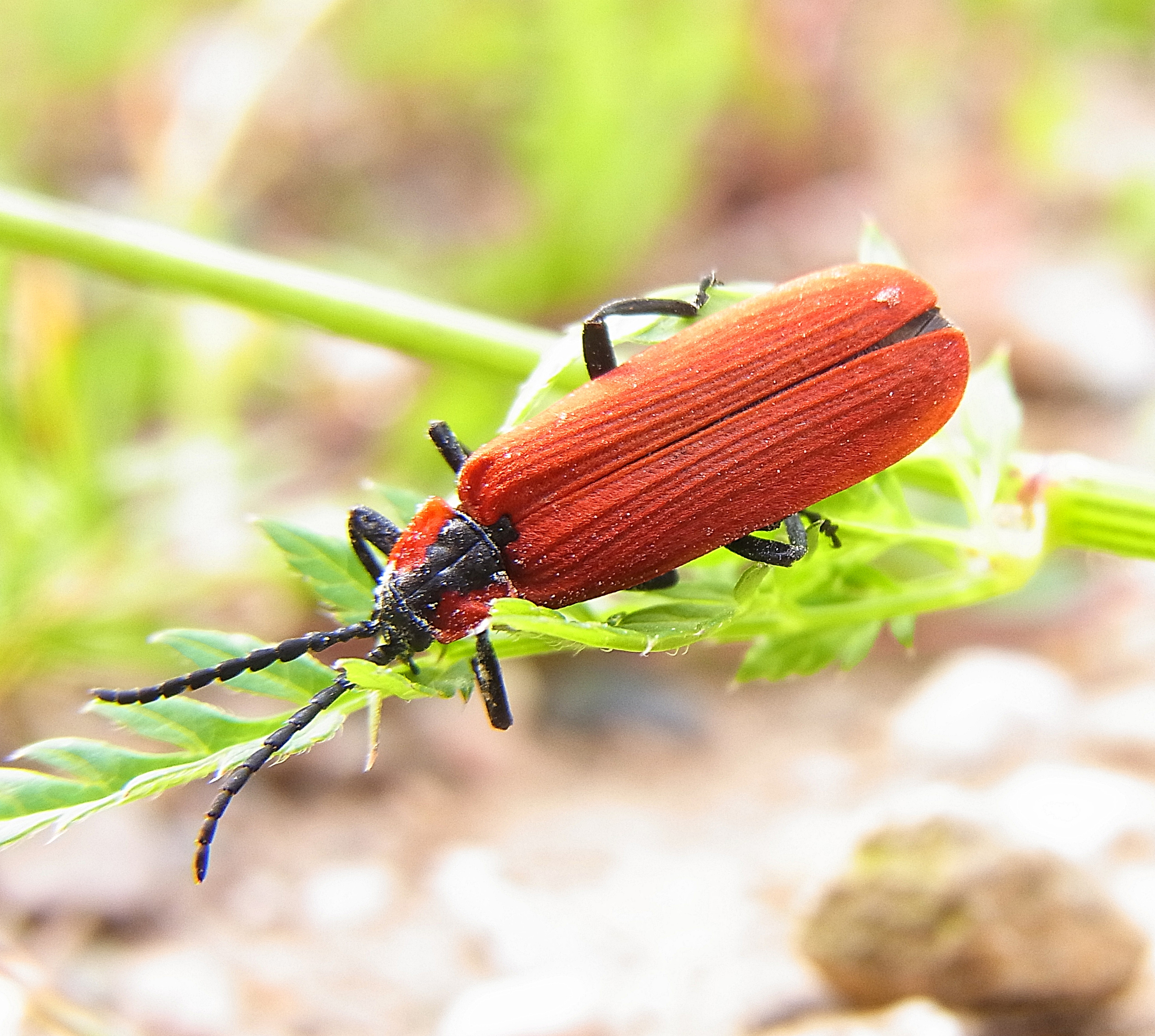
- Lygistopterus sanguineus

Scientific classification
- Kingdom: Animalia
- Phylum: Arthropoda
- Class: Insecta
- Order: Coleoptera
- Suborder: Polyphaga
- Infraorder: Elateriformia
- Family: Lycidae
- Subfamily: Calochrominae
- Genus: Lygistopterus; Dejean, 1833

= Lygistopterus =

Genus of beetles

Lygistopterus is a genus of net-winged beetles in the family Lycidae. There are about 11 described species in Lygistopterus.

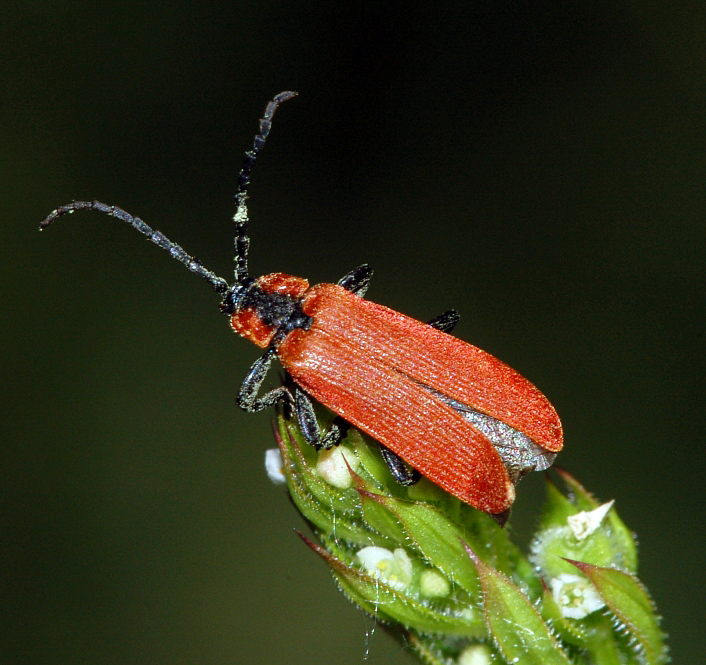
Lygistopterus sanguineus

== Species ==
These 11 species belong to the genus Lygistopterus:

- Lygistopterus bajacalifornicus Zaragoza-Caballero, 2003
- Lygistopterus chamelensis Zaragoza-Caballero, 2003
- Lygistopterus chiapensis Zaragoza-Caballero, 2003
- Lygistopterus chihuahuensis Zaragoza-Caballero, 2003
- Lygistopterus guerrerensis Zaragoza-Caballero, 2003
- Lygistopterus huautlaensis Zaragoza-Caballero, 2003
- Lygistopterus ignitus
- Lygistopterus jalisiensis Zaragoza-Caballero, 2003
- Lygistopterus morelensis Zaragoza-Caballero, 2003
- Lygistopterus rubripennis LeConte, 1875
- Lygistopterus sanguineus (Linnaeus, 1758)
