= List of entomologists =

The following is a list of entomologists, scientists who study insects.

Name	Born	Died	Country	Speciality	Ref.
A					
Lajos Abafi	1840	1909	Hungary	Lepidoptera	
John Abbot	1751	1840	United States		
Elzéar Emmanuel Arène Abeille de Perrin	1843	1910	France	Coleoptera; Diptera; Orthopteroidea	
Camillo Acqua	1863	1936	Italy	Sericulture	
Tsunamitsu Adachi	1901	1981	Japan	Coleoptera	
Adam Afzelius	1750	1837	Sweden		
Louis Agassiz	1807	1873	Switzerland / United States	Coleoptera	
August Ahrens	1779	1841	Germany	Coleoptera	
John Merton Aldrich	1866	1934	United States	Diptera	
Ulisse Aldrovandi	1522	1605	Italy		
Charles Paul Alexander	1889	1981	United States	Diptera	
Wilfred Backhouse Alexander	1885	1965	United Kingdom		
Anastase Alfieri	1892	1971	Italy	Coleoptera	
Ernest Allard	1820	1900	France	Coleoptera	
Vincent Allard	1921	1994	Belgium	Coleoptera: Scarabaeidae: Cetoniinae	
Anthony Adrian Allen	1913	2010	United Kingdom	Coleoptera	
Harry W. Allen	1892	1981	United States		
Charles A. Alluaud	1861	1949	France		
Emmanuel Babatunde Alo	1950		Nigeria		
Carlo Alzona	1881	1961	Italy	Coleoptera	
William de Alwis	1842	1916	Sri Lanka	Lepidoptera	
Charles Jean-Baptiste Amyot	1799	1866	France	Hemiptera	
César Marie Félix Ancey	1860	1906	France	Hemiptera	
Félix Jean Marie Louis Ancey	1835	1919	France	Coleoptera, Hymenoptera	
Alfredo Andreini	1870	1943	Italy		
Herbert Edward Andrewes	1863	1950	England	Coleoptera - Carabidae	
Louis Gabriel d'Antessanty	1834	1922	France	Hemiptera, Orthoptera, Coleoptera	
Charles S. Apperson			United States	Medical entomology: vectors, such as Parasitiformes and Diptera	
Ross H. Arnett Jr.	1919	1999	United States	Coleoptera	
Konstantin Vladimirovich Arnoldi	1901	1982	Russia (USSR)	Hymenoptera: Formicidae	
Johan Emil Aro	1874	1928	Finland	Ephemeroptera	
Gilbert John Arrow	1873	1948	United Kingdom	Coleoptera	
Syoziro Asahina	1913	2010	Japan	Odonata	
William Harris Ashmead	1855	1905	United States	Hymenoptera	
E. C. M. d'Assis-Fonseca	1899	1993	United Kingdom	Diptera	
Edwin Felix Thomas Atkinson	1840	1890	Ireland	Hemiptera	
William Stephen Atkinson	1820	1876	India	Lepidoptera	
Charles Nicholas Aubé	1802	1869	France	Coleoptera	
Jean Guillaume Audinet-Serville	1775	1858	France	Orthoptera	
Jean Victoire Audouin	1797	1841	France		
Per Olof Christopher Aurivillius	1843	1928	Sweden	Coleoptera, Lepidoptera	
Jules Léon Austaut	1844	1929	France	Lepidoptera	
Ernest Edward Austen	1867	1938	United Kingdom	Diptera, Hymenoptera	
Andrey Avinoff	1884	1949	Russia (Ukraine) / United States	Lepidoptera	
B					
André Badonnel	1898	1991	France	Psocoptera	
Martin Baehr	1943	2019	Germany		
Francisco E. Baisas	1896	1973	Philippines		
Alfred Balachowsky	1901	1983	Russia / France	Hemiptera, Coleoptera	
George Eugene Ball	1926	2019	United States	Coleoptera	
Mary Ball	1812	1892	Ireland	Odonata, Hemiptera	
Vladimír Balthasar	1897	1978	Czech Republic (Czechoslovakia)	Coleoptera: Scarabaeoidea; Hymenoptera: Chrysidoidea, Sphecoidea (= Spheciformes)	
Joseph Sugar Baly	1816	1890	United Kingdom	Coleoptera	
John Banister	1650	1692	United Kingdom		
Nathan Banks	1868	1953	United States	Neuroptera, Megaloptera, Hymenoptera	
Constant Bar	1817	1884	France		
Herbert Spencer Barber	1882	1950	United States		
Max Barclay			United Kingdom	Coleoptera	
Philip James Barraud	1879	1948	United Kingdom	Diptera	
Edward M. Barrows	1946		United States	Hymenoptera: Xylocopa virginica	
Eugène Barthe	1862	1945	France	Coleoptera	
Agostino Bassi	1773	1856	Italy		
Henry Walter Bates	1825	1892	United Kingdom		
Marston Bates	1906	1974	United States	Diptera	
Flaminio Baudi di Selve	1821	1901	Italy	Coleoptera, Heteroptera	
Palisot de Beauvois	1752	1820	France		
Roger A. Beaver			United Kingdom		
Eduard Becher	1856	1886	Austria	Diptera	
Jan Bechyně	1920	1973	Czech Republic (Czechoslovakia)	Coleoptera: Chrysomelidae	
Theodor Becker	1840	1928	Germany	Diptera	
Ernest Marie Louis Bedel	1849	1922	France	Coleoptera	
Jacqueline Beggs	1962		New Zealand		
Louis Beguin-Billecocq	1865	1957	France	Coleoptera	
Hans Hermann Behr	1818	1904	Germany / United States	Lepidoptera	
Bryan Patrick Beirne	1918	1998	Ireland	Lepidoptera, Hymenoptera	
Gustav Wilhelm Belfrage	1834	1882	United States		
John N. Belkin	1913	1980	United States		
Ross Taylor Bell	1929	2019	United States	Coleoptera: Carabidae	
Luigi Bellardi	1859	1889	Italy	Diptera	
Jean-Baptiste Eugène Bellier de La Chavignerie	1819	1888	France	Lepidoptera	
Joseph Charles Bequaert	1886	1982	Belgium	Diptera	
May Berenbaum	1953		United States		
Julius von Bergenstamm	1837	1896	Austria	Diptera	
Georges Bernardi	1922	1999	France	Lepidoptera: Pieridae	
Grigory Yakovlevich Bey-Bienko	1903	1971	Russia (USSR)	Blattodea; Dermaptera; Orthoptera; General and Economic entomology	
Mario Bezzi	1868	1927	Italy	Diptera	
Czesław Bieżanko	1895	1985	Poland	Lepidoptera	
George Carter Bignell	1826	1910	United Kingdom	Lepidoptera; Hymenoptera: mainly Ichneumonidae	
Jacques Marie François Bigot	1818	1893	France	Diptera	
Gustaf Johan Billberg	1772	1844	Sweden		
Charles Thomas Bingham	1848	1908	Ireland	Hymenoptera	
Thomas Blackburn	1844	1912	United Kingdom / Hawaii / Australia	Coleoptera	
Maulsby Willett Blackman	1876	1943	United States		
Richard E. Blackwelder	1909	2001	United States		
Doris Holmes Blake	1892	1978	United States		
Émile Blanchard	1819	1900	France		
Willis Stanley Blatchley	1859	1940	United States	Coleoptera, Orthoptera, Hemiptera	
Murray Sheldon Blum	1929	2015	United States	Hymenoptera: Formicidae	
Johann von Böber	1746	1820	Germany (Thuringia) / Russia	Coleoptera, Lepidoptera	
Carl Henrik Boheman	1796	1868	Sweden	Coleoptera	
Henri Boileau	1866	1924	France	Coleoptera - Lucanidae	
Jean Baptiste Alphonse Déchauffour de Boisduval	1799	1879	France	Lepidoptera	
Ignacio Bolívar y Urrutia	1850	1944	Spain		
Cándido Luis Bolívar y Pieltáin	1897	1976	Spain	Lepidoptera	
Ernst Friedrich August Boll	1817	1868	Germany	Lepidoptera	
Barry Bolton			United Kingdom	Hymenoptera: Formicidae	
Franco Andrea Bonelli	1784	1830	Italy	Coleoptera	
Charles Bonnet	1720	1793	Switzerland		
George Bornemissza	1924	2014	Australia	Coleoptera	
Carl Julius Bernhard Börner	1880	1953	Germany	Collembola	
Nérée Boubée	1806	1863	France	Lepidoptera, Coleoptera	
Peter Friedrich Bouché	1785	1856	Germany	Diptera	
Jean Bourgogne	1903	1999	France	Lepidoptera: Psychidae	
Eugène Louis Bouvier	1856	1944	France		
James Henry Bowker	1822	1900	South Africa	Lepidoptera	
Nikolaus Joseph Brahm	1751	1812	Germany		
Harry Urad Brailovsky Alperowitz	1946		Mexico	Hemiptera: Heteroptera: Coreidae	
Hazel Branch	1886	1973	United States		
Karel Brančik	1842	1915	Hungary	Coleoptera	
Rick Brandenburg	1955		United States		
Eduard Karlovich Brandt	1839	1891	Russia	Insect morphology and physiology	
Friedrich Moritz Brauer	1832	1904	Austria	Diptera, Neuroptera	
Annette Frances Braun	1884	1978	United States		
Ferdinando Arborio Gattinara di Breme	1807	1869	Italy	Diptera, Coleoptera	
Otto Vasilievich Bremer	1812	1873	Russia	Lepidoptera	
Johann Jacob Bremi-Wolf	1791	1857	Switzerland	Coleoptera; Diptera: Cecidomyiidae	
Juan Brèthes	1871	1928	France / Argentina		
Stephan von Breuning	1894	1983	Germany	Coleoptera: Cerambycidae: Lamiinae	
Per Brinck	1919	2013	Sweden		
Carl Gustav Alexander Brischke	1814	1897	Poland	Diptera, Hymenoptera	
Steve Brooks			United Kingdom	Diptera: Chironomidae; Odonata	
Georges Brossard	1940	2019	Canada		
Thomas Broun	1838	1919	New Zealand	Coleoptera	
François-Robert Fenwick Brown	1837	1915	France	Lepidoptera	
Carlos Bruch	1869	1943	Germany / Argentina		
Emil von Brück	1807	1884	Germany	Coleoptera	
Charles Thomas Brues	1879	1955	United States	Diptera, Hymenoptera	
Gaspard Auguste Brullé	1809	1873	France		
Enrico Brunetti	1862	1927	United Kingdom	Diptera	
Felix Bryk	1882	1957	Sweden	Lepidoptera	
Lee L. Buchanan	1893	1958	United States		
William Buckler	1814	1884	United Kingdom	Lepidoptera	
Jean Baptiste Lucien Buquet	1807	1889	France	Coleoptera	
Ivan Buresh	1885	1980	Bulgaria		
Barnard D. Burks	1909	1990	United States		
Hermann Burmeister	1807	1892	Germany		
John Burns			United States	Lepidoptera	
Arthur Gardiner Butler	1844	1925	United Kingdom		
Edward Albert Butler	1845	1925	United Kingdom	Hemiptera	
Kurt Büttner	1881	1967	Germany	Heteroptera	
C					
Elsa Salazar Cade	1952		Mexico / United States		
William H. Cade			United States		
Philip Powell Calvert	1871	1961	United States	Odonata	
Malcolm Cameron	1873	1954	United Kingdom	Coleoptera	
Peter Cameron	1847	1912	United Kingdom	Hymenoptera	
Dušan Čamprag	1925	2021	Serbia	Economic entomology: pest control	
Giulio Camus	1847	1914	France	Economic history of entomology	
Ernest Candèze	1827	1898	Belgium	Coleoptera	
Silvano Canzoneri	1941	1995	Italy	Coleoptera, Diptera	
Pierre Capdeville	1908	1980	France	Lepidoptera: Parnassiinae	
Hahn William Capps	1903	1998	United States		
Jean-Baptiste Capronnier	1814	1891	Belgium	Lepidoptera	
Frank M. Carpenter	1902	1994	United States	Palaeoentomology	
Herbert James Carter	1858	1940	Australia		
Thomas Lincoln Casey Jr.	1857	1925	United States	Coleoptera	
François-Louis Laporte, comte de Castelnau	1802	1880	France	Coleoptera	
Guelfo Cavanna	1850	1920	Italy	All orders	
George Charles Champion	1851	1927	United Kingdom	Coleoptera	
Edward Albert Chapin	1894	1969	United States		
Toussaint de Charpentier	1779	1847	Germany		
Maximilien Chaudoir	1816	1881	Russia	Coleoptera - Carabidae	
Rémy Chauvin	1913	2009	France	Insecta: mainly Formicidae, Anthophila; social organization in insects; insect physiology; insect ecology and behavior	
Lucy Evelyn Cheesman	1881	1969	United Kingdom		
Chen Shixiang	1905	1988	China		
Louis Alexandre Auguste Chevrolat	1799	1884	France	Coleoptera	
Huai C. Chiang	1915	2005	United States	Integrated pest management	
Rickard Christophers	1873	1978	United Kingdom	Diptera	
Hong-Fu Chu	1910	2002	China	insect immatures	
Joseph Philippe de Clairville	1742	1830	Switzerland		
Benjamin Preston Clark	1860	1939	United States	Lepidoptera	
Hamlet Clark	1823	1867	United Kingdom	Coleoptera	
Cyril Clarke	1907	2000	United Kingdom	Lepidoptera	
Eric William Classey	1916	2008	United Kingdom	Lepidoptera, entomological publisher	
James Brackenridge Clemens	1825	1867	United States	Lepidoptera	
Carl Alexander Clerck	1709	1765	Sweden	Lepidoptera	
Theodore Dru Alison Cockerell	1866	1948	United States	Hymenoptera	
James Edward Collin	1876	1968	United Kingdom	Diptera	
John Henry Comstock	1849	1931	United States		
Daniel William Coquillett	1856	1911	United States	Diptera	
Matthew Cooke	1829	1887	Ireland	Economic entomology	
Charles Coquerel	1822	1867	France		
Philip S. Corbet	1929	2008	United Kingdom	Odonata; Diptera: Culicidae	
Emilio Cornalia	1824	1882	Italy		
Achille Costa	1823	1899	Italy		
Oronzio Gabriele Costa	1787	1867	Italy		
Ângelo Moreira da Costa Lima	1887	1964	Brazil	Insects of Brazil; Economic and medical entomology	
Everard Charles Cotes	1862	1944	United Kingdom / India		
John Cowley	1909	1967	United Kingdom		
George Crabbe	1754	1832	United Kingdom	Coleoptera	
Pieter Cramer	1738	1804	Netherlands		
William Monod Crawford	1872	1941	Ireland	Lepidoptera	
Ezra Townsend Cresson	1838	1926	United States	Hymenoptera	
Norman Criddle	1875	1933	United Kingdom / Canada		
Roger Ward Crosskey	1930	2017	United Kingdom	Diptera, Hymenoptera	
George Robert Crotch	1842	1874	United States / United Kingdom	Coleoptera	
Philip Crowley	1837	1900	England	Lepidoptera	
Roy Crowson	1914	1999	United Kingdom	Coleoptera	
Ernő Csíki	1875	1954	Hungary	Coleoptera	
Philippe Cuénoud	1968		Switzerland	Psocoptera	
Charles Howard Curran	1894	1972	United States	Diptera	
John Curtis	1791	1862	United Kingdom	Coleoptera	
Leander Czerny	1859	1944	Austria	Diptera	
D					
Anders Gustaf Dahlbom	1806	1859	Sweden	Hymenoptera	
Roger Dajoz	1929	2019	France		
James Charles Dale	1792	1872	United Kingdom	Coleoptera	
Johan Wilhelm Dalman	1787	1828	Sweden		
Mikhail Danilevsky	1948		Russia	Coleoptera: Cerambycidae	
Walter Dannatt	1863	1940	United Kingdom	Lepidoptera	
Franz Dannehl	1870	1947	Germany	Lepidoptera	
P. Jackson Darlington Jr.	1904	1983	United States		
Charles Darwin	1809	1882	United Kingdom	Coleoptera. Charles Darwin was known in his youth as a beetle collector.	
Amina Davletshina	1915	1995	USSR (Uzbekistan)	Aphididae, Termitoidae, Agricultural entomology	
Thomas Reid Davys Bell	1863	1948	Ireland	Lepidoptera	
John Frederic Dawson	1802	1870	England	Coleoptera - Carabidae	
Charles De Geer	1720	1778	Sweden	Coleoptera	
José María Hugo de la Fuente Morales	1855	1932	Spain	Coleoptera	
Pierre François Marie Auguste Dejean	1780	1845	France	Coleoptera	
Georges Demoulin	1919	1994	Belgium	Ephemeroptera	
Michael Denis	1729	1800	Austria	Lepidoptera	
Robert Denno	1945	2008	United States	Lepidoptera	
Thomas Desvignes	1812	1868	England	Hymenoptera	
Vincent Dethier	1915	1993	United States		
Thierry Deuve	1956		France	Coleoptera	
Achille Deyrolle	1813	1865	France	Coleoptera	
Harry Frederick Dietz	1890	1954	United States	Economic entomology	
William Lucas Distant	1845	1922	United Kingdom		
Frederick Augustus Dixey	1855	1935	United Kingdom	Lepidoptera	
Rennie Wilbur Doane	1871	1942	United States	Diptera	
Theodosius Dobzhansky	1900	1975	Ukraine / United States		
Paul Dognin	1847	1931	France	Lepidoptera	
William Doherty	1857	1901	United States	Lepidoptera	
Carl August Dohrn	1806	1892	Germany	Coleoptera	
Horace Donisthorpe	1870	1951	United Kingdom	Coleoptera; Hymenoptera: Formicidae	
Charles Donovan	1863	1951	Ireland	Lepidoptera	
Edward Donovan	1768	1837	Ireland		
Alcide d'Orbigny	1802	1857	France		
Edward Doubleday	1810	1849	United Kingdom	Lepidoptera	
Henry Doubleday	1808	1875	United Kingdom	Lepidoptera	
John William Douglas	1814	1905	United Kingdom	Lepidoptera	
Max Wilhelm Karl Draudt	1875	1953	Germany	Lepidoptera	
Claudia Drees			Germany	Coleoptera, biodiversity	
Alexander Kirilow Drenowski	1879	1967	Bulgaria		
Herbert Druce	1846	1913	United Kingdom	Lepidoptera	
Dru Drury	1725	1804	United Kingdom		
Catherine N. Duckett	1961		United States	Coleoptera	
Oswald Duda	1869	1941	Germany	Diptera	
Léon Jean Marie Dufour	1780	1865	France		
Caspar Erasmus Duftschmid	1767	1821	Austria	Coleoptera	
Lionel Jack Dumbleton	1905	1976	New Zealand	Lepidoptera	
André Marie Constant Duméril	1774	1860	France	Coleoptera	
Philogène Auguste Joseph Duponchel	1774	1846	France	Lepidoptera	
Henry Dupont	1798	1873	France	Coleoptera	
Gabriel Dupuy	1840	1913	France	Lepidoptera	
Harrison Gray Dyar Jr.	1866	1929	United States	Diptera	
Jan Dzierżon	1811	1906	Poland	Hymenoptera	
E					
Alfred Edwin Eaton	1845	1929	United Kingdom	Diptera, Ephemeroptera	
Karl Eckstein	1859	1939	Germany	Lepidoptera	
Frederick Wallace Edwards	1888	1940	United Kingdom	Diptera	
Henry Edwards	1827	1891	United Kingdom / Australia / United States	Lepidoptera	
J. Gordon Edwards	1919	2004	United States		
William Henry Edwards	1822	1909	United States	Lepidoptera	
Johann Egger	1804	1866	Austria	Diptera	
Georg Dionysius Ehret	1708	1770	Germany		
Paul R. Ehrlich	1932	2026	United States	Lepidoptera	
Curt Eisner	1890	1981	Germany	Lepidoptera	
Henry John Elwes	1846	1922	United Kingdom	Lepidoptera	
Alfred E. Emerson, Jr.	1896	1976	United States	Isoptera	
Carlo Emery	1848	1925	Italy	Hymenoptera	
Günther Enderlein	1872	1968	Germany	Diptera	
Michael S. Engel	1971		United States	Zoraptera, Hymenoptera, fossils	
Darragh Ennis			Ireland	Insects	
Wilhelm Ferdinand Erichson	1809	1848	Germany	Coleoptera	
Terry Erwin	1940	2020	United States		
Teiso Esaki	1899	1957	Japan		
Johann Friedrich von Eschscholtz	1793	1831	Estonia (Livonia)		
Eugenius Johann Christoph Esper	1742	1810	Germany		
Howard Ensign Evans	1919	2002	United States	Hymenoptera	
William Frederick Evans			United Kingdom	Odonata, Orthoptera	
William Harry Evans	1876	1956	United Kingdom	Lepidoptera	
Neal Evenhuis	1952		United States	Diptera	
Eduard Friedrich Eversmann	1794	1860	Germany		
F					
Jean-Henri Fabre	1823	1915	France	Insecta, especially Endopterygota: mainly Hymenoptera; insect behavior	
Johan Christian Fabricius	1745	1808	Denmark	Insecta. Fabricius' system remains the basis of insect classification today.	
Olof Immanuel von Fåhraeus	1796	1884	Sweden	Coleoptera	
Graham Fairchild	1906	1994	United States	Diptera	
Léon Fairmaire	1820	1906	France	Coleoptera	
Franz Faldermann	1799	1838	Germany	Coleoptera	
Henry Clinton Fall	1862	1939	United States	Coleoptera	
Carl Fredrik Fallén	1764	1830	Sweden	Diptera	
Charles Adolphe Albert Fauvel	1840	1921	France	Coleoptera	
Zicman Feider	1903	1979	Romania		
Baron Cajetan von Felder	1814	1894	Austria	Lepidoptera	
Rudolf Felder	1842	1871	Austria	Lepidoptera	
Ephraim Porter Felt	1868	1943	United States	Diptera	
Feng Lanzhou	1903	1972	China		
Ferdinand I of Bulgaria	1861	1948	Bulgaria	Lepidoptera	
Charles H. Fernald	1838	1921	United States	Lepidoptera	
Michael Lloyd Ferrar	1876	1931	United Kingdom	Lepidoptera	
Pietro Mansueto Ferrari	1823	1893	Italy	Hemiptera	
Leopold Heinrich Fischer	1817	1886	Germany		
Josef Emanuel Fischer von Röslerstamm	1787	1866	Austria / Czech Republic (Bohemia)	Lepidoptera	
Johann Gotthelf Fischer von Waldheim	1771	1853	Germany (Saxony) / Russia	Insects of Russia; Coleoptera, Diptera	
Asa Fitch	1809	1879	United States		
Ernst Josef Fittkau	1927	2012	Germany	Diptera	
Antonín Fleischer	1850	1934	Czechoslovakia	Coleoptera	
John Fleming	1785	1857	United Kingdom		
James Fletcher	1852	1908	Canada		
Thomas Bainbrigge Fletcher	1878	1950	United Kingdom		
Edmond Jean-Baptiste Fleutiaux	1858	1851	France	Coleoptera	
Gustav Flor	1829	1883	Estonia (Livonia)		
William Trowbridge Merrifield Forbes	1885	1968	United States	Lepidoptera, Coleoptera	
E. B. Ford	1901	1988	United Kingdom	Lepidoptera	
Auguste-Henri Forel	1848	1931	Switzerland	Hymenoptera: Formicidae	
Arnold Förster	1810	1884	Germany	Coleoptera, Hymenoptera	
Johann Reinhold Forster	1729	1798	Germany		
Margaret Fountaine	1862	1940	United Kingdom	Lepidoptera	
Antoine François, comte de Fourcroy	1755	1809	France		
William Weekes Fowler	1849	1923	United Kingdom	Coleoptera	
Georg Ritter von Frauenfeld	1807	1873	Austria	Diptera	
Amnon Freidberg	1945	2020	Israel	Diptera	
Charles French	1842	1933	Australia	Economic entomology	
Heinrich Frey	1822	1890	Switzerland	Lepidoptera	
Richard Karl Hjalmar Frey	1886	1965	Finland	Diptera	
Christian Friedrich Freyer	1794	1885	Germany	Lepidoptera	
Heinrich Friese	1860	1948	Germany		
Karl von Frisch	1886	1982	Austria	Hymenoptera: Apis mellifera	
Imre Frivaldszky	1799	1870	Hungary	Lepidoptera, Coleoptera	
János Frivaldszky	1822	1895	Hungary	Coleoptera, Orthoptera	
Walter Wilson Froggatt	1858	1937	Australia	Economic entomology	
Frederick William Frohawk	1861	1946	United Kingdom	Lepidoptera	
Stuart W. Frost	1891	1990	United States	Diptera	
Hans Fruhstorfer	1866	1922	Germany	Lepidoptera	
Johann Kaspar Füssli	1743	1786	Switzerland		
G					
Heinrich Moritz Gaede	1795	1834	Germany		
Max Gaede	1871	1946	Germany		
Charles Joseph Gahan	1862	1939	United Kingdom / Ireland	Coleoptera	
Ángel Gallardo	1867	1934	Argentina		
Ludwig Ganglbauer	1856	1912	Austria	Coleoptera	
Gao Taiping	1984		China		
Wulf Hermann Gatter	1943		Germany	Population ecology of insects, especially insect migration	
Friedrich August von Gebler	1781	1850	Germany (Thuringia) / Russia	Coleoptera	
Giuseppe Gené	1800	1847	Italy		
Étienne Louis Geoffroy	1725	1810	France	Coleoptera	
Ernst Friedrich Germar	1786	1853	Germany	Coleoptera	
Carl Eduard Adolph Gerstaecker	1828	1895	Germany		
Paul Gervais	1816	1879	France		
Raffaello Gestro	1845	1936	Italy	Coleoptera	
Carl Geyer	1802	1889	Germany (Bavaria)	Entomological illustrator (Lepidoptera)	
Mercury Sergeyevich Ghilarov	1912	1985	Russia (USSR)	Soil insects	
Michael Thomas Gillies	1920	1999	United Kingdom	Medical entomology	
Antonio Giordani Soika	1913	1997	Italy	Hymenoptera	
Joseph-Étienne Giraud	1808	1877	France	Coleoptera, Hymenoptera	
Alexandre Arsène Girault	1884	1941	United States / Australia	Hymenoptera: Chalcidoidea	
Ernst August Girschner	1860	1914	Germany	Diptera	
Johannes von Nepomuk Franz Xaver Gistel	1809	1873	Germany		
Eleanor Glanville	1654	1709	United Kingdom	Coleoptera	
Jean-Baptiste Godart	1775	1825	France	Lepidoptera	
Frederick DuCane Godman	1834	1919	United Kingdom	Lepidoptera	
Jan Goedart	1620	1668	Netherlands		
Maurice Emile Marie Goetghebuer	1876	1962	Belgium	Diptera	
Johann August Ephraim Goeze	1731	1793	Germany		
Gordon Gordh	1945		United States		
Deborah M. Gordon	1955		United States	Hymenoptera: Formicidae	
Hippolyte Louis Gory	1800	1852	France	Coleoptera	
William Gould	1715	1799	United Kingdom	Hymenoptera: Formicidae	
Claude Charles Goureau	1790	1879	France		
Eduard Heinrich Graeffe	1833	1916	Switzerland		
Mariano de la Paz Graells y de la Agüera	1809	1898	Spain		
Pierre-Paul Grassé	1895	1985	France	Isoptera	
Johann Ludwig Christian Gravenhorst	1777	1857	Germany		
Philip Graves	1876	1953	Ireland	Lepidoptera	
George Robert Gray	1808	1872	United Kingdom		
Viktor Stepanovich Grebennikov	1927	2001	Russia	Hymenoptera: Apis mellifera; popular entomology	
Auguste Jean François Grenier	1814	1890	France	Coleoptera	
Thomas de Grey, 6th Baron Walsingham	1843	1919	United Kingdom	Lepidoptera	
David A. Grimaldi	1957		United States	Palaeoentomology; Diptera; Hymenoptera: Formicidae	
Augustus Radcliffe Grote	1841	1903	United Kingdom	Lepidoptera	
Grigory Grum-Grshimailo	1860	1936	Russia	Lepidoptera	
Achille Guenée	1809	1880	France	Lepidoptera	
Félix Édouard Guérin-Méneville	1799	1874	France		
Guido of Pisa		1169	Italy		
Félix Guignot	1882	1959	France	Coleoptera	
Leonard Gyllenhaal	1752	1840	Sweden	Coleoptera	
H					
Johann Georg Haag-Rutenberg	1830	1879	Germany	Coleoptera	
Wilhem de Haan	1801	1855	Netherlands	Polyneoptera	
Hermann August Hagen	1817	1893	Germany	Neuroptera, Odonata	
Ann Hajek	1952		United States		
James Nathaniel Halbert	1871	1948	Ireland		
Samuel Stehman Haldeman	1812	1880	United States	Coleoptera, Hymenoptera	
Alexander Henry Haliday	1807	1870	Ireland	Coleoptera, Diptera	
George Hampson	1860	1936	United Kingdom	Lepidoptera	
Anton Peter Josef Handlirsch	1865	1935	Austria	Palaeoentomology	
Dilbert Elmo Hardy	1914	2002	United States	Diptera	
Edgar von Harold	1830	1886	Germany	Coleoptera	
Henry Harpur-Crewe	1828	1883	United Kingdom	Lepidoptera	
Halbert Marion Harris	1900	2000	United States	Heteroptera: Nabidae	
Moses Harris	1731	1785	United Kingdom		
Thaddeus William Harris	1795	1856	United States		
Adam Hart			United Kingdom		
Michael Hassell	1942		United Kingdom		
Hermann Haupt	1873	1959	Germany	Hymenoptera	
Adrian Hardy Haworth	1767	1833	United Kingdom		
John Heath	1922	1987	United Kingdom		
Oswald Heer	1809	1883	Switzerland		
Ole Engel Heie	1926	2019	Denmark	Hemiptera: Aphidomorpha	
Bernd Heinrich	1940	present	United States	Coleoptera, Diptera, Hymenoptera, Lepidoptera, Odonata	
Carl Heinrich	1880	1955	United States	Lepidoptera	
Karl Borromaeus Maria Josef Heller	1864	1945	Austria	Coleoptera	
Johann Christian Ludwig Hellwig	1743	1831	Germany		
Friedrich Georg Hendel	1874	1936	Austria	Diptera	
Emil Hans Willi Hennig	1913	1976	Germany	Diptera	
Johann Friedrich Wilhelm Herbst	1743	1807	Germany	Coleoptera	
Claude Herbulot	1908	2006	France	Lepidoptera: Geometridae	
Hans Rudolf Herren	1947		Switzerland	Economic entomology	
Gottlieb August Wilhelm Herrich-Schäffer	1799	1874	Germany		
William Chapman Hewitson	1806	1878	United Kingdom	Coleoptera, Lepidoptera	
Lucas Friedrich Julius Dominikus von Heyden	1838	1915	Germany	Coleoptera	
Alexander Heyne	1869	1927	Germany	Lepidoptera	
Ernst Heyne	1833	1905	Germany	Lepidoptera	
Richard Hingston	1887	1966	United Kingdom		
H. E. Hinton	1912	1977	United Kingdom	Coleoptera	
Jacob Hoefnagel	1575	1630	Netherlands		
Johann Centurius Hoffmannsegg	1766	1849	Germany		
Martin Wyatt Holdgate	1931		United Kingdom		
Karl Holdhaus	1883	1975	Austria	Coleoptera	
William Jacob Holland	1848	1932	United States	Lepidoptera	
Bert Hölldobler	1936		Germany	Hymenoptera: Formicidae	
August Holmgren	1829	1888	Sweden	Hymenoptera	
Harry Hoogstraal	1917	1986	United States / Egypt	Acari, Ixodidae	
Frederick William Hope	1797	1862	United Kingdom	Coleoptera	
Marianne Horak	1944		Australia	Lepidoptera	
George Henry Horn	1840	1897	United States	Coleoptera	
Walther Horn	1871	1939	Germany	Coleoptera	
Leland Ossian Howard	1857	1950	United States	Economic entomology	
Jacob Hübner	1761	1826	Germany	Lepidoptera	
George Hudson	1867	1946	New Zealand		
Johann Siegfried Hufnagel	1724	1795	Germany	Lepidoptera	
Frank Montgomery Hull	1901	1982	United States	Diptera	
Carmel Humphries	1909	1986	Ireland		
Alphonse Hustache	1872	1942	France	Coleoptera: Curculionidae	
I					
Paulo Iide	1939	2012	Brazil	Diptera	
Johann Karl Wilhelm Illiger	1775	1813	Germany	Coleoptera	
Augustus Daniel Imms	1880	1949	United Kingdom		
Hiroshi Inoue	1917	2008	Japan	Lepidoptera: Zygaenidae	
J					
Carl Gustav Jablonsky	1756	1787	Germany	Coleoptera	
Jean-Charles Jacobs	1821	1907	Belgium	Diptera, Hymenoptera	
Georgiy Jacobson	1871	1926	Russia		
Pierre Nicolas Camille Jacquelin du Val	1828	1962	France	Coleoptera	
Tadeusz Jaczewski	1899	1974	Poland	Hemiptera	
René Jeannel	1879	1965	France	Coleoptera	
Anders Christian Jensen-Haarup	1863	1934	Denmark	Hymenoptera	
Thomas C. Jerdon	1811	1872	United Kingdom	Hymenoptera: Formicidae	
Claude-François Jeunet	1844		France	Lepidoptera	
Charles Willison Johnson	1852	1934	Ireland	Lepidoptera, Hymenoptera	
William Frederick Johnson	1863	1933	United States	Diptera	
James John Joicey	1871	1932	United Kingdom	Lepidoptera	
Karl Jordan	1861	1959	Germany	Siphonaptera, Coleoptera, Lepidoptera	
Peter Jörgensen	1870	1937	Denmark	Lepidoptera	
Louis Jurine	1751	1819	Switzerland	Coleoptera, Diptera	
K					
Vlasta Kálalová	1896	1971	Czech Republic (Czechoslovakia)		
Johann Heinrich Kaltenbach	1807	1876	Germany	Economic entomology	
Akito Y. Kawahara			United States		
William Francis de Vismes Kane	1840	1918	England / Ireland	Lepidoptera	
Ferdinand Anton Franz Karsch	1853	1936	Germany		
Masayo Kato	1898	1967	Japan		
David Keilin	1887	1963	United Kingdom		
Kálmán Kertész	1867	1922	Hungary	Diptera	
Bernard Kettlewell	1907	1979	United Kingdom	Lepidoptera	
Jean-Jacques Kieffer	1857	1925	France	Diptera, Hymenoptera	
Ernest August Hellmuth von Kiesenwetter	1820	1880	Germany	Coleoptera	
Shinsaku Kimoto	1933	2009	Japan	Coleoptera: Chrysomelidae	
Alfred Kinsey	1894	1956	United States	Hymenoptera: Cynipidae	
William Kirby	1759	1850	United Kingdom		
William Forsell Kirby	1844	1912	United Kingdom / Ireland	Lepidoptera	
Theodor Franz Wilhelm Kirsch	1818	1889	Germany	Coleoptera	
Ruud Kleinpaste	1952		Netherlands / New Zealand		
Johann Christoph Friedrich Klug	1775	1856	Germany	Lepidoptera	
Zoya Klyuchko	1933	2016	Ukraine	Lepidoptera	
Frederick Knab	1865	1918	Germany / United States		
Edward F. Knipling	1909	2000	United States	Economic entomology	
Carl Ludwig Koch	1778	1857	Germany		
Hermann Julius Kolbe	1855	1939	Germany	Coleoptera; Psocoptera; Neuroptera	
Vincenz Kollar	1797	1860	Germany	Diptera	
Hiromichi Kono	1905	1963	Japan	Coleoptera	
Friedrich Wilhelm Konow	1842	1908	Germany	Hymenoptera: Tenthredinidae	
Antun Korlević	1851	1915	Croatia	Hemiptera; Hymenoptera	
Ferdinand Kowarz	1838	1914	Austria	Diptera	
Ernst Gustav Kraatz	1831	1909	Germany	Coleoptera	
Karl Kraepelin	1848	1915	Germany		
Otto Kröber	1882	1969	Germany	Diptera	
Johann Gottlieb Kugelann	1753	1815	Germany	Coleoptera	
Philippe Alexandre Jules Künckel d'Herculais	1843	1918	France	Crop pests	
Nikolai Yakovlevich Kuznetsov	1873	1948	Russia	Lepidoptera; insect physiology	
L					
Joseph Alexandre Laboulbène	1825	1898	France		
Jean Théodore Lacordaire	1801	1870	Belgium	Coleoptera	
Jean-Pierre Lacroix	1938	1989	France	Coleoptera: Lucanidae	
Johann Nepomuk von Laicharting	1754	1797	Austria	Coleoptera	
Eric Laithwaite	1921	1997	United Kingdom	Lepidoptera	
Sven Lampa	1839	1914	Sweden	Lepidoptera	
Pierre André Latreille	1762	1833	France		
Maxim Lazarev	1985		Russia	Coleoptera: Cerambycidae	
John Eatton Le Conte	1784	1860	United States		
Arthur Mills Lea	1868	1932	Australia	Coleoptera	
William Elford Leach	1790	1836	United Kingdom		
Simon Leather	1955	2021	United Kingdom		
John Lawrence LeConte	1825	1883	United States	Coleoptera	
Julius Lederer	1821	1870	Austria	Lepidoptera	
John Henry Leech	1862	1900	England	Coleoptera, Lepidoptera	
Alexandre Louis Lefèbvre de Cérisy	1798	1867	France		
Andy Lehrer	1930	2014	Romania	Diptera	
Claude Lemaire	1921	2004	France	Lepidoptera: Saturniidae	
Amédée Louis Michel Lepeletier de Saint-Fargeau	1780	1845	France	Hymenoptera	
George Lewis	1839	1926	England	Coleoptera	
Max Liebke	1892	1947	Germany	Coleoptera	
K.O. Victoria Lieu			China	Aegeriidae, Cerambycidae	
Erwin Lindner	1888	1988	Germany	Diptera	
Carl H. Lindroth	1905	1979	Sweden	Coleoptera - Carabidae	
Carl Linnaeus	1707	1778	Sweden	Insecta. Linnaeus' works implemented a standardized binomial naming system for species.	
Joseph Albert Lintner	1820	1898	United States		
Paolo Lioy	1834	1911	Italy	Diptera	
Melchior de Lisle	1908	1977	France	Coleoptera: Lucanidae	
Hermann Loew	1807	1879	Germany	Diptera	
Cynthia Longfield	1896	1991	Ireland	Odonata	
Hippolyte Lucas	1814	1899	France		
Clara Southmayd Ludlow	1852	1924	United States	Medical entomology	
William Lundbeck	1863	1941	Denmark	Diptera	
Adolfo Lutz	1855	1940	Brazil	Medical entomology	
Enrique Lynch Arribálzaga	1856	1935	Argentina		
M					
Henry Christopher McCook	1837	1911	United States	Hymenoptera: Formicidae	
Robert McLachlan	1837	1904	United Kingdom	Neuroptera	
Alexander Macleay	1767	1848	United Kingdom		
William John Macleay	1820	1893	Australia		
William Sharp Macleay	1792	1865	United Kingdom		
Pierre-Justin-Marie Macquart	1778	1855	France	Diptera	
Barbara York Main	1929	2019	Australia	Arachnology	
Maurice Maindron	1857	1911	France		
Michael Majerus	1954	2009	United Kingdom	Lepidoptera	
René Malaise	1892	1978	Sweden		
John Russell Malloch	1875	1963	United Kingdom	Diptera	
Mahadeva Subramania Mani	1908	2003	India		
Josef Johann Mann	1804	1889	Austria / Czech Republic (Bohemia)	Lepidoptera	
Carl Gustaf von Mannerheim	1797	1854	Finland	Coleoptera	
Patrick Manson	1844	1922	Scotland	Medical entomology	
Oldřich Marek	1911	1986	Czech Republic (Czechoslovakia)	Coleoptera	
Pavel Iustinovich Marikovsky	1912	2008	Russia (USSR)	Hymenoptera: Formicidae; popular entomology	
Charles Lester Marlatt	1863	1954	United States	Economic entomology	
Sylvain Auguste de Marseul	1812	1890	France	Coleoptera	
George Frederick Leycester Marshall	1843	1934	United Kingdom	Lepidoptera	
Guy Anstruther Knox Marshall	1871	1959	India / United Kingdom		
Thomas Ansell Marshall	1827	1903	United Kingdom	Hymenoptera	
Thomas Marsham	1748	1819	United Kingdom	Coleoptera	
Fermín Martín Piera	1954	2001	Spain	Coleoptera	
Andrey Vasilyevich Martynov	1879	1938	Russia	Palaeoentomology; Trichoptera	
William Miles Maskell	1839	1898	New Zealand		
George Masters	1837	1912	Australia	Coleoptera	
Wayne Masterson	1959	1991	United Kingdom	Medical entomology	
Ryuichi Matsuda	1920	1986	Japan		
Shōnen Matsumura	1872	1960	Japan		
Andrew Matthews	1815	1897	United Kingdom	Coleoptera	
Karl Anton Epiphanius Matzek	1810	1843	Germany (Prussia)	Coleoptera: Nicrophorus	
Harold Maxwell-Lefroy	1877	1926	United Kingdom		
Gustav Mayr	1830	1908	Austria	Hymenoptera	
Erica McAlister			United Kingdom	Diptera	
James Francis McAlpine	1922	2019	Canada	Diptera	
Sidney McCrory	1911	1985	United States		
Richard Henry Meade	1814	1899	United Kingdom	Diptera	
Albert Stewart Meek	1871	1943	United Kingdom		
Jean Pierre Mégnin	1828	1905	France	Forensic entomology	
Johann Wilhelm Meigen	1764	1845	Germany	Diptera	
Johannes C. H. de Meijere	1866	1947	Netherlands	Diptera, Coleoptera	
Axel Leonard Melander	1878	1962	United States	Diptera, Hymenoptera	
Frederick Valentine Melsheimer	1749	1814	United States	Coleoptera	
Ernest Menault	1830	1903	France	Agricultural pests	
Édouard Ménétries	1802	1861	France / Russia	Lepidoptera, Coleoptera	
Maria Sibylla Merian	1647	1717	Germany		
Edward Meyrick	1854	1938	United Kingdom	Lepidoptera	
Charles Duncan Michener	1918	2015	United States	Hymenoptera	
Josef Mik	1839	1900	Austria / Czech Republic (Moravia)	Diptera	
David Miller	1890	1973	New Zealand	Diptera	
Pierre Millière	1811	1887	France	Lepidoptera	
Adolphe Philippe Millot	1857	1921	France	Lepidoptera	
Hayk Mirzayans	1920	1999	Iran		
Ludwig Mitterpacher	1734	1814	Hungary	Lepidoptera	
Alexander Mocsáry	1841	1915	Hungary	Hymenoptera	
Adolph Modéer	1738	1799	Sweden		
Frederic Moore	1830	1907	United Kingdom	Lepidoptera	
Clodoveo Carrión Mora	1883	1957	Ecuador		
August Feodorovich Morawitz	1837	1897	Russia	Coleoptera	
Ferdinand Ferdinandovich Morawitz	1827	1896	Russia	Hymenoptera	
Claude Morley	1874	1951	United Kingdom	Hymenoptera	
Derek Wragge Morley	1920	1969	United Kingdom	Hymenoptera: Formicidae	
Roger Morse	1927	2000	United States	Hymenoptera	
Kenneth Morton	1858	1940	United Kingdom	Odonata, Neuroptera	
Victor Ivanovich Motschulsky	1810	1871	Russia	Coleoptera	
Thomas Muffet	1552	1604	United Kingdom		
Johann Carl Megerle von Mühlfeld	1765	1840	Austria	Coleoptera	
Margaretta Morris	1797	1867	United States	Agricultural entomology	
Giuseppe Müller	1889	1964	Croatia	Coleoptera (Note that he published under both "Giuseppe" and "Josef")	
Otto Friedrich Müller	1730	1784	Denmark		
Étienne Mulsant	1797	1880	France		
Eugene G. Munroe	1919	2008	Canada		
Andrew Dickson Murray	1812	1878	Scotland	Coleoptera	
J. G. Myers	1897	1942	United Kingdom		
N					
Vladimir Nabokov	1899	1977	Russia / United States / Switzerland	Lepidoptera: mainly Lycaenidae	
Longinos Navás	1858	1938	Spain	Neuropteroidea	
Roger Naviaux	1926	2016	France	Coleoptera: Cicindelidae	
Yasushi Nawa	1857	1926	Japan		
Christian Gottfried Daniel Nees von Esenbeck	1776	1858	Germany		
Oleg Pavlovich Negrobov	1941	2021	Russia	Diptera: Dolichopodidae	
Edward Newman	1801	1876	United Kingdom		
L. Hugh Newman	1909	1993	United Kingdom	Lepidoptera	
George Newport	1803	1854	United Kingdom		
Lionel de Nicéville	1852	1901	United Kingdom	Lepidoptera	
Ebbe Schmidt Nielsen	1950	2001	Denmark		
John Nietner	1828	1874	Germany	Coleoptera	
Anton Franz Nonfried	1854	1923	Germany	Coleoptera	
Guido Nonveiller	1913	2002	Croatia	Coleoptera	
Kenneth Richard Norris	1914	2003	Australia		
William Noye	1814	1872	United Kingdom	Lepidoptera	
John Noyes	1949		United Kingdom	Hymenoptera: Chalcidoidea	
Charles George Nurse	1862	1933	United Kingdom	Lepidoptera, Hymenoptera	
O					
Eugene O'Mahoney	1899	1951	Ireland	Coleoptera, Mallophaga, Siphonaptera	
Jan Obenberger	1892	1964	Czech Republic (Czechoslovakia)	Coleoptera: Buprestidae	
Charles Oberthür	1845	1924	France	Lepidoptera	
René Oberthür	1852	1944	France	Coleoptera	
Georg Hermann Alexander Ochs	1887	1971	Germany	Coleoptera	
Ferdinand Ochsenheimer	1767	1822	Germany	Lepidoptera	
Thomas R. Odhiambo	1931	2003	Kenya	Medical entomology	
Lawrence Ogilvie	1898	1980	Bermuda / United Kingdom	Insects of Bermuda	
Harold Oldroyd	1914	1978	United Kingdom	Diptera	
Guillaume-Antoine Olivier	1756	1814	France		
Arthur Sidney Olliff	1865	1895	Australia		
Paul W. Oman	1908	1996	United States	Hemiptera	
Eleanor Anne Ormerod	1828	1901	United Kingdom		
Karl Robert Osten-Sacken	1828	1906	Russia / United States	Diptera: Tipulidae	
Dan Otte	1939		South Africa / United States	Orthoptera	
Ebenezer Oduro Owusu	1960		Ghana		
P					
Alpheus Spring Packard	1839	1905	United States		
Jiří Paclt	1925	2015	Czech Republic / Slovakia	Diplura, Collembola, Archaeognatha, Zygentoma	
André Paillot	1885	1944	France	insect pathology	
Ambroise Marie François Joseph Palisot, Baron de Beauvois	1752	1820	France		
Peter Simon Pallas	1741	1811	Germany (Prussia) / Russia	Coleoptera, Lepidoptera	
Charles E. Palm	1911	1996	United States		
Louis Pandellé	1824	1905	France	Coleoptera	
Georg Wolfgang Franz Panzer	1755	1829	Germany	Coleoptera	
Francis Polkinghorne Pascoe	1813	1893	United Kingdom	Coleoptera	
Carlo Passerini	1793	1857	Italy	Coleoptera	
Giovanni Passerini	1816	1893	Italy	Hemiptera	
Gustaf von Paykull	1757	1826	Sweden	Coleoptera	
Titian Peale	1799	1885	United States	Lepidoptera	
William Dandridge Peck	1763	1822	United States		
Edward Pelham-Clinton, 10th Duke of Newcastle-under-Lyne	1920	1988	United Kingdom	Lepidoptera	
Cyril Eugene Pemberton	1886	1975	United States	Economic entymology, Coleoptera, Hymenoptera	
Achille Rémy Percheron	1797	1869	France		
Louis Péringuey	1855	1924	France/South Africa	Coleoptera	
Robert Cyril Layton Perkins	1866	1955	United Kingdom	Hymenoptera	
Édouard Perris	1808	1878	France	Coleoptera; Diptera; Hemiptera	
Maximilian Perty	1804	1884	Germany		
Alexander Ivanovitch Petrunkevitch	1875	1964	Russia / United States	Arachnology; Hymenoptera: Apis mellifera	
Jeffery Pettis	1955		United States		
Cornelius Becker Philip	1900	1987	United States	Diptera	
Alfred Philpott	1870	1930	United Kingdom		
Maurice Pic	1866	1957	France	Coleoptera: Cerambycidae	
François Jules Pictet de la Rive	1809	1872	Switzerland		
W. Dwight Pierce	1881	1967	United States	Insect pests	
Elliot Pinhey	1910	2000	United Kingdom	Lepidoptera, Odonata	
Odorado Pirazzoli	1815	1884	Italy	Coleoptera	
Vasily Plotnikov	1878	1959	USSR (Uzbekistan)	Agricultural entomology, Orthoptera	
Carl Plötz	1814	1886	Germany	Lepidoptera	
Nikolaus Poda von Neuhaus	1723	1798	Austria	Insecta. Poda was the author of the first purely entomological work to follow the binomial nomenclature of Carl Linnaeus.	
Hans Pochon	1900	1977	Switzerland	Buprestidae	
George Poinar Jr.	1936		United States		
Yuri Alexandrovich Popov	1936	2016	USSR/Russia	Hemiptera	
Jules Putzeys	1809	1882	Belgium	Coleoptera - Carabidae	
Robert Michael Pyle	1947		United States	Lepidoptera	
Q					
Friedrich Otto Gustav Quedenfeldt	1817	1891	Germany	Coleoptera	
R					
Oktawiusz Bourmeister-Radoszkowski	1820	1895	Russia	Hymenoptera	
Constantine Samuel Rafinesque	1783	1840	France		
František Rambousek	1886	1931	Czech	Coleoptera, economic entomology	
Jules Pierre Rambur	1801	1870	France		
Maynard Jack Ramsay	1914	2005	United States	Economic entomology	
Alexandr Pavlovich Rasnitsyn	1936		Russia	Palaeoentomology; Hymenoptera	
Julius Theodor Christian Ratzeburg	1801	1871	Germany		
Pierre Réal	1922	2009	France	Lepidoptera: Nymphalidae: Morpho, Pieridae, Tortricidae	
René Antoine Ferchault de Réaumur	1683	1757	France		
Hans Rebel	1881	1940	Austria	Lepidoptera	
Ludwig Redtenbacher	1814	1876	Austria	Coleoptera	
Maurice Auguste Régimbart	1852	1907	France	Coleoptera	
Louis Jérôme Reiche	1799	1890	Netherlands / France	Coleoptera	
George Morrison Reid Henry	1891	1983	Sri Lanka	Orthoptera	
Hermann Reinhard	1816	1892	Germany	Hymenoptera	
Edmund Reitter	1845	1920	Germany	Coleoptera	
James Rennie	1787	1867	Scotland	General entomology, Lepidoptera	
Anders Jahan Retzius	1742	1821	Sweden		
Enzio Reuter	1867	1951	Finland	Lepidoptera	
Max Paul Riedel	1870	1941	Germany	Diptera	
Charles Valentine Riley	1843	1895	United States	Economic entomology	
Robert Henry Fernando Rippon	1816	1917	United Kingdom	Lepidoptera	
Friedrich Ris	1867	1931	Switzerland	Odonata	
Jean-Baptiste Robineau-Desvoidy	1799	1857	France	Diptera	
Harold E. Robinson	1932	2020	United States	Diptera	
Johann Jacob Roemer	1763	1819	Switzerland		
Alois Friedrich Rogenhofer	1831	1897	Austria	Lepidoptera	
Boris Borisovich Rohdendorf	1904	1977	Russia (USSR)	Palaeoentomology; Diptera	
Hermann Rolle	1864	1929	Germany	Lepidoptera, insect dealer	
Per Abraham Roman	1872	1943	Sweden	Hymenoptera	
Camillo Rondani	1808	1879	Italy	Diptera	
Joseph Pierre Rondou	1854	1935	France	Lepidoptera	
August Johann Rösel von Rosenhof	1705	1759	Germany		
Pietro Rossi	1738	1804	Italy	Odonata, Lepidoptera	
Charles Rothschild	1877	1923	United Kingdom	Siphonaptera	
Miriam Louisa Rothschild	1908	2005	United Kingdom	Siphonaptera	
Walter Rothschild, 2nd Baron Rothschild	1868	1937	United Kingdom	Lepidoptera	
S. A. von Rottemburg	1745	1797	Germany	Lepidoptera	
George Thomas Rudd	c. 1795	1847	United Kingdom	Coleoptera	
Gaston Ruter	1898	1979	France	Coleoptera: Scarabaeidae: Cetoniinae	
S					
Auguste Sallé	1820	1896	France	Coleoptera	
Osbert Salvin	1835	1898	United Kingdom		
Jaromír Šámal	1900	1942	Czechoslovakia	Ephemeroptera	
George Samouelle	1790	1846	United Kingdom	Lepidoptera	
Grace Sandhouse	1896	1940	United States	Apoidea	
Felix Santschi	1872	1940	Switzerland	Hymenoptera: Formicidae	
Ole A. Sæther	1936	2013	Norway	Diptera: Chironomidae	
Félicien Henry Caignart de Saulcy	1832	1912	France	Coleoptera	
William Wilson Saunders	1809	1879	United Kingdom	Lepidoptera, Hymenoptera	
Henri de Saussure	1829	1905	Switzerland	Hymenoptera, Orthoptera	
Thomas Say	1787	1834	United States		
Johann Gottlieb Schaller	1734	1814	Germany	Lepidoptera	
Hermann Rudolph Schaum	1819	1865	Germany	Coleoptera	
William Schaus	1858	1942	United States	Lepidoptera	
Johann Rudolph Schellenberg	1740	1806	Switzerland	Coleoptera, Diptera	
Ignaz Schiffermüller	1727	1806	Austria	Lepidoptera	
Ignaz Rudolph Schiner	1813	1873	Austria	Diptera	
Jørgen Matthias Christian Schiødte	1815	1884	Denmark		
Dietrich von Schlechtendal	1834	1916	Germany	Hymenoptera: Cynipidae	
Justin O. Schmidt	1947	2023	United States		
Otto Schmiedeknecht	1847	1936	Germany	Hymenoptera	
Heinrich Scholz	1812	1859	Germany	Hemiptera, Diptera	
Carl Johan Schönherr	1772	1848	Sweden	Coleoptera	
Franz von Paula Schrank	1747	1835	Germany		
Johann Christian Daniel von Schreber	1739	1810	Germany		
Arnold Schultze	1875	1948	Germany	Lepidoptera	
Theodor Emil Schummel	1786	1848	Germany	Diptera	
Boris Nikolayevich Schwanwitsch	1889	1957	Russia	Lepidoptera; General entomology; insect morphology	
Wolfgang Schwenke	1921	2006	Germany	Forest entomology; Hymenoptera: Ichneumonidae	
Giovanni Antonio Scopoli	1723	1788	Italy	Coleoptera	
Alexander Walker Scott	1800	1883	Australia		
John Scott	1823	1888	United Kingdom		
Samuel Hubbard Scudder	1837	1911	United States	Palaeoentomology; Lepidoptera; Orthoptera	
Eugène Séguy	1890	1985	France	Diptera	
Georg Karl Maria Seidlitz	1840	1917	Germany	Coleoptera	
Adalbert Seitz	1860	1938	Germany	Lepidoptera	
Edmond de Sélys Longchamps	1813	1900	Belgium	Odonata	
Andrey Petrovich Semyonov-Tyan-Shansky	1866	1942	Russia	Coleoptera	
Ronald A. Senior-White	1891	1954	United Kingdom	Diptera	
Seok Joo-myung	1908	1950	Korea	Lepidoptera	
David Sharp	1840	1922	United Kingdom	Coleoptera	
Herbert Kenneth Airy Shaw	1902	1985	United Kingdom		
Robert Walter Campbell Shelford	1872	1912	United Kingdom		
Shen Kuo	1031	1095	China	Insect pests and their natural enemies (predatory insects)	
Philip Sheppard	1921	1976	United Kingdom	Lepidoptera	
Jinshichi Shibuya			Japan	Lepidoptera	
Takashi Shirozu	1917	2004	Japan	Lepidoptera	
Aharon Shulov	1907	1997	Russia / Israel		
Frédéric Jules Sichel	1802	1868	France	Hymenoptera	
Victor Antoine Signoret	1816	1889	France	Hemiptera	
Sydney Skaife	1889	1976	South Africa	Hymenoptera	
Thomas Gibson Sloane	1858	1932	Australia	Coleoptera	
Frederick Smith	1805	1879	United Kingdom	Hymenoptera	
James Edward Smith	1759	1828	United Kingdom		
John Bernhardt Smith	1858	1912	United States		
Ray F. Smith	1919	1999	United States	Economic entomology	
Sidney Irving Smith	1843	1926	United States		
Roy Snelling	1934	2008	United States	Hymenoptera	
Robert Evans Snodgrass	1875	1962	United States		
Francis H. Snow	1840	1908	United States		
Maria Alma Solis	1956		United States	Lepidoptera	
Jinhaku Sonan	1892	1984	Japan	Lepidoptera, Hymenoptera: Ichneumonidae, insect pests of tea	
Marc Soula	1945	2012	France	Coleoptera: Scarabaeidae: Rutelinae	
Paul Gustav Eduard Speiser	1877	1945	Germany	Diptera	
William Spence	1783	1860	United Kingdom		
William Blundell Spence	1813	1900	United Kingdom		
Andrew Spielman	1930	2006	United States	Medical entomology	
Maximilian Spinola	1780	1857	France	Coleoptera, Hymenoptera, Hemiptera	
Marla Spivak	1955		United States	Hymenoptera	
Aleksandr Aleksandrovich Stackelberg	1897	1975	Russia (USSR)	Diptera	
Rasmus Carl Stæger	1800	1875	Denmark	Diptera	
Henry Tibbats Stainton	1822	1892	United Kingdom	Lepidoptera	
Carl Stål	1833	1878	Sweden	Hemiptera	
Hermann Friedrich Stannius	1808	1883	France	Diptera	
Otto Staudinger	1830	1900	Germany	Lepidoptera	
Pietro Stefanelli	1835	1919	Italy	Odonata, Lepidoptera	
Paul Stein	1852	1921	Germany	Diptera	
Samuel Friedrich Stein	1818	1885	Germany	Diptera	
Eduard Wilhelm Steinheil	1830	1879	Germany	Coleoptera	
James Francis Stephens	1792	1852	United Kingdom	Coleoptera	
Christian von Steven	1781	1863	Russia	Coleoptera; Lepidoptera	
Hans Ferdinand Emil Julius Stichel	1862	1936	Germany	Lepidoptera	
Caspar Stoll		1795	Netherlands		
Embrik Strand	1876	1947	Norway	Lepidoptera	
Nicholas Strausfeld	1942		United Kingdom / United States		
Ferdinand Heinrich Hermann Strecker	1836	1901	United States	Lepidoptera	
Edgar Harold Strickland	1889	1962	Canada	Diptera	
Gabriel Strobl	1846	1925	Austria	Diptera	
Henry Frederick Strohecker	1905	1988	United States	Coleoptera	
Brian Roy Stuckenberg	1930	2009	South Africa	Diptera	
Christian Wilhelm Ludwig Eduard Suffrian	1805	1876	Germany	Coleoptera	
Johann Heinrich Sulzer	1735	1813	Switzerland		
Jacques M. R. Surcouf	1873	1934	France	Diptera	
William Swainson	1789	1855	United Kingdom		
Jan Swammerdam	1637	1680	Netherlands		
Charles Swinhoe	1838	1923	United Kingdom	Lepidoptera	
Robert Swinhoe	1836	1877	United Kingdom		
Datuk Rahman Anwar Syed	1932	2009	Pakistan	Economic entomology	
Zoltán Szilády	1878	1947	Hungary	Diptera	
T					
Stephen Taber III	1924	2008	United States	Hymenoptera	
Ryoichi Takahashi	1898	1963	Japan	Hemiptera	
Sadao Takagi	1932		Japan	Hemiptera: Coccoidea	
George Talbot	1882	1952	England	Lepidoptera	
Ernst Ludwig Taschenberg	1818	1897	Germany		
August Michael Tauscher	1771	1841	Germany (Saxony)	Coleoptera, Lepidoptera	
Robert Templeton	1802	1892	Ireland		
Gilles Terral	1943	1998	France	Lepidoptera: Saturniidae	
Frederick Vincent Theobald	1868	1930	England	Diptera	
Nicolas Théobald	1903	1981	France	Paleo-Entomology	
Oskar Theodor	1898	1987	Israel	Diptera	
Cyrus Thomas	1825	1910	United States		
Michael C. Thomas	1948	2019	United States	Coleoptera	
F. Christian Thompson	1944	2021	United States	Diptera	
Carl Gustaf Thomson	1824	1899	Sweden	Coleoptera, Hymenoptera	
James Livingston Thomson	1828	1897	United States / France	Coleoptera	
Carl Peter Thunberg	1743	1828	Sweden	Coleoptera	
Robert John Tillyard	1881	1937	Australia	Odonata, Plecoptera, Neuroptera	
Philip Hunter Timberlake	1883	1981	United States	Hymenoptera	
Norman Tindale	1900	1993	Australia		
Friedrich F. Tippmann	1894	1974	Hungary	Coleoptera	
Sergiusz Graf von Toll	1893	1961	Poland		
André Léon Tonnoir	1885	1940	Belgium		
José Rollin de la Torre-Bueno (entomologist)	1871	1948	United States	Hemiptera	
Belindo Adolfo Torres	1917	1965	Argentina		
Maeda Toshiyasu	1799	1859	Japan	All orders	
Hervé de Toulgoët	1911	2009	France	Lepidoptera: Arctiinae	
Charles Henry Tyler Townsend	1863	1944	United States		
Adolfo Targioni Tozzetti	1823	1902	Italy	Hemiptera	
Roland Trimen	1840	1916	United Kingdom / South Africa		
Alessandro Trotter	1874	1967	Italy	Hymenoptera, Diptera	
Walter R. Tschinkel	1940		United States		
Tichon Sergeiewitsch Tschitscherine	1869	1904	Russia		
Iwasaki Tsunemasa	1786	1842	Japan	All higher orders	
Charles Henry Turner	1867	1923	United States	All orders	
J. W. Tutt	1858	1911	United Kingdom	Lepidoptera	
Peter Twinn	1916	2004	United Kingdom	Coleoptera	
U					
Philip Reese Uhler	1835	1913	United States	Hemiptera	
V					
Edward Payson Van Duzee	1861	1940	United States	Hemiptera	
Millard Carr Van Duzee	1860	1934	United States	Diptera	
Edwin Van Dyke	1869	1952	United States	Coleoptera	
Helmut Fritz van Emden	1933		United Kingdom	Agricultural entomology	
Pierre Léonard Vander Linden	1797	1831	Belgium		
Ruggero Verity	1883	1959	Italy	Lepidoptera	
George Henry Verrall	1855	1911	United Kingdom	Diptera	
Addison Emery Verrill	1839	1926	United States	Coleoptera	
Enrico Verson	1845	1927	Italy	Sericulture	
Carlo Vidano	1923	1989	Italy	Hemiptera: Auchenorrhyncha; Apiculture	
Pierre Viette	1921	2011	France	Lepidoptera	
Theodore Vigé	1867		France	Lepidoptera	
Joseph Villeneuve de Janti	1868	1944	France	Diptera	
W					
Sigbert Wagener	1919	2004	Germany	Lepidoptera	
David L. Wagner	1956		United States	Lepidoptera	
Johan August Wahlberg	1810	1856	Sweden	Coleoptera, Lepidoptera	
Peter Fredrik Wahlberg	1800	1877	Sweden		
Charles Athanase Walckenaer	1771	1852	France		
Francis Walker	1809	1874	United Kingdom		
James John Walker	1851	1939	United Kingdom		
Hans Daniel Johan Wallengren	1823	1894	Sweden		
Nadia Waloff	1909	2001	England		
Benjamin Dann Walsh	1808	1869	United States		
Joseph Waltl	1805	1888	Germany	Coleoptera	
Erich Wasmann	1859	1931	Austria / Netherlands	Hymenoptera: Formicidae; Isoptera; Myrmecophilous and termitophilous Coleoptera: mainly Staphylinidae	
Doug Waterhouse	1916	2000	Australia		
Frederick George Waterhouse	1815	1898	Australia		
George Robert Waterhouse	1810	1888	United Kingdom		
Friedrich Weber	1781	1823	Germany		
John Jenner Weir	1822	1894	United Kingdom	Lepidoptera	
Torkel Weis-Fogh	1922	1975	Denmark	Orthoptera	
Donald M. Weisman	1924	2016	United States		
Constantin Wesmael	1798	1872	Belgium	Hymenoptera	
Mary Jane West-Eberhard	1941		United States	Hymenoptera	
Bernt Wilhelm Westermann	1781	1868	Denmark		
John O. Westwood	1805	1893	United Kingdom	Hymenoptera: Formicidae	
George C. Wheeler	1897	1991	United States		
William Morton Wheeler	1865	1937	United States	Hymenoptera: Formicidae	
Amoret Whitaker			United Kingdom		
Adam White	1817	1879	United Kingdom		
Francis Buchanan White	1842	1894	United Kingdom		
Donald Robert Whitehead	1938	1990	United States		
Christian Rudolph Wilhelm Wiedemann	1770	1840	Germany	Diptera	
Vincent Wigglesworth	1899	1994	United Kingdom		
Benjamin Wilkes		c. 1749	United Kingdom	Lepidoptera	
Carrington Bonsor Williams	1889	1981	United Kingdom	Economic entomology, migration, ecology	
Carroll Williams	1916	1991	United States		
Samuel Wendell Williston	1851	1918	United States	Diptera	
E. O. Wilson	1929	2021	United States	Hymenoptera: Formicidae	
Johannes Winnertz	1800	1896	Germany	Diptera	
Wilhelm von Winthem	1799	1847	Germany	Diptera, Hymenoptera	
Heinrich Wolf	1924	2004	Germany	Hymenoptera	
Johann Friedrich Wolff	1778	1806	Germany	Hymenoptera	
Thomas Vernon Wollaston	1822	1878	United Kingdom	Coleoptera	
Charles W. Woodworth	1865	1940	United States	Economic entomology	
Thomas Workman	1844	1900	Ireland	Lepidoptera	
Frederik Maurits van der Wulp	1818	1899	Netherlands	Diptera	
Mark Alexander Wynter-Blyth	1906	1963	United Kingdom / India		
Philogène Auguste Galilée Wytsman	1866	1925	Belgium		
Y					
Vladimir Yakhontov	1899	1970	USSR (Uzbekistan)	Agricultural entomology, insect ecology, Thysanoptera	
Satyu Yamaguti	1894	1976	Japan	Diptera: Culicidae	
David Allan Young	1915	1991	United States	Hemiptera: Cicadellidae	
Z					
Aleksei Konstantinovich Zagulyaev	1924	2007	Russia (USSR)	Lepidoptera: Tineoidea	
Philipp Christoph Zeller	1808	1883	Germany		
Hans Zerny	1887	1945	Austria	Lepidoptera	
Johan Wilhelm Zetterstedt	1785	1875	Sweden	Diptera, Hymenoptera	
Rustem Devletovich Zhantiev	1937		Russia	Coleoptera: Dermestidae; insect ecology and physiology (acoustic communication, orientation, neurophysiology)	
Daniel Ziegler	1804	1876	United States		
Elwood Zimmerman	1912	2004	United States	Coleoptera	
Johann Leopold Theodor Friedrich Zincken	1770	1856	Germany		
Fritz Konrad Ernst Zumpt	1908	1985	Germany / South Africa	Diptera	

== See also ==
- List of Estonian entomologists
