= Desvignes =

Desvignes is a French surname. Notable people with the surname include:

- Lucette Desvignes (1926–2024), French writer
- Margot Desvignes
- Peter Hubert Desvignes
- Pierre Desvignes (1764–1827), French composer
- Thomas Desvignes (1812–1868), English entomologist
- Fabrice Desvignes (born 1972), French chef, winner of the 2007 Bocuse d'Or

== See also ==
- Sidney Desvigne
