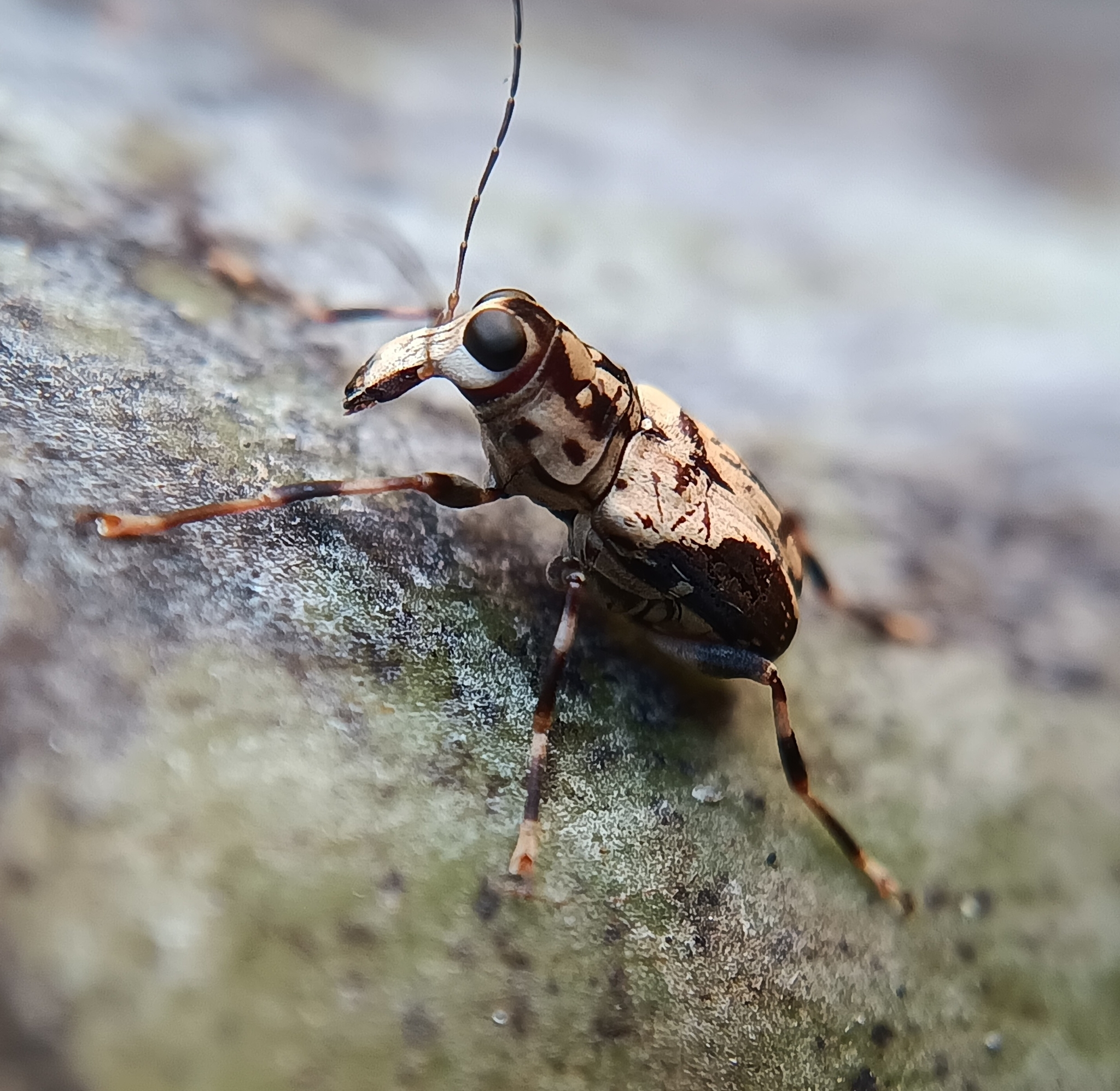

Scientific classification
- Kingdom: Animalia
- Phylum: Arthropoda
- Class: Insecta
- Order: Coleoptera
- Suborder: Polyphaga
- Infraorder: Cucujiformia
- Family: Anthribidae
- Genus: Litocerus
- Species: L. plagiatus

Binomial name
- Litocerus plagiatus Jordan, 1895

= Litocerus plagiatus =

Species of beetle

Litocerus plagiatus is a weevil in the genus Litocerus, which contains other weevil species with similar morphological traits. This weevil is characterized by its distinctive yellow-ochreous and black patterns, red hues, and lack of a tubercle on its abdomen.

== Etymology ==
In the genus Litocerus, lito- comes from the Greek prefix lithos meaning "stone" and -cerus comes from the Greek suffix -kerōs meaning "horned one". In the species name plagiatus, plagi- comes from the Greek prefix plagio- meaning "slanting, oblique" and -atus comes from Latin and indicates the possession of a thing or feature.

== Discovery ==
Samples of the species Litocerus plagiatus were collected by John Whitehead in 1894 during his exploration of northern Luzon, Philippines. The new species was first described by Karl Jordan in the journal Entomologische Zeitung in 1895.

== Appearance ==
This species has large eyes and a body mimicking wood. It has a long snout and a segmented red antenna. The body is primarily black and yellow ochre with red rings around the legs.

The pronotum was described by Karl Jordan to be similar to the species Litocerus dorsalis. However, the sides are less carinate, the back is gradually convex, and the lateral angles are at a right angle. The apex is rounded, and the front is bent. There is also a broad central stripe that runs down and narrows behind the carina. A dotted line with three lateral points was observed at the apical, median, and basal.

The elytra narrow in the back and are reddish with yellow-ochrease tomentose patches. A lateral median patch extends from the third interspace and contains many yellow-ochreous spots. Black spots at the posterior end of the elytra are distinguishing features. The pygidium is triangular with a rounded tip, colored red with a dark brown central stripe.

The abdomen is marked by black spots on each side. The first segment lacks a tubercle.

Length 7mm, elytra 4.5 mm, width 2.5 mm.

== Subspecies ==
Four subspecies of the species Litocerus plagiatus exist. According to Boris Büche's speculations these might just be color morphs.

=== Litocerus plagiatus semnus ===
Litocerus plagiatus semnus is a subspecies of species Litocerus plagiatus and was first collected by W. Doherty in Palawan, Philippines and described in 1923 by Karl Jordan. The female specimens were described in Latin as having almost black feet and the second segment of the ankles not being red. On the pronotum, the median gray stripe is narrower than the antescutellar spot, with small lateral spots present. The sutural area of the elytra has a short, narrow postmedian lobe.

The male specimen was described as having a median stripe of the pronotum that is slightly broader than in Litcoerus plagiatus doximus. The postmedian projection os the sutural area is narrow and reaches only the sixth interspace. The elytra and side of the pronotum are black with markings that are slightly abraded.

=== Litocerus plagiatus doximus ===
Litocerus plagiatus doximus is a subspecies of the species Litocerus plagiatus and was first collected by Hans Fruhstorrfer in November-December of 1895 and first described in 1923 by Karl Jordan. It was collected in Toli-Toli, North Celebes.

==== Appearance ====
The median gray stripe of the pronotum is about as wide as the antescutellar spot, is constricted at the carina, and about half as wide as the straight dark brown stripes. The antennae and legs are darker reddish brown than in Litocerus plagiatus plagiatus. The pubescence (short hairs on the insect) is very light gray with little trace of yellow. Similar to Litocerus plagiatus plagiatus, the grey sutural area of the elytra extended from base to apex with a large triangular brown, black area. This area almost touches the sutural line of punctures and encloses a large grey limbal spot and a smaller dot behind it. a large reniform brown-black spot located before the apex reaches the sutural stripe and encloses a small gray sub limbal spot and two small dashes. Between those two patches the gray sutural area extends to the lateral margin as a narrow uninterrupted oblique band. There is a row of lateral spots on the abdomen, and two lateral brown spots on the metasternum.

== See also ==
- Beetle
- Endemism
- Entomology
- List of entomologists
- Taxonomy (biology)
