= Emil von Brück =

German entomologist

Emil von Brück (1807 in Krefeld – 1884 in Krefeld) was a German dealer and entomologist mainly interested in Coleoptera.

Brück led an extensive correspondence with the coleopterists of his time, especially Ernst Gustav Kraatz, Lucas von Heyden, Ernest August Hellmuth von Kiesenwetter and Alexander Henry Haliday. He made collecting trips to Italy and Spain and financially supported the expeditions of Gustav Zebe into the Balkans, Greece and Crete.

The expeditions to Spain were in the spring of 1868 and 1870, when he met Lucas von Heyden in Granada. He collected in Gibraltar, Puerto Santa Maria, Seville, Alicante, Málaga, Cartagena and Valencia.

He became a member of the Netherlands Entomological Society in 1853 and in 1858 joined the Entomological Society of Berlin.
