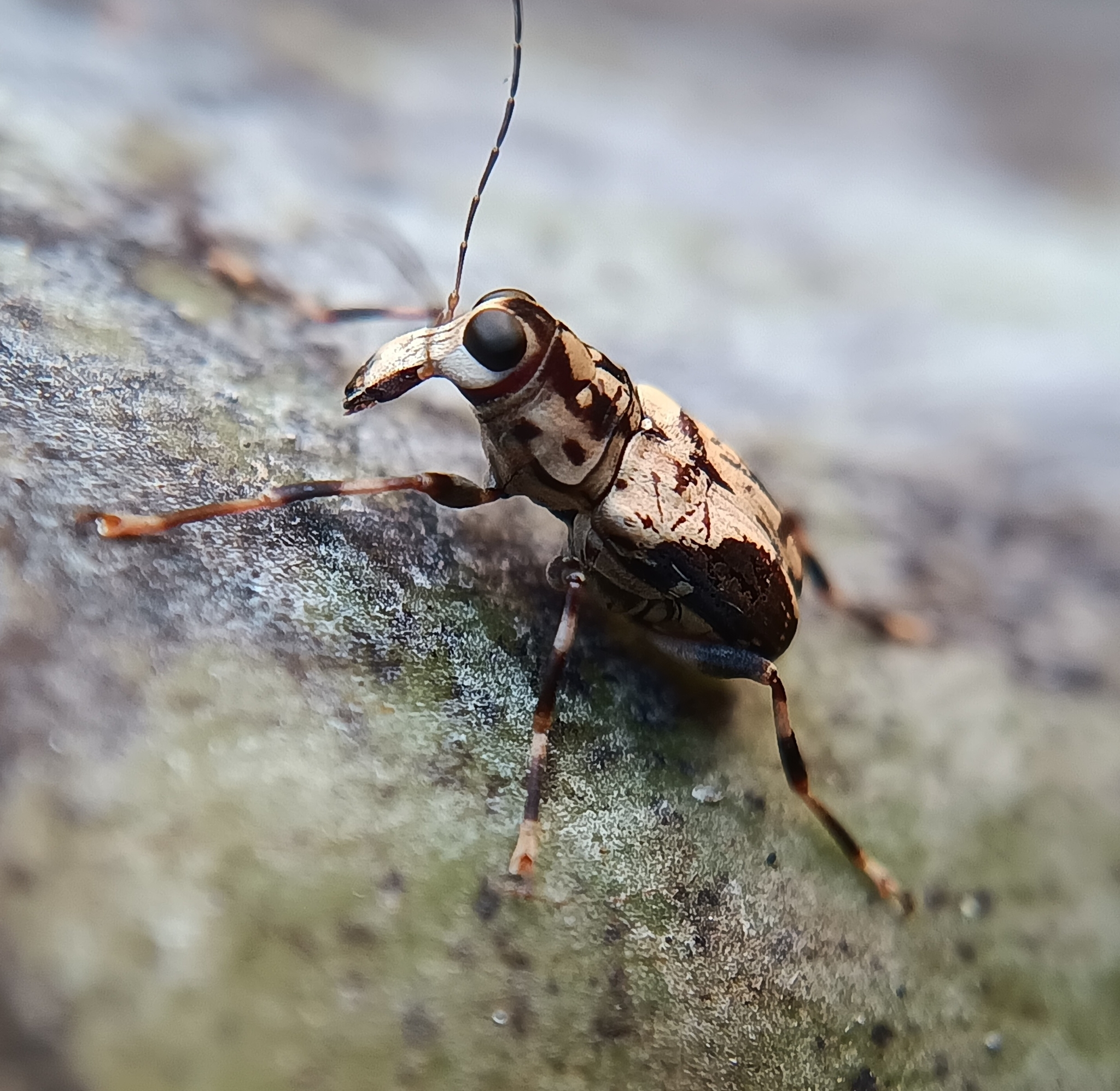
- Litocerus plagiatus

Scientific classification
- Kingdom: Animalia
- Phylum: Arthropoda
- Clade: Pancrustacea
- Class: Insecta
- Order: Coleoptera
- Suborder: Polyphaga
- Infraorder: Cucujiformia
- Superfamily: Curculionoidea
- Family: Anthribidae
- Genus: Litocerus; C.J.Schoenherr, 1833

= Litocerus =

Genus of beetles

Litocerus is a genus of beetles belonging to the Anthribidae family.

== Discovery ==
The genus Litocerus was first described by the entomologist Carl Johan Schönherr in his 1833 work titled, Genera et species curculionidum, cum synonymia hujus familiæ. The first species found was Litocerus histrio.

== Species ==
- Litocerus adelphus Wolfrum, 1945-48
- Litocerus alternans Jordan, 1928
- Litocerus alternus Jordan, 1926
- Litocerus ambustus Wolfrum, 1949
- Litocerus ampliatus Jordan, 1933
- Litocerus anatinus Jordan, 1901
- Litocerus ancoralis Heller, 1925
- Litocerus andamanicus Jordan, 1913
- Litocerus anna Jordan, 1903
- Litocerus annulipes Jordan, 1895
- Litocerus balli Olliff, 1889
- Litocerus beninus Jordan, 1922
- Litocerus benitensis Jordan, 1903
- Litocerus bicuspis Jordan, 1912
- Litocerus callias Jordan, 1911
- Litocerus celebensis Jordan, 1911
- Litocerus ceriger Jordan, 1930
- Litocerus chorispilus Jordan, 1926
- Litocerus communis Jordan, 1912
- Litocerus confatalis Jordan, 1924
- Litocerus crassus Jordan, 1897
- Litocerus crucicollis Jordan, 1895
- Litocerus crux-andreae Heller, 1919
- Litocerus cryptus Jordan, 1903
- Litocerus decellei Frieser, R., 1975
- Litocerus didymus Jordan, 1923
- Litocerus dividus Jordan, 1933
- Litocerus dorsalis Jordan, 1894
- Litocerus doximus Jordan, 1923
- Litocerus dysallus Jordan, 1912
- Litocerus effatus Jordan, 1923
- Litocerus exornatus Jordan, 1922
- Litocerus fasciatus M'Leay, 1886
- Litocerus fidelis Jordan, 1922
- Litocerus figuratus Pascoe, 1859
- Litocerus filicornis J. Thomson, 1858
- Litocerus flexosus Bovie, 1905
- Litocerus flexuosus Jordan Jordan, 1895
- Litocerus fluviatilis Jordan, 1904
- Litocerus forticornis Jordan, 1898
- Litocerus foveolatus Jordan, 1894
- Litocerus fraternus Jordan, 1926
- Litocerus fuliginosus (Olivier, A.G., 1800)
- Litocerus gemellus Jordan, 1895
- Litocerus glebula Jordan, 1926
- Litocerus granulatus Jordan, 1903
- Litocerus gyrus Wolfrum, 1955
- Litocerus haemaris Jordan, 1912
- Litocerus hamearis Jordan, 1912
- Litocerus helictus Jordan, 1911
- Litocerus histrio Gyllenhal in Schoenherr, 1833
- Litocerus humeralis Jordan, 1894
- Litocerus inclinans Jordan, 1895
- Litocerus includens Frieser, R., 1983
- Litocerus inermis Jordan, 1895
- Litocerus infans Jordan, 1901
- Litocerus infirmus Jordan, 1928
- Litocerus inflexus Frieser, R., 1992
- Litocerus insignis Jordan, 1894
- Litocerus interpositus Frieser, R., 1975
- Litocerus jacobsoni Jordan, 1912
- Litocerus javanicus Jordan, 1895
- Litocerus jordani Gahan, 1900
- Litocerus khasianus Jordan, 1903
- Litocerus kinurai Shibata, 1970
- Litocerus kuehni Jordan, 1903
- Litocerus laticollis Jordan, 1894
- Litocerus leucomelas Jordan, 1926
- Litocerus leucospilus Jordan, 1903
- Litocerus leucostictus Klug, 1833
- Litocerus longinonus Jordan, 1942
- Litocerus luteus Frieser, R., 2008
- Litocerus macrophthalmus (Montrouzier, 1857)
- Litocerus maculatus (Olivier, A.G., 1800)
- Litocerus mentawensis Jordan, 1897
- Litocerus miles Jordan, 1926
- Litocerus mocquerysi Jordan, 1894
- Litocerus moestificus Fahraeus in Shoenherr, 1839
- Litocerus moestus Pascoe, 1859
- Litocerus muehlei Frieser, R., 1993
- Litocerus multiguttatus Shibata, 1970
- Litocerus multilineatus Kirsch, 1875
- Litocerus nigritarsis Jordan, 1894
- Litocerus nigriventris Jordan, 1895
- Litocerus nilgiriensis Jordan, 1909
- Litocerus notalis Jordan, 1931
- Litocerus obscurus Jordan, 1894
- Litocerus parakensis Jordan, 1894
- Litocerus perplexus Pascoe, 1860
- Litocerus petilus Jordan, 1933
- Litocerus phelus Jordan, 1925
- Litocerus philippinensis Jordan, 1895
- Litocerus phygus Jordan, 1939
- Litocerus plagiatus Jordan, 1895
- Litocerus plagifer Jordan, 1897
- Litocerus planirostris Jordan, 1894
- Litocerus pollionis Jordan, 1933
- Litocerus propinquus Wolfrum, 1949
- Litocerus puncticollis Jordan, 1898
- Litocerus quinarius Jordan, 1932
- Litocerus quivarius Jordan, 1932
- Litocerus rajah Jordan, 1911
- Litocerus rhodesiensis Jordan, 1922
- Litocerus rhombicus Jordan, 1908
- Litocerus scutellaris Jordan, 1894
- Litocerus segmentatus Heller, 1919
- Litocerus sellatus Pascoe, 1859
- Litocerus semnus Jordan, 1923
- Litocerus senniger Jordan, 1930
- Litocerus socius Jordan, 1901
- Litocerus stichoderes Jordan, 1926
- Litocerus stichus Jordan, 1924
- Litocerus sticticus Jordan, 1904
- Litocerus striatus Jordan, 1894
- Litocerus suturalis Jordan, 1895
- Litocerus tagens Jordan, 1933
- Litocerus takemurai Nakane, 1963
- Litocerus tenuipictus Heller, 1925
- Litocerus thaus Jordan, 1923
- Litocerus timius Jordan, 1938
- Litocerus tokarensis Shibata, 1970
- Litocerus torosus Pascoe, 1860
- Litocerus vagulus Jordan, 1924
- Litocerus vallestris Frieser, R., 2001
- Litocerus variegatus Jordan, 1894
- Litocerus vestitus Jordan, 1915
- Litocerus virgulatus Jordan, 1915
- Litocerus xenopus Jordan, 1931
- Litocerus ypsilon Jordan, 1911
- Litocerus zosterius Jordan, 1923

== See also ==
- List of Anthribidae genera
