= Eugene O'Mahony =

Irish museum curator and entomologist

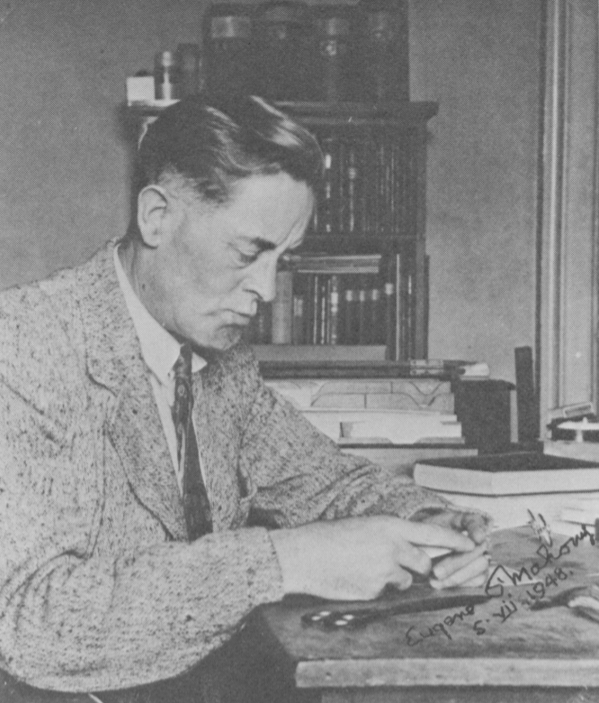
- O'Mahony in 1948
- Born: 1899; County Limerick, Ireland
- Died: 21 June 1951 (aged 51–52); Dublin
- Scientific career
- Fields: Natural history

Eugene O'Mahony (1899 - 21 June 1951) was an Irish museum curator and entomologist who worked on Coleoptera, Mallophaga and Siphonaptera.

== Early life ==
Eugene O'Mahony was born County Limerick in 1899. He moved to Dublin as a child, and due to ill health he did not attend school. He suffered from multiple neurofibromata later in his life. Before taking up his job in the museum, O'Mahony described himself as an electrical engineer.

== Museum career ==
O'Mahony worked in the Natural History Museum, Dublin, being appointed as a Technical Assistant in 1922. He worked with Albert Russell Nichols, James Nathaniel Halbert and Arthur Wilson Stelfox, having been trained by Halbert alongside Stelfox. After the retirement of Nichols and Halbert, O'Mahony was one of only two staff members of the museum from 1924 to 1930. Stelfox contends that O'Mahony had considerable duties and at times had sole responsibility for the zoological collections, despite never rising above the position of Technical Assistant which was the lowest grade of staff in the museum and never receiving an increase in his salary. He was offered a post in Canada as a forest entomologist, the offer of which he attempted to use to make his position more permanent. This wasn't successful, and he ultimately turned down the post in Canada, a decision he expressed much regret about. He was unsuccessful in securing a permanent position in the museum owing to slim resources in the museum and his lack of a university qualification. After Stelfox retired in the late 1940s his duties again increased, and despite University College Dublin awarding him a Masters in Science for his published work, the museum only offered him a permanent post as a Senior Attendant after colleagues and peers had lobbied the Minister for Education, Richard Mulcahy. He refused this offer as it would require him to wear a uniform and invigilate the museum's galleries.

O'Mahony wrote over fifty articles on Irish Coleoptera between 1924 and 1951 (listed in Ryan et al. (1984) pp. 80–83.) Most appeared in the Entomologist's Monthly Magazine and many introduced new national and county records. Alongside Stelfox, Beirne in his Irish entomology: the first hundred years, that O'Mahony was one of the most important figures in Irish entomology from the 1920s until his death. He also wrote about a light-coloured form of the common house mouse living on North Bull.

O'Mahony was a founding member of the Dublin Rifle Club and won medals for rifle shooting, as well as being an active member of the Clontarf Yacht Club. He also volunteered with the precursor to the Irish Navy from 1939 to 1945, and was awarded a non-commissioned rank of a Chief Petty Officer and Instructor in the Maritime Inscription Corps. He was a cabinet maker, and made numerous insect cabinets for the entomological collections of the museum as well as slide cabinets and ship models. O'Mahony was a nationalist, and had a number of portraits to the leaders of the Easter Rising in his museum office, and in his youth he had guarded IRA weapons dumps in sandhills on Dublin Bay.

== Later life and death ==
He was engaged in the late 1940s, but after a number of attempts to secure a permanent job with a pension, he broke off the engagement. He drank increasingly more alcohol and developed stomach and heart conditions. He died on 21 June 1951, from a perforated ulcer. He predeceased his parents and siblings.

== Collections ==
The O'Mahony collection of 12,209 species was donated to the Hope Department of Entomology, University Museum, Oxford after his death. The collection is accompanied by manuscript material including a notebook titled 'Records of beetles in Co. Dublin (North East)' and there is some correspondence. The deposition of O'Mahony's collection resulted from Stelfox advising his family not to give the collection to the British Museum, as O'Mahony had requested. Like Stelfox, O'Mahony had arranged for his personal collections to be deposited in collections outside Ireland. This was despite the collections being amassed during their official duties, and Beirne surmised that this was in retaliation to the perceived poor treatment that O'Mahony and Stelfox received during their careers at the museum. The collection was later returned to the Natural History Museum, Dublin in 1984.

== Works ==
- Coleoptera in Praeger R.L. (ed.) Report on recent additions to the Irish fauna and flora (terrestrial and freshwater) Proc. R. Irish Academy, 93(B), pp. 22–36(1929).
