= Matzek =

Matzek is a surname. Notable people with the surname include:

- Karl Anton Epiphanius Matzek (1810–1843), Prussian entomologist
- Karl Matzek (1895–1983), Austrian artist
- Mike Matzek (born 1965), American gymnast
- Tyler Matzek (born 1990), American baseball pitcher
- Virginia Matzek, American ecologist
