= Litocerus adelphus =

Scientific classification
- Kingdom: Animalia
- Phylum: Arthropoda
- Class: Insecta
- Order: Coleoptera
- Suborder: Polyphaga
- Infraorder: Cucujiformia
- Family: Anthribidae
- Genus: Litocerus
- Species: L. adelphus

Binomial name
- Litocerus adelphus Litocerus adelphus - Wolfrum 1945

Species of fungus weevil

Litocerus adelphus is a species of fungus weevil in the family Anthribidae. The species was first described by Wolfrum between 1945 and 1948.
