= William Monod Crawford =

Irish entomologist (1872–1941)

William Monod Crawford (1872–1941) was an Irish colonial civil servant in India and an entomologist.

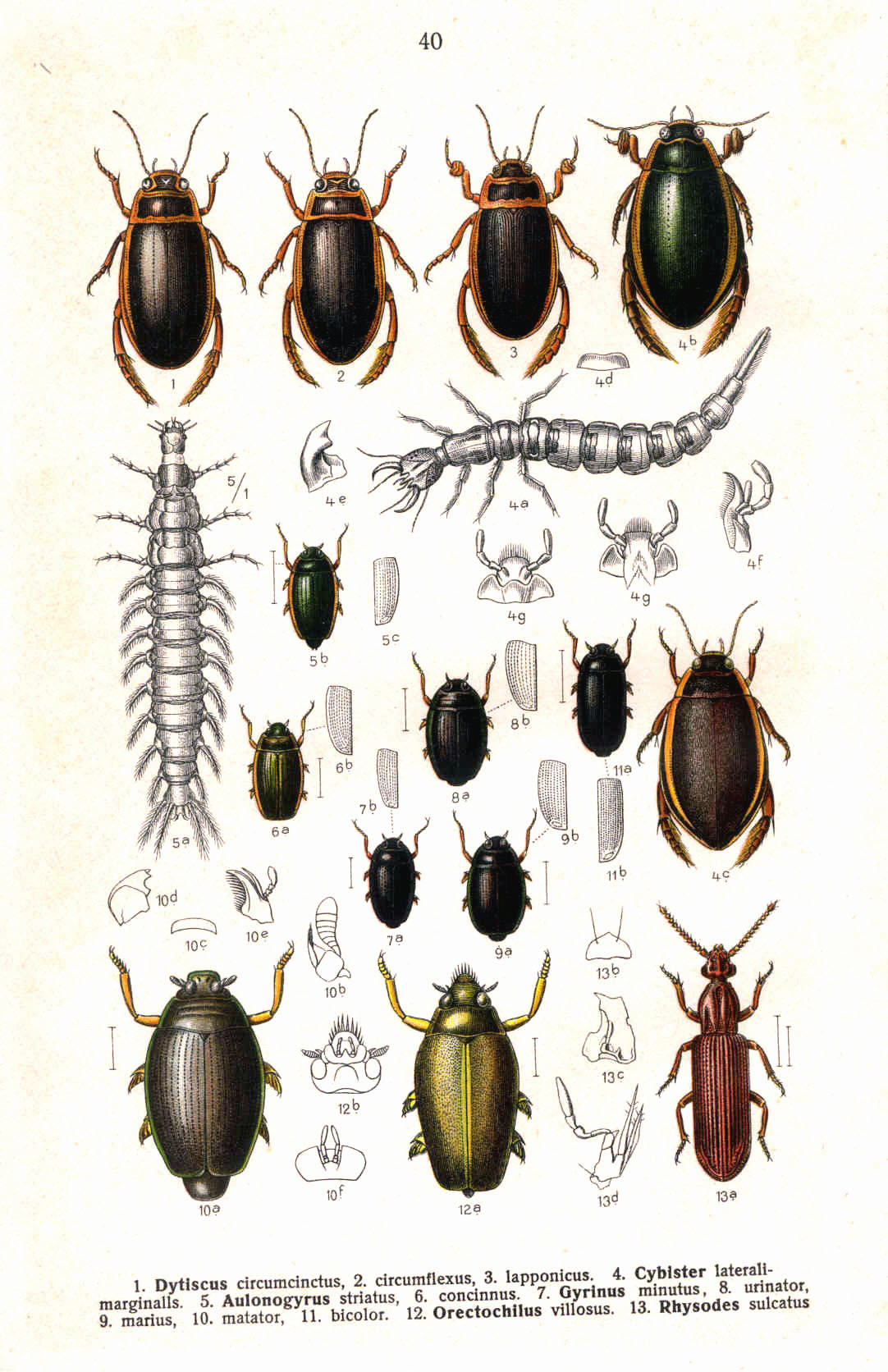
Plate from Edmund Reitter's Die Käfer des Deutschen Reiches a work owned by Crawford

William Monod Crawford's father was a wealthy linen manufacturer. He was born in Paris on 31 October 1872, living there until he was sixteen when the family returned to Ireland. He served in the Indian Civil Service from 1895 to 1919, in which year he returned to Ireland in 1919 to live in Belfast. After 1919, he undertook various contracts for the Dunlop Rubber Company mainly in Burma. During his years in India and Burma, Crawford collected Lepidoptera.

Between 1921 and his death, Crawford was a prolific author of notes on Irish insects. His main interests were Coleoptera and Lepidoptera. Many of his notes concerned migrant moths and butterflies, and he documented the occurrences of several rare hawk moths including the only Northern Ireland record of Hippotion celerio also known as the silver-striped hawk-moth. He discovered the small eggar in County Fermanagh in 1928. He also amassed a large collection of Irish Coleoptera. He specialised in the Dytiscidae.

His extensive collection of butterflies from the Indian sub-continent is in the Ulster Museum, Belfast. His beetle collection, merged with that of William Frederick Johnson, is in the same repository.

He died on 2 April 1941, aged 69. An obituary appeared in the Irish Naturalists' Journal.

== See also ==
- List of butterflies of India
