= Feng Lanzhou =

- 冯兰洲
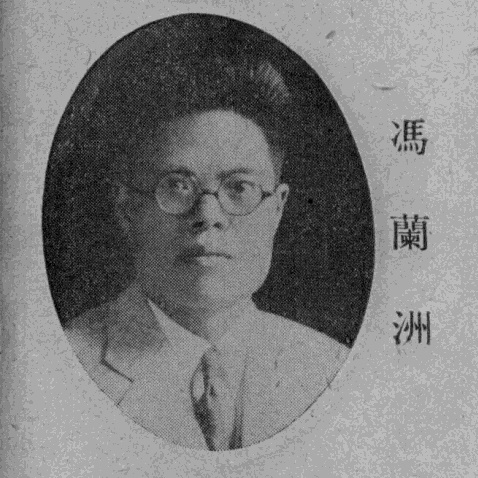
- Feng in 1937
- Born: 24 August 1903; Linqu County, Shandong, Qing China
- Died: 29 January 1972 (aged 68); Beijing, China
- Education: Cheeloo University
- Scientific career
- Fields: Entomology
- Workplaces: Peking Union Medical College

Chinese name
- Simplified Chinese: 冯兰洲
- Traditional Chinese: 馮蘭洲
Transcriptions
Standard Mandarin
- Hanyu Pinyin: Féng Lánzhōu

Feng Lanzhou (24 August 1903 – 29 January 1972) was a Chinese entomologist who was director of the Institute of Parasitic Diseases, Chinese Academy of Medical Sciences from 1958 to 1960. He was an academician of the Chinese Academy of Sciences.

== Biography ==
Feng was born in the town of Jiangyu, in Linqu County, Shandong, on 24 August 1903. He secondary studied at Shoushan High School (守善中学). In 1920, he was admitted to Cheeloo University, majoring in medical science. Between 1925 and 1927, he was assistant for the Kala-Azar Delegation of the Royal Society in Jinan.

After university, he was hired by Peking Union Medical College as an assistant. In 1932, he first identified anopheles minimus as the main vector of malaria in southern China. In August 1933, he went to study at the Liverpool School of Tropical Health in England for half a year. In 1936, he published the survey results of filariasis in China, which proved for the first time that anopheles hyrcanus var.sinensis was an important vector of Malay filariasis in China. In 1941, after the Pearl Harbor Incident, Peking Union Medical College was closed by the Imperial Japanese Army. He joined the faculty the Department of Parasitology, Peking University Medical College as the chief professor, and served as a researcher in the Pharmaceutical Factory affiliated to Tianjin East Asia Wool Weaving Factory (天津东亚毛织厂附属药厂) to study the purification of effective components of areca catechu. When Peking Union Medical College was officially reopened to the public in 1947, he was recalled to the original department, becoming associate professor in 1947 and to full professor in 1952. He became director of the Institute of Parasitic Diseases, Chinese Academy of Medical Sciences in 1958, then returned to Peking Union Medical College in 1960, working there until his death in 1972.

On 29 January 1972, he died of illness in Beijing, aged 68.

== Honours and awards ==
- 1957 Member of the Chinese Academy of Sciences (CAS)
