= Carlo Vidano =

Italian entomologist

Carlo Vidano (1923–1989) was an Italian entomologist who specialised in Auchenorrhyncha. Vidano was born in Caluso and attended the University of Turin, graduating from the Faculty of Agriculture in 1949. He was immediately appointed assistant professor to the chair of Agricultural Entomology in Turin. In 1968, he became a full professor of Apiculture. He died in Turin.
