= Sigbert Wagener =

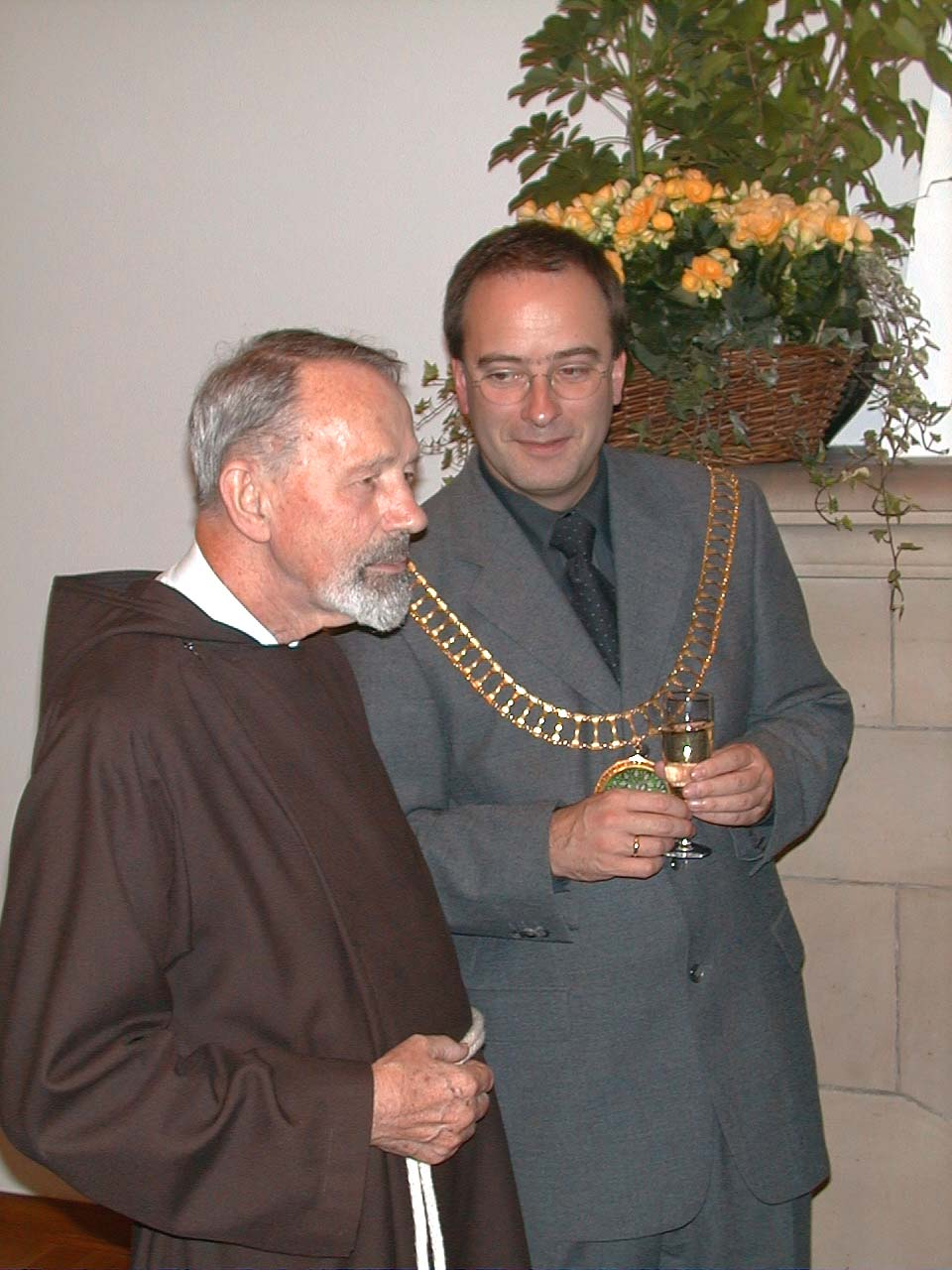
Klaus Ehling and Sigbert Wagener, 2001.

Pater Sigbert Wagener (OFMCap) (29 October 1919 in Krefeld as Karl Emil Wagener – 13 April 2004) was a German Capuchin priest, a teacher, a scientist and naturalist especially interested in entomology. He wrote (partial list)

- Monographie der ostasiatischen Formen der Gattung Melanargia Meigen (Lepidoptera, Satyridae) Lfg.1, Schweizerbart 1959
- Monographie der ostasiatischen Formen der Gattung Melanargia Meigen (Lepidoptera, Satyridae) Lfg. 2, Schweizerbart 1959
- Monographie der ostasiatischen Formen der Gattung Melanargia Meigen (Lepidoptera, Satyridae) Lfg. 3, Schweizerbart 1959
- Bemerkungen zu den Parnassius-Formen des Appenin aus geographisch-ökologischer Sicht (Papilionidae) Nota lepid. 1 (1) 23–37 1977
- Die Tagfalter der Türkei unter Berücksichtigung der angrenzenden Länder, with Gerhard Hesselbarth, Harry van Oorschot, Goecke & Evers 1995, ISBN 3-931374-29-7
