= Theodore Vigé =

French lepidopterist

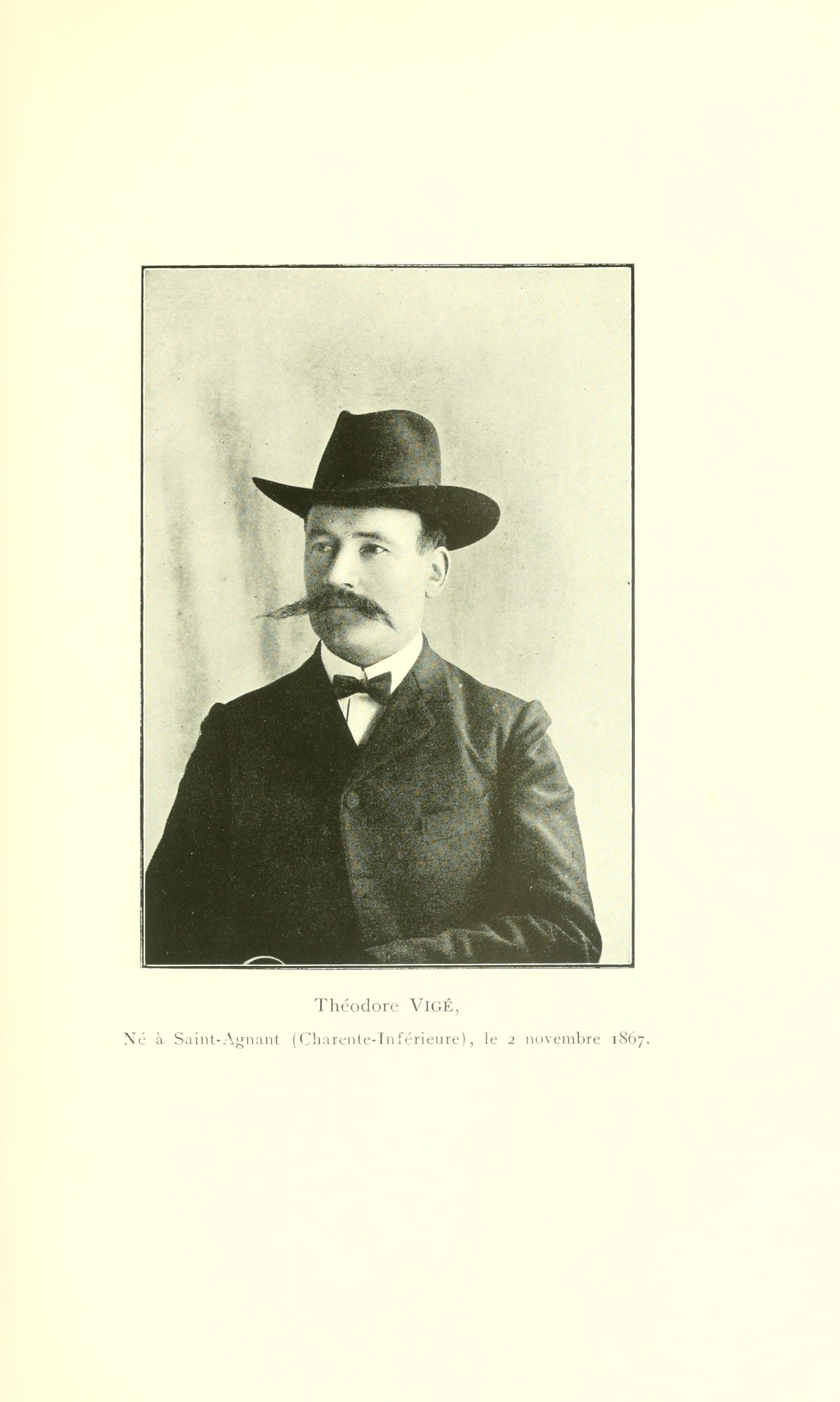
Theodore Vige

Theodore Vigé (2 November 1867, Saint-Agnante (Charent-Inferieure)– ?) was a French entomologist who specialised in Lepidoptera. He was a contributor to Catalogue des lépidoptères observés dans l'ouest de la France (région atlantique d'altitude inférieure à 300 mètres) par Henri Gelin & Daniel Lucas. Theodore Vigé was a Member of the Société Entomologique de France. He lived in Dompierre-sur-Mer.
