= Hans Pochon =

Swiss entomologist (1900–1977)

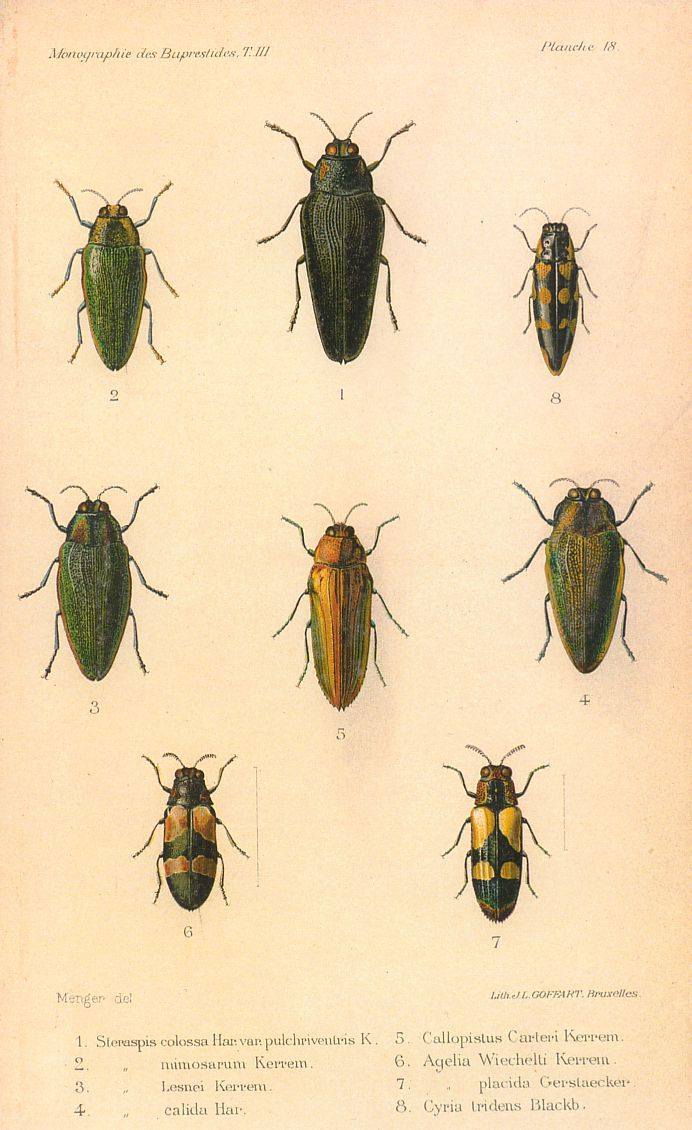
Plate from Charles Kerremans' Monograph on Buprestidae

Hans Pochon (1900–1977) was a Swiss entomologist and an authority on Buprestidae beetles.

From 1931 he worked at the Musee d'histoire naturelle in Fribourg and restructured its entomological collections. As the museum did not have a collection of local Coleoptera, he donated his own collection. During his career he gathered some 16 000 specimens of Buprestidae, many of species new to science.

== Publications ==
- Coleoptera - Buprestidae (Volume 2 of Insecta helvetica) - Hans Pochon (Schweizerische Entomologische Gesellschaft, 1964)
- Buprestidae collection from Catalonia
