= Charles S. Apperson =

American entomologist

- Education: North Carolina State University
- Scientific career
- Fields: Entomology
- Workplaces: Humboldt State University; University of California, Riverside

Charles S. Apperson is an American entomologist recognized for and interested in the biology of vectors, such as mosquitoes and ticks. He was elected to the Entomological Society of America in 2009 for his advancements in host-feeding. As of 2009, Apperson has published 110 refereed research publications Apperson got his bachelor's degree from Humboldt State University and his master's degree and doctorate from the University of California, Riverside
