= Louis Gabriel d'Antessanty =

French entomologist (1834–1922)

Louis Gabriel d’Antessanty (or Abbé G.) (26 October 1834 in Troyes – 6 January 1922 in Troyes) was a French entomologist.

His principal publications are:

- L'étude des Hémiptères. Feuille des Jeunes naturalistes XIII (1881). (English: Hemiptera studies)
- Catalogue des Hémiptères-Hétéroptères de l'Aube Dufour-Bouquot Plaquette. Grand In-8 Broché. (English: Aube's hemiptera-heteroptera census by Dufour-Bouquot and Plaquette) Troyes (1891).
- Liste des Orthoptères observés dans l'Aube. Mémoires de la Société Académique de l’Aube, Tome xxv : 1-9 (1916). (English: List of Aube's orthoptera species)

And on general natural history:

- L'étude de l'histoire naturelle. Lecture faite en séance publique de la Société Académique de l'Aube. (English: Open lecture by the Aube academic society)

The types of the new species of Hemiptera described by d'Antessanty were listed in M. Royer in 1922 in the Bulletin de la Société Entomologique de France.
