= Bryan Patrick Beirne =

Bryan Patrick Beirne MRIA, FRES, FLS, FZS, FESC
- Born: 22 January 1918; Ballygeary, County Wexford
- Died: 28 March 1998 (aged 80); Vancouver, British Columbia
- Occupation: entomologist

Bryan Patrick Beirne (22 January 1918 – 31 March 1998) was an Irish entomologist who emigrated to Canada in 1949. He specialised in pest management.

== Early life and education ==
Bryan Patrick Beirne was born in Ballygeary, County Wexford, on 22 January 1918. His parents were Patrick Beirne, tax inspector with UK Customs and Excise and later the Irish Revenue Commissioners, and Mabel Beirne (née Kelly). His maternal grandfather was the owner of the Tuam Herald, Richard J. Kelly. He became interested in entomology at a young age, and joined the Dublin Naturalists' Field Club in 1934. He was mentored by James Nathaniel Halbert.

A student at Blackrock College in Blackrock, County Dublin, Beirne was uninterested in most subjects and even less interested in sport. Beirne entered Trinity College Dublin in 1936, where he devised his own course of studies in entomology and received his PhD at age 22. He held the prestigious Overseas Scholarship of the Royal Commission for the Exhibition of 1851, before becoming a full-time member of the faculty of Trinity College in 1943, at the age of 25.

Beirne married Elizabeth ('Betty') Curry on 22 April 1948 in Blackrock, Dublin. The couple had two children, Patrick and Anne.

== Career ==
He received an appointment as Senior Entomologist for the Canadian Government in Ottawa in 1949, and in 1955 was appointed director of the research of the Research Institute for Biological Control in Belleville, Ontario.

In 1967, he led seven of his scientific colleagues to Simon Fraser University in Burnaby, British Columbia where they established the Pestology Centre, the first structured professional program leading to the then-novel degree of Master in Pest Management (MPM). At SFU Dr. Beirne also served as Dean of Graduate Studies and emeritus Professor of Pest Management. After his retirement in 1983, he maintained close ties with the university and energetically involved himself in innovative business enterprises in pest control and in research on the histories of pest control in both Canada and Ireland. Beirne was elected a member of the Royal Irish Academy in 1944. He was the recipient of many honours and awards including the gold medal of the Entomological Society of Canada and the Career Achievement Award of the Science Council of British Columbia. He lectured in more than 20 countries, published over 15 books and more than 120 scientific research papers. The insect genus Beirneola was named after him as were a number of insect species. He discovered and named more than 30 previously unknown species.

== Death and legacy ==
He died at his home in Burnaby, British Columbia on 28 March 1998. He has been memorialised at Simon Fraser University with the "B.P. Beirne Prize in Pest Management." He published the genalogy,The Family O'Beirne, in 1997.

== Works ==
- The genitalia of the British Rhopalocera and the larger moths by F.N. Pierce & B.P. Bierne. Publ. F.N. Pierce (1941)
- The Origin and History of British Fauna Methuen (1952)
- British Pyralid and Plume Moths Frederick Warne (1952)
- Pest Management London: Leonard Hill (1966)
- Irish Entomology. Irish Naturalists' Journal Special Issue (1985)
