= François-Robert Fenwick Brown =

French entomologist (1837–1915)

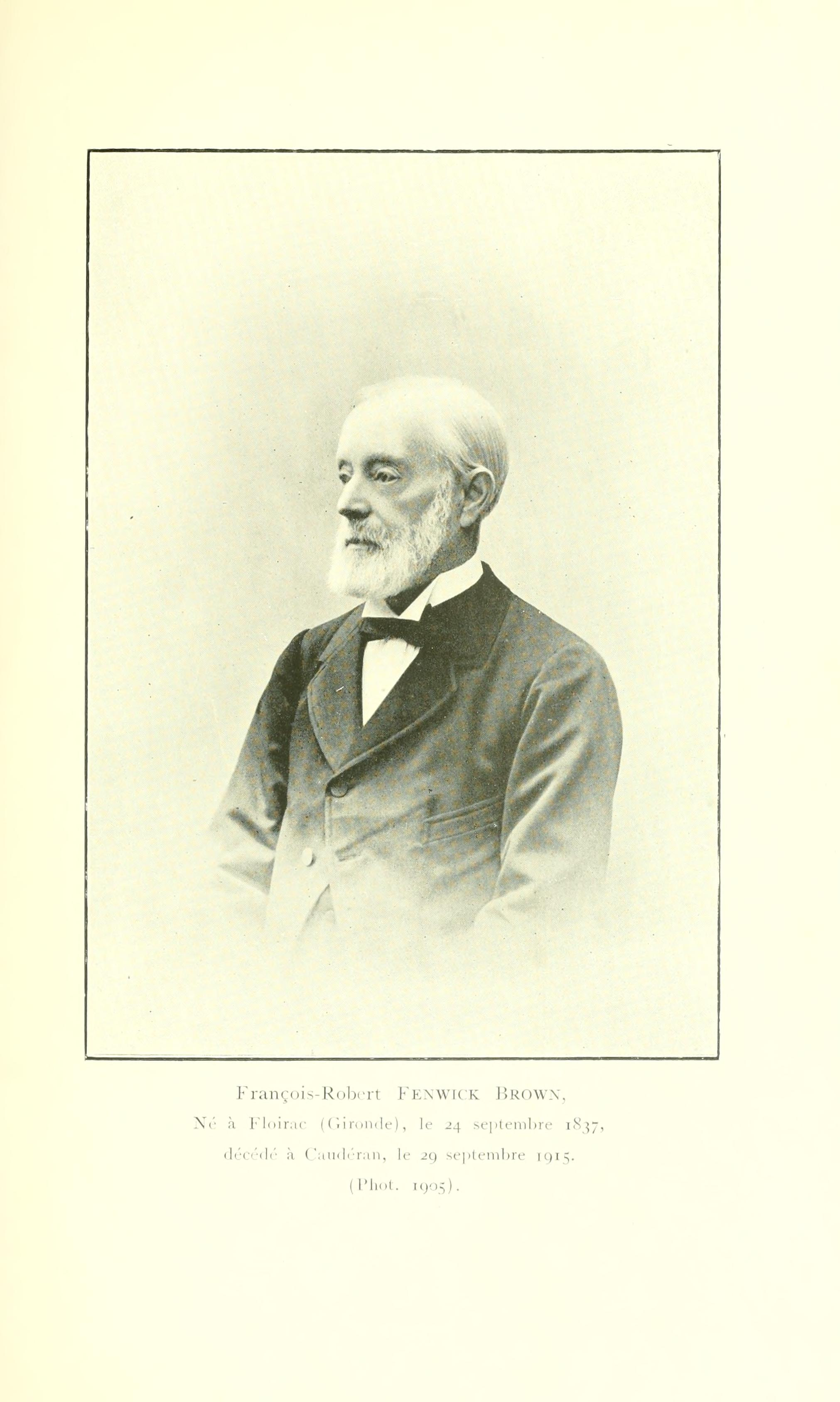
Francois-Robert Fenwick Brown

François-Robert Fenwick Brown (24 September 1837, Bordeaux – 29 September 1915, Caudéran, Gironde) also known as Robert-Francois Brown; Francois Robert Fenwick Brown, was a French entomologist who specialised in Microlepidoptera. He was a Member of the Société entomologique de France.

His collections are held by the Société Linnéenne de Bordeaux (Muséum d'histoire naturelle de Bordeaux).

== Works ==
- Catalogue raisonné des microlépidoptères observés en Gironde jusqu'en 1915 Actes de la Société linnéenne de Bordeaux, 1917
