= Eduard Wilhelm Steinheil =

German entomologist and engineer

- Born: 1830; Munich, Bavaria, Germany
- Died: 11 October 1879 (aged 48–49); Colombia
- Other name: Edoardo Steinheil
- Known for: Discovering new species of insects (entomology)
- Spouse: Johanne née Muller
- Scientific career
- Fields: Entomology
- Author abbrev. (zoology): Steinheil

Eduard Wilhelm Steinheil (1830 – 11 October 1879) (also known as Edoardo Steinheil) was a German entomologist and engineer.

== Life ==
He was born in 1830 at Munich, Bavaria, Germany, to Carl August von Steinheil and Margarethe Amalie née Steinheil.

He worked for C. A. Steinheil & Söhne, an optical-astronomical company founded in 1854 by his father.

He made multiple trips to Colombia to research beetles there. Some aspects of his itinery, activities and specimens are detailed by Bourgeois (1879)

He died on 11 October 1879 in Colombia due to sunstroke.
