= Gao Taiping =

Chinese entomologist and paleontologist

Gao Taiping (Chinese: 高太平; born May 1984) is a Chinese researcher on entomology and paleontology. He was trained at the Inner Mongolia University where in 2005 he received a B.S. in Biology, and at the Capital Normal University where in 2013 he obtained his Ph.D. in genetics. Dr. Gao focuses on the origin and evolution of the insects, especially the ectoparasitim and hymenopteran. Now he works for Capital Normal University.

== Writings ==
In 2012, Gao co-authored Silent Stories: Insect fossil Treasures from Dinosaur Era of the Northeastern China. He has and continues to publish articles in scientific journals all over the world. His articles have been published in journals such as PLoS ONE, Journal of the Kansas Entomological Society, Current Biology, ACTA Geologica Sinica, Annales de la Société Entomologique de France, and Zootaxa.
