= Ernest Menault =

Ernest Menault (1830, Angerville -1903) was a French author and zoologist.

Menault wrote, principally Les Insectes nuisibles à l' Agriculture et à la Viticulture, L’intelligence des animaux (The Intelligence of Animals) and L’amour maternel chez les animaux. A review in the Nature journal for his book The Intelligence of Animals, noted that "we have not been led to form a very high opinion of his physiology or of his general philosophy; but he has compiled a most entertaining volume, crammed with most amusing stories about all kinds of animals, from ants to ourang-outangs."

== Selected publications ==
- Les Insectes nuisibles à l' Agriculture et à la Viticulture (1866)
- The Intelligence of Animals (1872)
