= Karl Anton Epiphanius Matzek =

Prussian entomologist

Karl Anton Epiphanius Matzek (Latinised: Carol. Anton. Epiph. Matzek) (5 February 1810, Sośnicowice (German: Kieferstädtel), Lower Silesia – 28 March 1843) was a Prussian entomologist, who described several species of Nicrophorus (burying beetles). As binomial authority, he is called "Matzek".

Little is known of him. He studied at the University of Breslau, where his inaugural dissertation was accepted by the Faculty of Philosophy in 1839. The name under which he published is a Latinised version of a German name, which may itself be a Germanized version of a Polish birth name (the German name "Matsek" is pronounced in similar fashion to the Polish name "Maczek"). As a result of the border adjustments which followed World War II, both his birthplace and the place where he studied (modern Wrocław) are in present-day Poland.

== Species described ==
He described the following species, all in 1839:

- N. germanicum, junior synonym of N. germanicus
- N. humatorem, junior synonym of N. humator
- N. marginatum, junior synonym of N. marginatus
- N. mediatum, junior synonym of N. carolinus
- N. velutinum, junior synonym of N. tomentosus
- N. vespillonem and N. vespillonis, junior synonyms of N. vespillo
- N. vestigatorem, junior synonym of N. vestigator
