= Jeffery Pettis =

American biologist and entomologist

Jeffery Stuart Pettis
- Born: February 8, 1955 (age 71); United States
- Citizenship: American
- Education: University of Georgia, BSA 1982, MS 1985; Texas A&M, PhD, 1991
- Known for: Honey bee biology, behavior and host-parasite relationships, CCD
- Spouse: Marianne Pettis
- Awards: EAS Student Apicultural Award 1990, Hambleton Award 2004
- Scientific career
- Fields: Entomology
- Workplaces: USDA Beltsville Bee Laboratory, Beltsville, MD
- Thesis: Tracheal Mite, Acarapis Woodi (Rennie) Biology and Ecology in the Honey Bee, Apis Mellifera L. (1991)
- Doctoral advisor: Bill Wilson
- Other academic advisors: Pete Teel

Jeffery Stuart Pettis is an American-born biologist and entomologist known for his extensive research on honeybee behavior. He is currently head of Apimondia. He was the research leader at the United States Department of Agriculture's Beltsville Bee Laboratory (BBL). His research has led to significant breakthroughs in understanding and managing CCD, a primary cause of North American bee population decline. He is also known for discovering with Dennis vanEngelsdorp, then at Pennsylvania State University, the ability of bees to detect pesticides and harmful fungi in collected pollen and subsequently quarantine the harmful substances from the rest of the hive. His research has also studied the synergistic effects of Imidacloprid on bees, an insecticide derived from nicotine which has been shown to contribute to CCD.
