= William Frederick Johnson =

Irish naturalist (1852–1934)

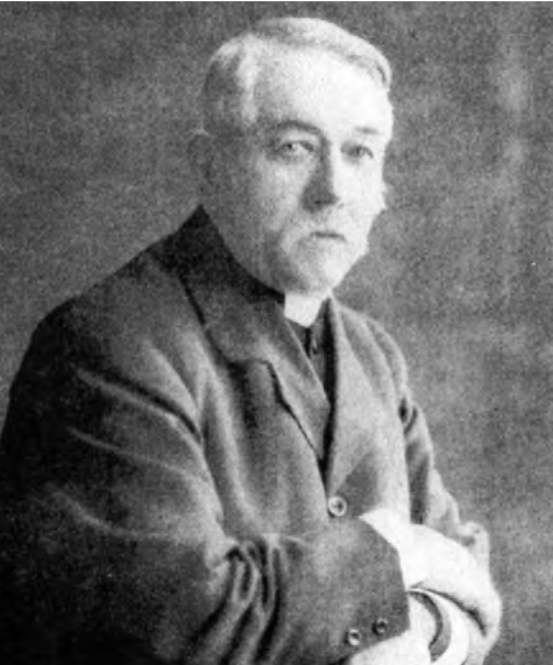
- Born: 20 April 1852; Cochin, India
- Died: 28 March 1934 (aged 81); Rostrevor, County Down
- Awards: Special Life Fellow of the Royal Entomological Society of London

William Frederick Johnson (1852–1934) was an Irish priest and naturalist, primarily interested in entomology. He presided over the Armagh Natural History and Philosophical Society around 1895 and contributed numerous notes to the Irish Naturalist.

== Life and family ==
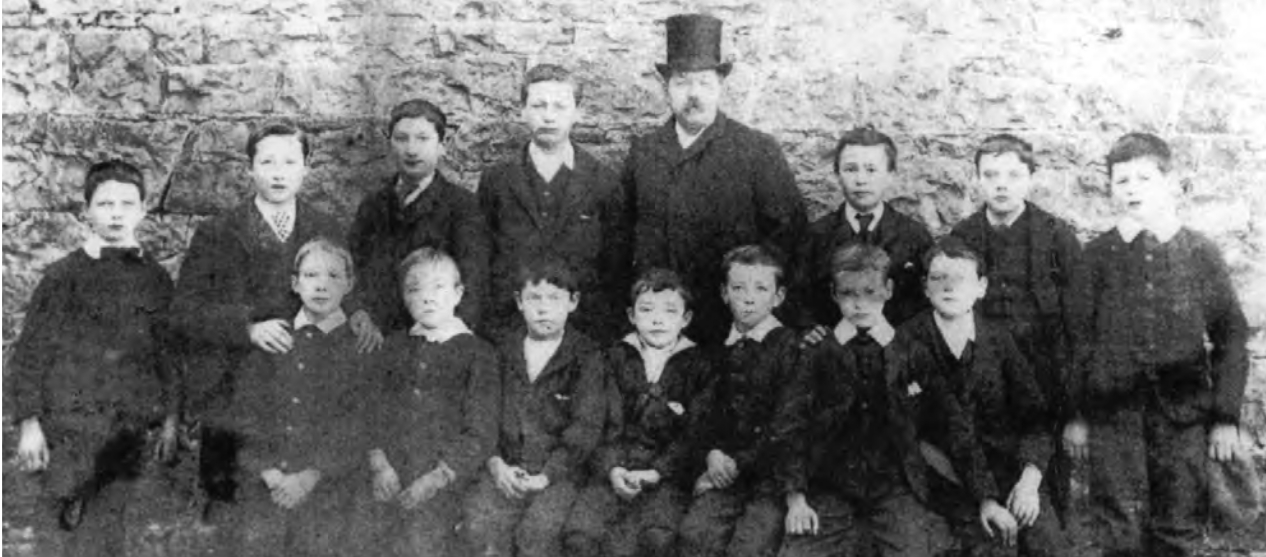
With students of the Cathedral Grammar School, 1894

Johnson was born on 20 April 1852 in Cochin, Travancore, India, where he spent about seven years of his life after which the family returned to England. He was the son of Edward J. Johnson, a member of the Church Missionary Society, and his wife Eliza. He was mostly privately educated, though he attended Weymouth grammar school, Surrey, Arlington House school, Portarlington, and the Royal School, Armagh. He then attended Trinity College Dublin, graduating with a BA in 1876 and an MA in 1880. He was ordained a deacon in 1879, and a priest in 1880. He spent most of his life in County Armagh, first as a teacher in Armagh town in the Royal School, then as Rector in Poyntzpass. He was Vicar Choral at St. Patrick's Cathedral, Armagh (1881-1895). Here he was a colleague of Reeves of the Royal Irish Academy. He also served as headmaster of the Cathedral Grammar School. Later in life he spent time in various parts of County Down and County Louth.

On 20 April 1880, Johnson married Emma Susan Hardy. She died in 1921. He remarried on 5 December 1922, to Wilhemina McDowell. He didn't have any children. He died at Rostrevor on 28 March 1934 and was buried at Acton.

== Entomology ==
From a young age, Johnson was a keen collector of butterflies and moths. While living in Armagh, he began collecting beetles, wasps and bees. He collected across the north of Ireland as well as during holidays to Sligo and Donegal. His early papers were published his records in the Entomologist's Monthly Magazine, and later in the Irish Naturalist. He published over 100 papers each on Lepidoptera, sixty or so on Hymenoptera and smaller numbers on each of ten other insect orders. His best known work is A list of the beetles of Ireland (Coleoptera) a collaboration with James Nathaniel Halbert published in 1902. Johnson took part in the Clare Island Survey, collecting the insects for the survey's reports.

He was elected a Special Life Fellow of the Royal Entomological Society of London. He sought the expertise of others to confirm some of his more dubious identifications. His Ichneumonidae were sent to the Swede Per Abraham Roman, for instance. Richard Strauss once said of himself "I am not a composer of the first rate, but I am a splendid composer of the second". The same may said of William Johnson.

Later in life, Johnson suffered with ill-health, but his wife and niece, Helen Craig, continued to collect on his behalf. He was remembered as a kind mentor to younger naturalists and other keen amateurs.

Johnson's Coleoptera Collection is in the Ulster Museum, Belfast. The Hymenoptera, Lepidoptera and other orders are in the National Museum of Ireland, Dublin. Unfortunately none of his correspondence has survived.

== Works ==
- Johnson, W.F. & Halbert, J.N. (1902). A list of the beetles of Ireland. Proc. R. Ir. Acad.6(3): 535–827.
- Johnson, W.F. & Halbert, J.N. (1912). Clare Island Survey. 28. Terrestrial Coleoptera. Proc. R. Ir. Acad. 31: 1–24
