= Ernest August Hellmuth von Kiesenwetter =

German entomologist

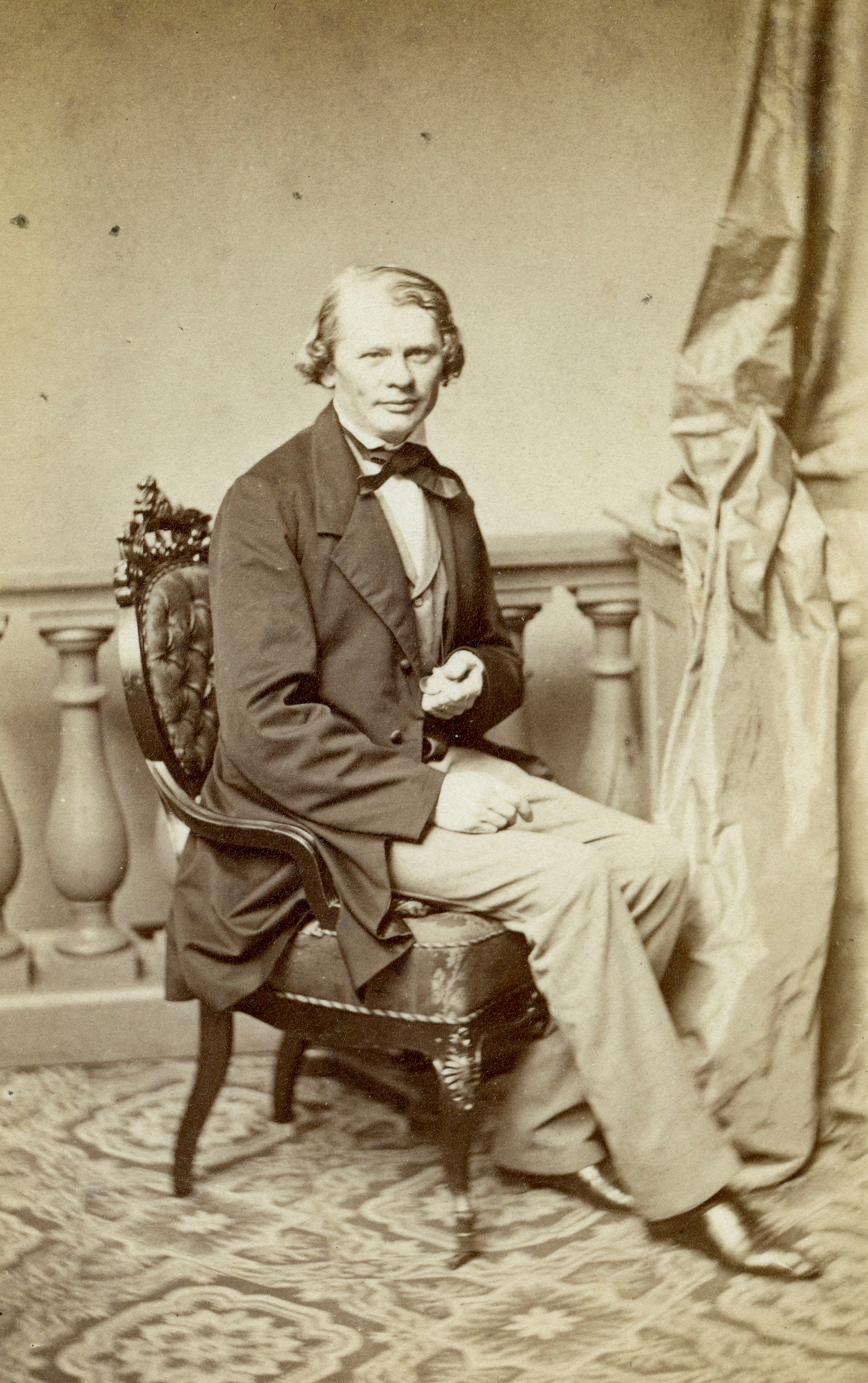

Ernst August Hellmuth von Kiesenwetter (5 November 1820 Dresden – 18 March 1880 in Dresden) was a German entomologist who specialised in beetles.

Kiesenwetter's Coleoptera collection is in the Museum of Natural History, Munich and his Hymenoptera and Heteroptera are in Staatliches Museum für Tierkunde Dresden.

== Works ==
Kiesenwetter's works include:

- 1857 Naturgeschichte der Insecten Deutschlands, Coleoptera 4(1):1-176.
- 1857 Bemerkungen über Lacordaires Buprestiden-System. Berliner Entomologische Zeitschrift1:169-171.
- 1858. Beiträge zur Käferfauna Griechenlands. Stück 4 (Parnidae, Heteroceridae, Lamellicornia, Buprestidae). Berliner Entomologische Zeitschrift 2:231-249.
- 1859. Anthaxia plicata, p. 58. In: H. Schaum, Beiträge zur europäischen Käfer. Berliner Entomologische Zeitschrift 3:42-59.
- 1859. Synonymische Bemerkungen. Berliner Entomologische Zeitschrift 3:91-92.
- 1870 en la Península Ibérica (Coleoptera, Hydrochidae). Boln Asoc. esp. Ent. 22(1/2): 145–149. 1998
- 1874. Die malocodermen Japan's nach dem Ergebnisse der Sammlungen des Herrn. G. Lewis während der Jahre 1869–1871. Berliner Entomol. Zeitschrift, 18: 241–288
- 1874. Synonymische Bemerkungen. Berliner Entomologische Zeitschrift 18:440-441.
- 1877 with T. Kirsch Die Käferfauna der Aukland-Inseln, nach Herm. Krone's Sammlungen beschrieben. Deutsche Entomologische Zeitschrift 21: 153–174.
- 1879. Neue Amur-Käfer. Deutsche Entomologische Zeitschrift 23(1):145-146.
- 1879. Coleoptera Japoniae collecta a Domino Lewis et aliis. Deut. Entomol. Z. 23: 305–320.
- 1880 with T. Kirsch. Neue Anthaxia-Arten. Entomologische Monatsblätter 19:129-133.
