= Per Abraham Roman =

Swedish entomologist (1872–1943)

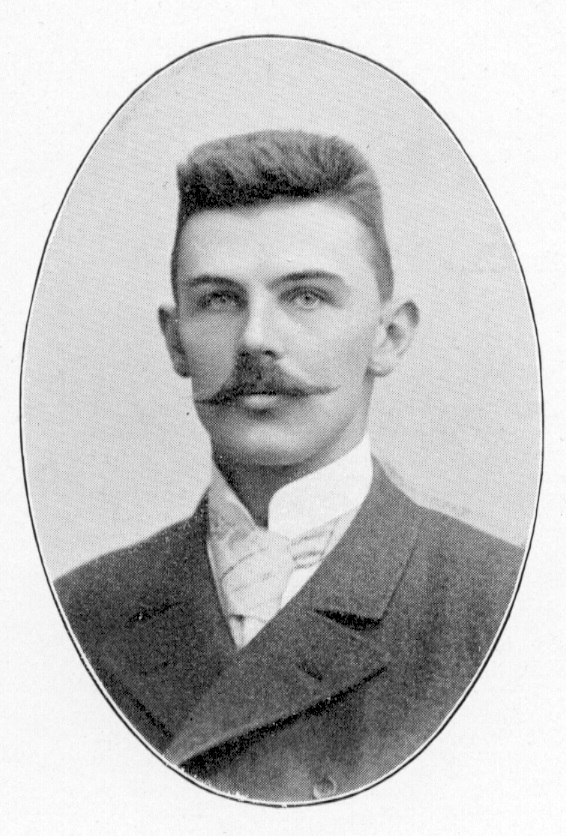
- Born: 16 November 1872; Tjos, Västergötland
- Died: 23 December 1943 (aged 71); Örebro, Sweden

Abraham Roman also Per Abraham Roman (1872–1943) was a Swedish entomologist. He specialised in Ichneumonidae (the ichneumonid wasps), working on worldwide expedition material in the Stockholm Natural History Museum. His collection is in that institution. Roman made two expeditions to South America. During his 36-year career at the museum, Roman systematically expanded and reorganized the museum's ichneumonid collection, increasing it from about 25,000 to over 120,000 identified specimens. Roman pioneered the use of genital morphology for distinguishing similar-looking Pimplinae species and introduced standardized terminology for describing structural patterns on the rear segment of wasp bodies, a system that became widely adopted in scientific identification guides.

== Life and career ==
Per Abraham Roman was born at Tjos, Västergötland, on 16 November 1872 and trained as a primary-school teacher before reading zoology at Uppsala University under Tycho Tullberg. In 1907 he was appointed amanuensis in charge of Hymenoptera at the Swedish Museum of Natural History (NRM), a post he retained until his death in Örebro on 23 December 1943. Over 36 years he curated and systematically re-arranged the museum's Ichneumonidae, raising the number of identified specimens from about 25,000 to more than 120,000.

== Expeditions and collecting ==
Roman twice led privately funded expeditions to Brazil: first to the Amazon basin and Pará (1914–1915) and again to Bahia and the Lower Amazon (1923–1924). Together the journeys yielded about 18,000 ichneumonids (the ichneumonid wasps), 4,000 of which—representing 185 new species—were described by him in a nine-part series published 1924–1932 in Arkiv för Zoologi. He subsequently joined the Swedish Kamchatka Expedition (1920–1922) and reported 69 new taxa from eastern Siberia.

== Taxonomic contributions ==
Roman named roughly 450 new species and 14 new genera of Ichneumonidae; his revision of Thunberg's type material (1912) is still the authority for many Palearctic taxa. He was an early advocate of genital-morphology characters for separating cryptic Pimplinae species and introduced the term "propodeal carination pattern" that later became standard in keys.

== Professional service and legacy ==
Elected to the Entomological Society of Stockholm in 1905, he served as its president (1928–1932) and edited Entomologisk Tidskrift for six volumes. He donated duplicates from his South-American material to museums in Berlin, London and Washington, facilitating global comparative work. Roman's main collection—including types—is housed at the NRM and fully digitised as part of the GBIF-Sweden node (project 2020–2023).

== Selected publications ==
- Beiträge zur den schwedischen Ichneumones pentagoni journal? (1919)
- Die Ichneumonidentypen C. P. Thunbergs. Zoologiska Bidrag fran Uppsala, 1: 229-293 (1912)
- Ichneumoniden aus den Färöern. Mit 6 Figuren Im Texte, Uppsala 1916 (16 Seiten, Arkiv för Zoologi 10: 17) (1916)
- Beiträge zur den schwedischen Ichneumones pentagoni (1919)
- Entomologische Ergebnisse der schwedischen Kamtschatka-Expedition 1920-1922. 33. Ichneumonidae, Subfamilien Pimplinae und Tryphoninae. Arkiv für Zoologi, 23A (6): 1-32. (193-)
