= James Nathaniel Halbert =

Irish entomologist

James Nathaniel Halbert MRIA
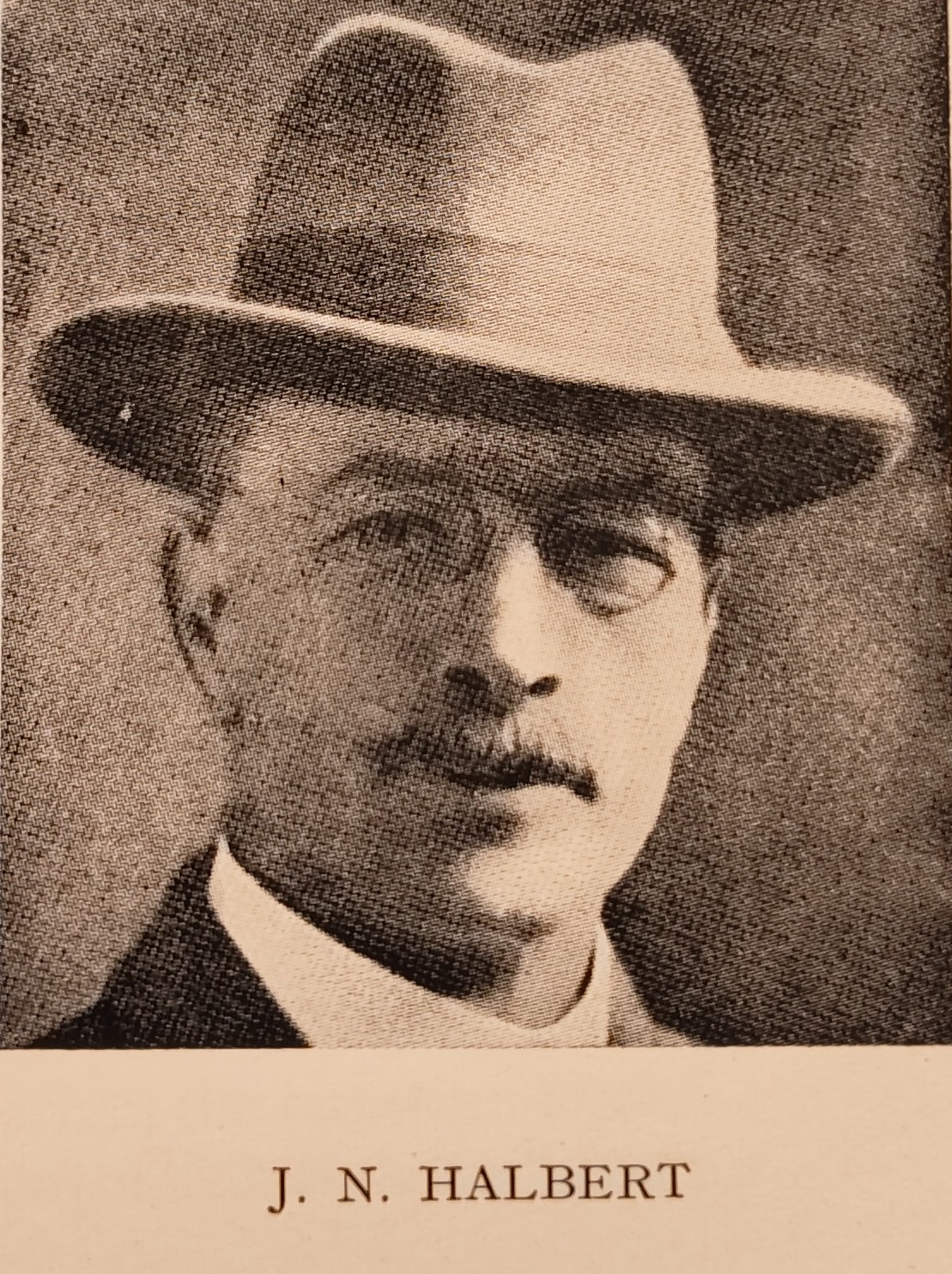
- Born: 30 August 1872; Rathgar, Dublin, Ireland
- Died: 7 May 1948 (aged 75); Dalkey, Dublin
- Occupation: entomologist

James Nathaniel Halbert was an Irish entomologist known for his work on Coleoptera and water mites.

== Life ==
James Nathaniel Halbert was born 30 August 1872 in Rathgar, Dublin. His father was John A. Halbert, an antiques dealer, and had five siblings. He was privately educated and attended a Christian Brothers' School. His interest in Lepidoptera began in school, influenced by Robert Francis Scharff, a friend of the family.

== Career ==
In 1892, Halbert began work at the Science and Art Museum, in Dublin (now the National Museum of Ireland). He was appointed Technical Assistant in 1904 and then Assistant Naturalist, in place of George Herbert Carpenter, a few months later.

His first publications were on Coleoptera and appeared in the Irish Naturalist starting in 1892. He also worked with other insects, mainly Neuroptera and Hemiptera. He also worked with fresh water mites, described more than forty insect species and subspecies from Ireland, and was the author of several new genera. Over his lifetime, he published almost 80 papers and notes. Between 1892 and 1904, the majority of his entomological work was done at the weekends and evenings. He was a member of the Irish Field Club Union, and took part in their excursions to collect further. He took part in the Lambay Island Survey from 1905 and Clare Island Survey from 1909, reporting on Coleoptera, Neuroptera, Hemiptera, and Acarinida. He was elected a member of the Royal Irish Academy in 1908, and was elected to the Flora and Fauna Committee in 1925.

Halbert was a member of the Dublin Naturalists' Field Club from 1895 to 1916, serving as a committee member in 1902, and often exhibited at their meetings. He was also a member of the Dublin Microscopical Club.

== Death and legacy ==
He continued to study Irish mites after his retirement in 1923, until his death. Halbert died 7 May 1948 in Dalkey, Dublin, Ireland. He was survived by four sisters. His friend and fellow entomologist, Bryan Patrick Beirne, wrote his obituary stating "Halbert's chief personal characteristics were his unfailing good humour and cheerfulness. He was always ready to assist others and [I am]...only one of many who owe much to his continued guidance and encouragement. Halbert had many interests apart from entomology. He was an expert ornithologist, musician and chess-player. He had an extensive knowledge of literature and art. He amassed large collections of stamps and post-marks."

Much of his slide specimens, manuscript and other material is held in the National Museum of Ireland. The material he collected after his retirement was presented by his sisters to the museum after his death.

== Selected works ==
- With William Frederick Johnson, A list of the beetles of Ireland. Proceedings of the Royal Irish Academy 6B: 535-827 (1902).
- With James John Francis Xavier King, A list of the Neuroptera of Ireland. Proceedings of the Royal Irish Academy 28B: 29-112 (1910).
- A list of the Irish Hemiptera (Heteroptera and Cicadina). Proceedings of the Royal Irish Academy 42B: 211-318 (1935).
- List of Irish fresh-water mites (Hydracarina) Proceedings of the Royal Irish Academy 50, B, 4:39-103 (1944)
