= Thomas Desvignes =

English entomologist

Thomas Desvignes (1812 – 11 May 1868) was an English entomologist who specialised in Hymenoptera. He wrote (1856) Catalogue of British Ichneumonidae in the collection of the British Museum (London) and many scientific papers describing new species. Desvignes was a member of the Entomological Society of London from 1849. His collection of Ichneumonidae is in the Natural History Museum, London.
