= List of coleopterists =

Notable students of coleopterology (beetles) include the following.

== Coleopterists from Australia ==
- George Francis Bornemissza (born Hungary)
- John Francis Lawrence (born U.S.A)

== Coleopterists from Austria ==
- Stephan von Breuning
- Karl Wilhelm von Dalla Torre
- Caspar Erasmus Duftschmid
- Johann Angelo Ferrari
- Ludwig Ganglbauer
- Karl Borromaeus Maria Josef Heller
- Eduard Knirsch
- Johann Nepomuk von Laicharting
- Johann Carl Megerle von Mühlfeld
- Ludwig Redtenbacher
- Pater Gabriel Strobl

== Coleopterists from Belgium ==
- Ernest Candèze
- Félicien Chapuis
- Charles Kerremans
- Jean Théodore Lacordaire
- Auguste Lameere

== Coleopterists from Brazil ==
- Ângelo Moreira da Costa Lima

== Coleopterists from Canada ==
- George Eugene Ball (born U.S.A)
- Aleš Smetana (also Czechoslovakia)

== Coleopterists from Croatia ==
- Guido Nonveiller

== Coleopterists from Czechoslovakia ==
- Anton Franz Nonfried
- Jan Obenberger
- Jan Daniel Preysler

== Coleopterists from Denmark ==
- Johan Christian Fabricius
- Otto Friedrich Müller

== Coleopterists from England (United Kingdom) ==
- Anthony A. Allen
- Herbert Edward Andrewes
- Gilbert John Arrow
- Joseph Sugar Baly
- Henry Walter Bates
- Thomas Blackburn (also Hawaii and Australia)
- George Charles Champion
- James Cook Endeavour captain
- George Crabbe
- George Robert Crotch (also U.S.A.)
- Roy Crowson
- John Curtis
- Charles Darwin
- Horace Donisthorpe
- William Weekes Fowler
- Alexander Fry
- Eleanor Glanville
- Frederick DuCane Godman
- Henry Stephen Gorham
- Edward Wesley Janson
- Oliver Erichson Janson
- Norman H. Joy
- William Elford Leach
- John Henry Leech
- George Lewis
- Thomas Marsham
- Philip Brookes Mason
- Andrew Murray
- Frederic John Sidney Parry
- David Sharp
- William Edward Shuckard
- James Francis Stephens
- Alfred Russel Wallace
- James John Walker
- Thomas Vernon Wollaston

== Coleopterists from Estonia ==
- Johann Friedrich von Eschscholtz

== Coleopterists from Finland ==
- Carl Gustaf von Mannerheim

== Coleopterists from France ==
- César Marie Félix Ancey
- Félix Jean Marie Louis Ancey
- Charles Nicholas Aubé
- Alfred Balachowsky
- Eugène Barthe
- Ernest Marie Louis Bedel
- Louis Beguin-Billecocq
- Nicolas Adolphe Bellevoye
- Eugène Benderitter
- Henri Bertrand
- Anatole Auguste Boieldieu
- Jules Bourgeois
- Charles N. F. Brisout
- Jean Baptiste Lucien Buquet
- Louis Companyo
- François-Louis Laporte, comte de Castelnau
- Jean-Charles Chenu
- Louis Alexandre Auguste Chevrolat
- Pierre François Marie Auguste Dejean
- Jules Desbrochers des Loges
- Achille Deyrolle
- Robert Didier
- Jean-Louis Alléon-Dulac
- André Marie Constant Duméril
- Charles Adolphe Albert Fauvel
- François Josephe Fettig
- Antoine Casimir Marguerite Eugène Foudras
- Étienne Louis Geoffroy
- Maurice Jean Auguste Girard
- Joseph-Étienne Giraud
- Auguste Jean François Grenier
- Émile Joseph Isidore Gobert
- Félix Guignot
- Alphonse Hustache
- Pierre Nicolas Camille Jacquelin du Val
- Charles Georges Javet
- Jean Théodore Lacordaire
- Pierre André Latreille
- Édouard Lefèvre
- Charles Eugène Leprieur
- Sylvain Auguste de Marseul
- Édouard Ménétries (also Russia)
- Pierre-Aimé Millet
- Étienne Mulsant
- René Oberthür
- Guillaume-Antoine Olivier
- Louis Pandellé
- Auguste Simon Paris
- Benoit-Philibert Perroud
- Maurice Pic
- Louis Jérôme Reiche
- Maurice Auguste Régimbart
- Claudius Rey
- Auguste Sallé
- Ludwig Wilhelm Schaufuss
- Antoine Joseph Jean Solier
- James Thomson (entomologist) (born U.S.A)

== Coleopterists from Germany ==
- Michael Bach
- Max Bernhauer
- Philipp Bertkau
- Hans Bischoff
- Oskar Boettger
- Johann von Böber
- Johann Friedrich von Brandt
- Christian Casimir Brittinger
- Heinrich Christian Burckhardt
- Carl Gustav Calwer
- Friedrich Wilhelm Erdmann Clasen
- George Dieck
- Rudolph Dittrich
- Carl August Dohrn
- Wilhelm Ferdinand Erichson
- Franz Faldermann also Russia
- Johannes Faust
- Arnold Förster
- Ernst Friedrich Germar
- Johann Friedrich Wilhelm Herbst
- Carl Heinrich Georg(es) von Heyden
- Theodor Hildebrandt
- Adolf Horion
- Walther Hermann Richard Horn
- Johann Karl Wilhelm Illiger
- Carl Gustav Jablonsky
- Martin Jacoby
- Gustav Jäger
- Ernest August Hellmuth von Kiesenwetter
- Theodor Franz Wilhelm Kirsch
- Johann Christoph Friedrich Klug
- Hermann Julius Kolbe
- Johann Gottlieb Kugelann
- Gustav Kunze
- Johann Christian Friedrich Märkel
- Franz Anton Menge
- Wilhelm Mink
- Wilhelm Möllenkamp
- Julius Moser
- John Nietner
- Georg Hermann Alexander Ochs
- Georg Wolfgang Franz Panzer
- Maximilian Perty
- Edmund Reitter
- Karl Rost
- Hermann Rudolph Schaum
- Sigmund Schenkling
- Friedrich Julius Schilsky
- Georg Karl Maria Seidlitz
- Jacob Sturm
- Christian Wilhelm Ludwig Eduard Suffrian

== Coleopterists from Hungary ==
- Elemér Bokor
- Karel Brančik
- Ernő Csíki
- Friedrich F. Tippmann

== Coleopterists from Ireland ==
- James Nathaniel Halbert
- Alexander Henry Haliday
- William Frederick Johnson
- Eugene O'Mahoney
- James Tardy

== Coleopterists from Italy ==
- Raniero Alliata di Pietratagliata
- Pietro Bargagli
- Carlo Bassi
- Flaminio Baudi di Selve
- Giuseppe Bertoloni
- Franco Andrea Bonelli
- Carlo Emery
- Ferdinando Arborio Gattinara di Breme
- Raffaello Gestro
- Bernardino Halbherr
- Paolo Luigioni
- Francisco Minà Palumbo
- Carlo Passerini
- Leonello Picco
- Odorado Pirazzoli
- Giovanni Antonio Scopoli

== Coleopterists from Japan ==
- Tsunamitsu Adachi

== Coleopterists from the Netherlands ==
- Coenraad Ritsema
- Johann Eusebius Voet

== Coleopterists from Norway ==
- Embrik Strand

== Coleopterists from Russia ==
- Ernst von Ballion
- Maximilien Chaudoir
- Tikhon Sergeyevich Chicherin (= Tschitscherine)
- Georgiy Georgiyevich Jacobson
- Nikita Rafailovich Kokuyev (= Kukujev, Kokujev)
- Oleg Leonidovich Kryzhanovsky
- Édouard Ménétries (also France)
- Victor Ivanovich Motschulsky
- Andrey Semyonov-Tyan-Shansky (= Semenov, Semenov-Tian-Shanskij, Semenov-Tian-Shanskii)
- Alexander Ivanovich Yakovlev (= Jakowlew, Jakowleff, Jakovlev)
- Vasily Evgrafovich Yakovlev (= Jakowlew, Jakowlev, Jakowleff= B.E )

== Coleopterists from Spain ==
- José María Hugo de la Fuente Morales
- Ignacio Bolívar
- Fermín Martín Piera
- Cándido Bolívar Pieltain

== Coleopterists from Sweden ==
- Per Olof Christopher Aurivillius
- Carl Henrik Boheman
- Charles De Geer
- Leonard Gyllenhaal
- Carl Linnaeus
- Gustaf von Paykull
- Carl Johan Schönherr
- Carl Peter Thunberg
- Carl Gustaf Thomson

== Coleopterists from Switzerland ==
- Louis Agassiz (also USA)
- Andreas Bischoff-Ehinger
- Oswald Heer
- Ivan Löbl (also Czechoslovakia)
- George Meyer-Darcis
- Johann Rudolph Schellenberg
- Henri Tournier

== Coleopterists from the United States of America ==
- Louis Agassiz (also Switzerland)
- Ross H. Arnett, Jr.
- Heath Blackmon
- Willis Blatchley
- George Robert Crotch
- Henry Clinton Fall
- William Trowbridge Merrifield Forbes
- George Henry Horn
- Henry Guernsey Hubbard
- John Lawrence LeConte
- Alfred Francis Newton
- Edith Marion Patch
- Eugene Amandus Schwarz
- Herbert Huntingdon Smith
- Michael C. Thomas
- Rose Ella Warner

== To be categorised ==
- Herbert Edward Cox
- Thomas H.M. Gorden

== See also ==
- Timeline of entomology
- Entomology
