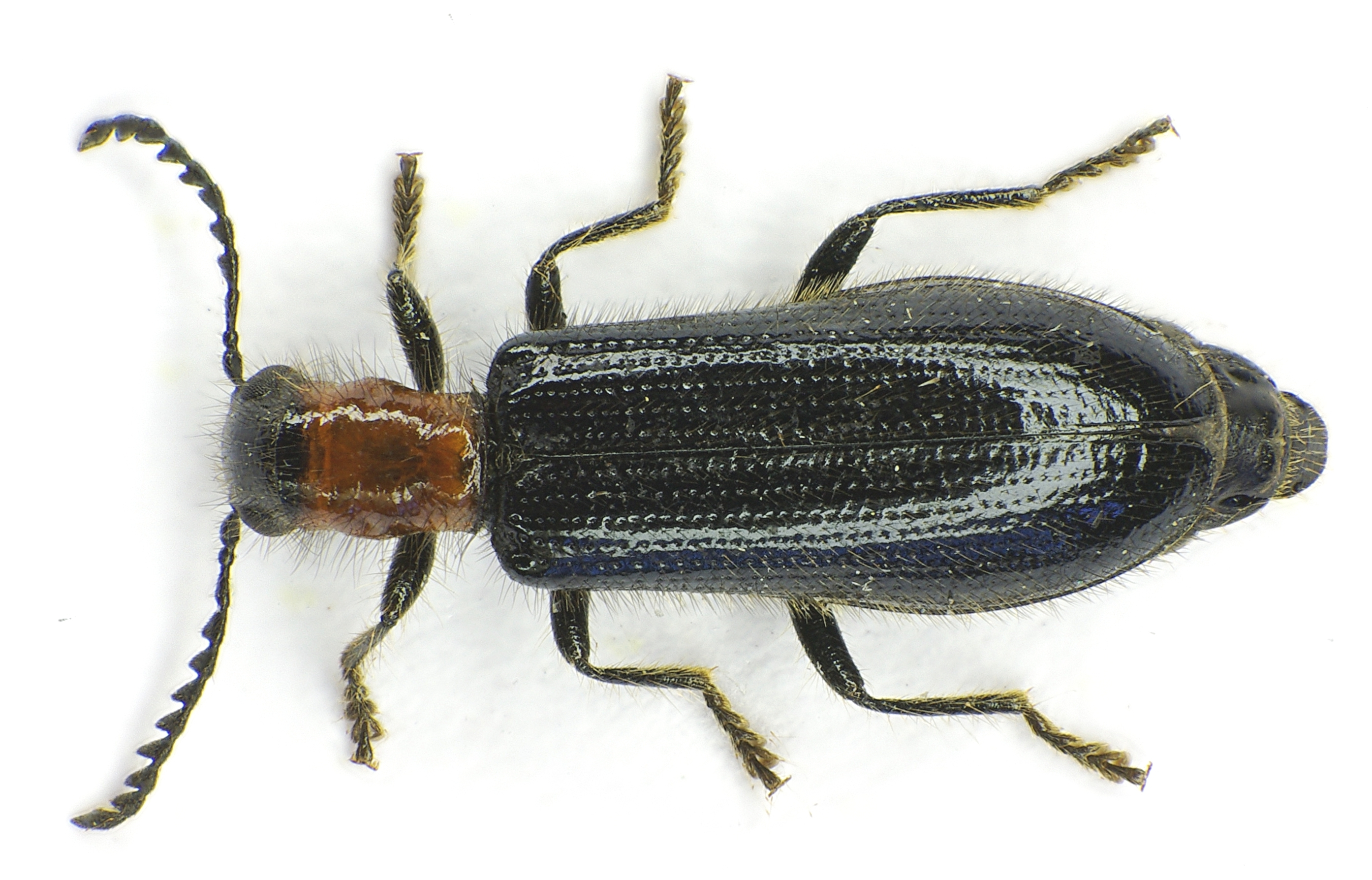
- Tillus elongatus 7-10 mm

Scientific classification
- Kingdom: Animalia
- Phylum: Arthropoda
- Clade: Pancrustacea
- Class: Insecta
- Order: Coleoptera
- Suborder: Polyphaga
- Infraorder: Cucujiformia
- Family: Cleridae
- Genus: Tillus
- Species: T. elongatus

Binomial name
- Tillus elongatus (Linnaeus, 1758)

= Tillus elongatus =

Species of beetle

Tillus elongatus is a species of beetle in the family Cleridae. It is found in the Palearctic. The “Holz” in the German common name Holzbuntkäfer indicates that these checkered beetles are found in wood. Although Tillus elongatus can reach up to a size of 1 cm long, the beetle is rarely seen by humans, as it primarily resides hidden in the wood of trees. The colouration of the males differs from that of the females.

== Name and classification ==
The earliest known systematic record of the species is by Carolus Linnaeus in 1758. It is listed in the 10th edition of his Systema naturae under genus Chrysomela, number 78, as Chrysomela elongata atra, thorace rubro subvilloso (Lat."elongated black Chrysomela, red chest moderately hairy"). This explains the epithet elongata. After Fabricius established the genus Lagria, Olivier, in 1790, placed the species in the genus Tillus. Five species of this genus have been identified in Europe. Olivier reasoned solely based on anatomical features that the beetle could not belong to either the leaf beetles (Chrysomelidae) or to Lagriinae.

== Anatomy ==
Tillus elongatus reaches lengths of 7 to 10 mm. The body of the male is especially long and cylindrical. In contrast to most checkered beetles, Tillus elongatus is plainly coloured. The male is uniformly black. The female, on the other hand, has a reddish brown pronotum and bluish black elytra. In rare cases, the base of the pronotum of the male is also completely or partially red. The elytra of the female are less parallel than those of the male. On the top side of both sexes are long, slanted hairs. The hairs are coarse and black. The pronotum and elytra may have transverse white spots.

The head is slightly wider than the neck. The mouthparts point downwards. The mandible is bidentate at the tip. The three-segmented labial palpi are more powerful than the maxillary palpi. The end segment of the first maxilla broadens into an axe or shovel shape, while the end segment of the labium gradually elongates to a point. The round eyes are near the pronotum. The third segment and onward of the powerful antennae are serrated on the inner side, while the second segment is small and round.

The pronotum is distinctly narrower than the elytra. It is cylindrical, round and not bordered on the side.

The elytra might not cover the last abdominal segment. The elytra are dotted nearly all the way to the tip with simple punctures.

The coxae of the front legs are close to each other and are protruding cones. The cavities of the front coxae are open in the back but closed inside. To somewhat accommodate the femurs, the back coxae are not bulged. They are on the same level as the first abdominal sternite. The abdomen has 6 visible abdominal plates. The tarsi are all distinctly five-segmented. The first tarsomere extends into a sole-like structure. All of the tarsomeres except for the fifth are more or less formed like little pouches that partially enclose the base of the proceeding tarsomere. The claws bear large teeth that make them appear split.

== Living habits ==
The heat-loving species is found in old deciduous and mixed forests, as well as in parks. They are usually found in forest edges or in clearcuts on sun-exposed trunks of hardwoods with insect infestation. They are also found in flowering bushes and on flowering lime trees.

The females have a well-formed ovipositor, which they use to lay eggs in wood cracks or in the emergence holes of other insects living in the wood. The oblong larvae hunt larvae of other insects living in the wood, especially the larvae of Ptinidae. With the claws and two chitin hooks at the end of the body, the Tillus elongata larva can also work its way into larval tunnels blocked with debris from boring insects. Often, bore debris is pushed out of the passages. The larva can also bite its way into neighbouring tunnels with its mouthparts if the dividing walls are thin. At night, the larva can leave the tunnel system and crawl into a distant emergence hole on the surface of the wood and thus occupy new passages. Before pupation, the larva widens a dead end passage into a cradle for the pupa. The adults can be found in May and June. More likely to be seen are females, at night, on old deciduous trees.

== Distribution ==
The species is widespread in Western Europe. However, some of the countries do not have occurrence data. The occurrence of Tillus elongata in Eastern Europe is uncertain.

== Literature ==
- Heinz Freude, Karl Wilhelm Harde, Gustav Adolf Lohse: Die Käfer Mitteleuropas. Band 6: Diversicornia. Spektrum, Heidelberg 1979, ISBN 3-87263-027-X.
- Gustav Jäger (Herausgeber): C. G. Calwer's Käferbuch. K. Thienemanns, Stuttgart 1876, 3. Auflage
- Klaus Koch: Die Käfer Mitteleuropas Ökologie. 1. Auflage. Band 2. Goecke & Evers, Krefeld 1989, ISBN 3-87263-040-7.
- Lyngnes, R. 1959: Iakttakelser over "Tillus elongatus'" in Norsk Entomologisk Tidsskrift 1959 Bd. 11: 1–6, Oslo
