= Knirsch =

Kníř/Knirsch is a surname of Czech origin. The Czech "Kníř" was transposed to German as "Knirsch" or "Knirsh". The etymology can be traced to the Czech word "chmýří" (English translation: "fluff") being explained as a person with fine hair.

People with this surname include:

- Eduard Knirsch (1869–1955), Austrian doctor and entomologist
- Hans Knirsch (1877–1933), Moravian German activist
