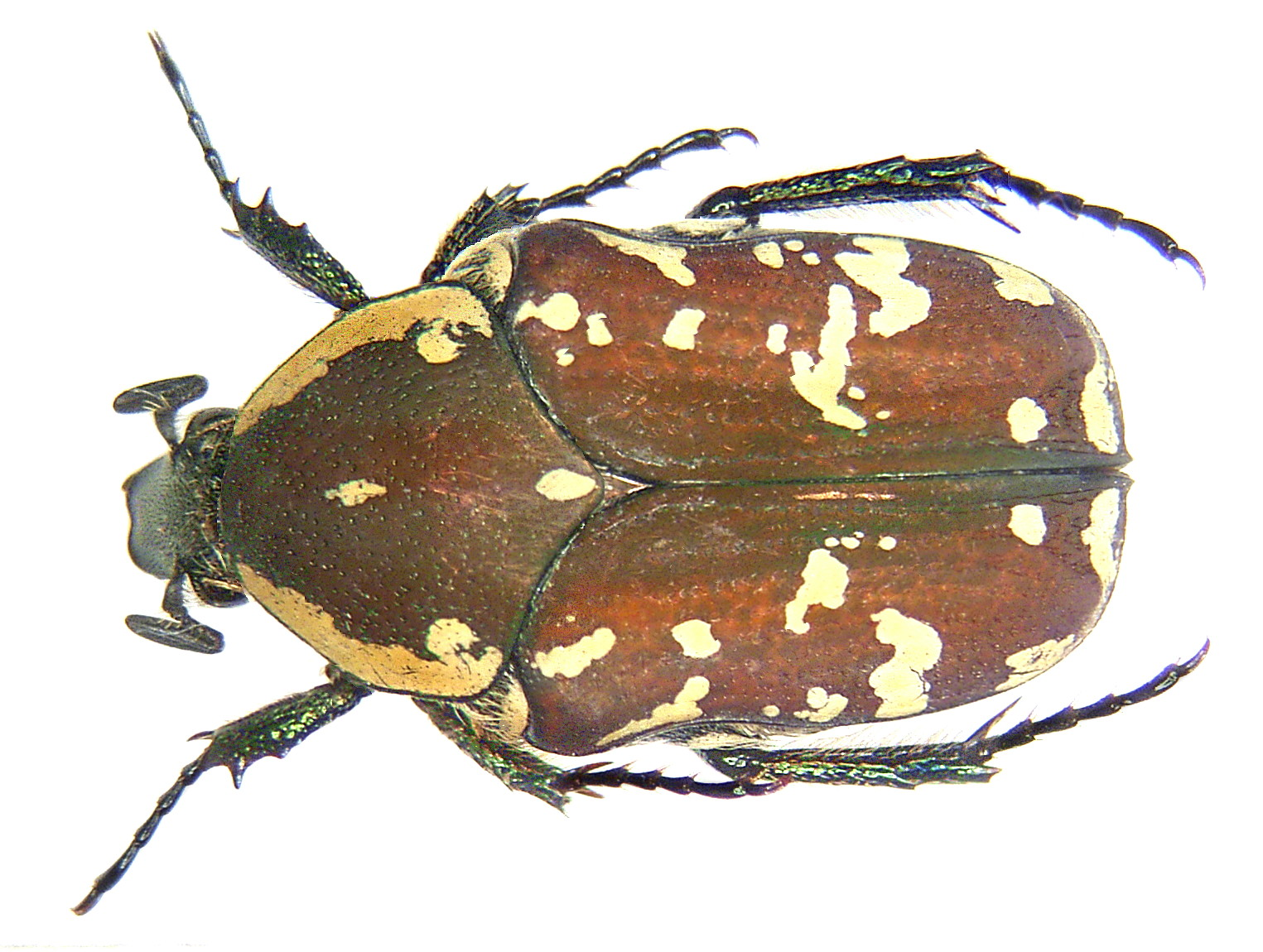
- Clinteria confinis

Scientific classification
- Kingdom: Animalia
- Phylum: Arthropoda
- Class: Insecta
- Order: Coleoptera
- Suborder: Polyphaga
- Infraorder: Scarabaeiformia
- Family: Scarabaeidae
- Tribe: Gymnetini
- Genus: Clinteria; Burmeister, 1842

Species
- See text

= Clinteria =

Genus of beetles

Clinteria is a genus of scarab beetles in the subfamily Cetoniinae found in Asia. The genus is characterized by the scutellum fused with the pronotum.

== Species ==
Clinteria alboguttata Moser, 1905
Clinteria alexisi Antoine, 2001
Clinteria arunachala Chatterjee & Saha, 1981
Clinteria atra (Wiedemann, 1823)
Clinteria baliensis Krajcik & Jakl, 2007
Clinteria belli Janson, 1901
Clinteria buffeventi Bourgoin, 1916
Clinteria caliginosa Janson, 1889
Clinteria ceylonensis Krajcik, 2009
Clinteria chloronota Blanchard, 1850
Clinteria cinctipennis (Gory & Percheron, 1833)
Clinteria coerulea (Herbst, 1783)
Clinteria confinis (Hope, 1831)
Clinteria dimorpha Arrow, 1916
Clinteria ducalis White, 1856
Clinteria flavonotata (Gory & Percheron, 1833)
Clinteria flora Wallace, 1867
Clinteria fraterna Miksic, 1977
Clinteria freyneyi Pavicevic, 1987
Clinteria fujiokai Jakl, 2007
Clinteria hearseiana Westwood, 1849
Clinteria hoffmeisteri White, 1847
Clinteria imperialis (Paykull, 1817)
Clinteria jansoni Schoch, 1898
Clinteria jirouxi Legrand, 2005
Clinteria kaorusakaii Jakl & Krajcik, 2006
Clinteria keiseri Schein, 1956
Clinteria klugi (Hope, 1831)
Clinteria krajciki Jakl, 2007
Clinteria laotica Krajcik & Jakl, 2007
Clinteria liewi Pavicevic, 1987
Clinteria magna Krajcik & Jakl, 2007
Clinteria malayensis Wallace, 1867
Clinteria moae Jakl, 2007
Clinteria moerens (Gory & Percheron, 1833)
Clinteria moultoni Moser, 1911
Clinteria nepalensis Krajcik, 2009
Clinteria nigra Kraatz, 1899
Clinteria pantherina Parry, 1848
Clinteria sakaii Antoine, 2000
Clinteria setulosa Miksic, 1977
Clinteria sexpustulata (Gory & Percheron, 1833)
Clinteria spilota (Hope, 1831)
Clinteria spuria Burmeister, 1847
Clinteria sternalis Moser, 1911
Clinteria surenderi Legrand, 2005
Clinteria tetraspilota (Hope, 1833)
Clinteria tosevski Pavicevic, 1984
Clinteria viridiaurata Jakl, 2007
Clinteria viridissima Mohnike, 1871
Clinteria vittigera Schoch, 1897
Clinteria wongi Pavicevic, 1987
