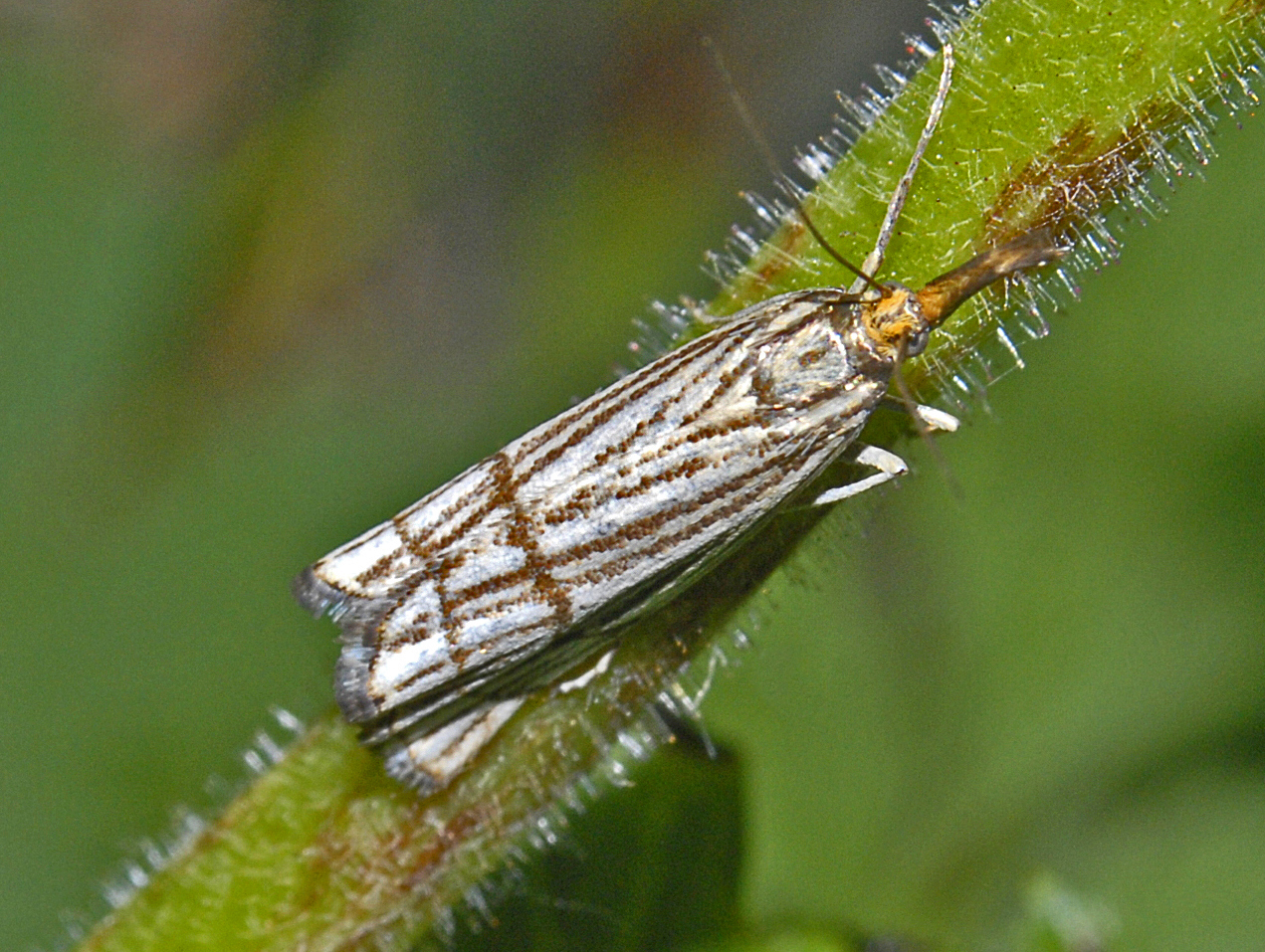
- Chrysocrambus linetella

Scientific classification
- Kingdom: Animalia
- Phylum: Arthropoda
- Clade: Pancrustacea
- Class: Insecta
- Order: Lepidoptera
- Family: Crambidae
- Subfamily: Crambinae
- Tribe: Crambini
- Genus: Chrysocrambus
- Species: C. linetella

Binomial name
- Chrysocrambus linetella (Fabricius, 1781)

Synonyms
- List: Tinea linetella Fabricius, 1781; Chrysocrambus cassentiniellus (Herrich-Schaffer, 1848); Chrysocrambus linetellus; Crambus craterellus var. caspicus Caradja, 1910; Crambus cassentiniellus Herrich-Schäffer, 1848; Crambus cassentiniellus f. distinctus Müller-Rutz, 1920; Crambus cassentiniellus Zeller, 1849; Crambus cassentiniellus f. marioni Dufrane, 1960; Crambus chrysocrossis Meyrick, 1936; Crambus craterellus f. zonatellus Gelin & Lucas, 1914; Tinea lineatus Fabricius, 1798; Chrysocrambus linetella pseudocraterellus Bleszynski, 1958; Chrysocrambus bleszynskii Amsel, 1959

= Chrysocrambus linetella =

Species of moth

Chrysocrambus linetella is a species of moth in the family Crambidae.

== Subspecies ==
- Chrysocrambus linetella linetella (Europe, Transcaucasia, Asia Minor, Syria, Jordan, Iran, Turkestan)
- Chrysocrambus linetella caspicus (Caradja, 1910) (Armenia)
- Chrysocrambus linetella pseudocraterellus Bleszynski, 1958 (Iraq, Iran)

== Distribution ==
This species can be found in Great Britain, France, Spain, Switzerland, Austria, Italy, Slovakia, Hungary, Croatia, Bosnia and Herzegovina, Albania, Montenegro, the Republic of North Macedonia, Greece, Bulgaria, Turkey, Romania, Transcaucasia, Asia Minor, Armenia, Syria, Jordan, Iraq, Iran, and Turkmenistan.

== Description ==
The wingspan is 20–27 mm. The basic color of the upperside forewings is whitish, with several longitudinal brown lines and two transverse brown lines.

It is very similar to Chrysocrambus craterella, but it can be distinguished by the less curved course of the median line and by the lack at the apex of the forewings of a double soft brown line. It could be overlooked as Thisanotia chrysonuchella.

== Biology ==
Adults are on wing from June to the end of August in one generation per year. The larvae feed on roots of grasses (Poaceae species).

== Bibliography ==
- Bassi, G. 1985: Contributo allo studio delle Crambinae (Lepidoptera, Pyralidae). I: Specie mediterranee nuove o interessanti. – Bollettino del Museo Regionale di Scienze Naturali Torino 3 (1): 73–78.
- Bleszynski, S. 1958: Studies on the Crambidae (Lepidoptera). Part XVIII. Revision of the genus Chrysocrambus Blesz. – Acta Zoologica Cracoviensia 2 (34): 845–885.
- Bradley, J.D.Checklist of Lepidoptera Recorded from The British Isles, Second Edition (Revised) (2000)
- Goater, B. – British Pyralid Moths – A Guide to their Identification (1986)
- Heppner, J. B. (1982): Dates of selected Lepidoptera literature for the western hemisphere fauna. — Journal of the Lepidopterologists' Society 36 (2): 87–111.
