= Schizonycha unicolor =

Scientific classification
- Kingdom: Animalia
- Phylum: Arthropoda
- Clade: Pancrustacea
- Class: Insecta
- Order: Coleoptera
- Suborder: Polyphaga
- Infraorder: Scarabaeiformia
- Family: Scarabaeidae
- Genus: Schizonycha
- Species: S. unicolor

Binomial name
- Schizonycha unicolor (Herbst, 1790)

Synonyms
- Melolontha unicolor Herbst, 1790

Species of beetle

Schizonycha unicolor is a species of beetle of the family Scarabaeidae. It is found in South Africa (Cape).

== Description ==
Adults reach a length of about 12.5–15 mm (0.49–0.59 in). They are reddish-castaneous and moderately shining, with the head and limbs darker in some specimens. Females have reduced wings.
