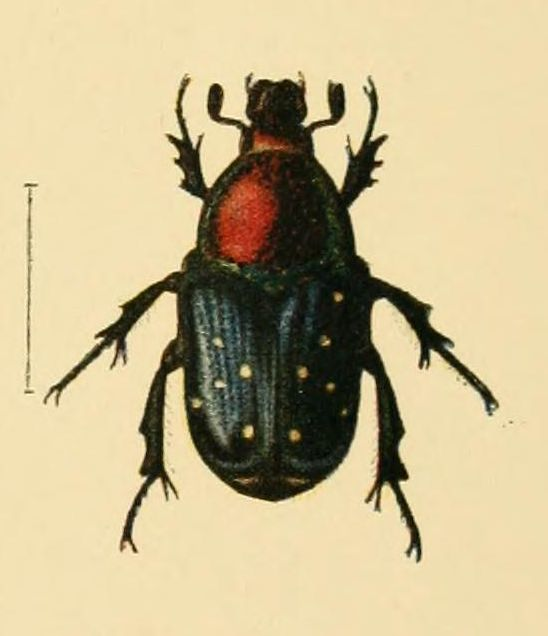

Scientific classification
- Kingdom: Animalia
- Phylum: Arthropoda
- Class: Insecta
- Order: Coleoptera
- Suborder: Polyphaga
- Infraorder: Scarabaeiformia
- Family: Scarabaeidae
- Genus: Clinteria
- Species: C. coerulea

Binomial name
- Clinteria coerulea (Herbst, 1783)

= Clinteria coerulea =

Species of beetle

Clinteria coerulea is a species of flower scarab endemic to southern India. It is known from the plains of Tamil Nadu.

Males have a more slender fore tibia.
