= Béguin =

Béguin (or Beguin) is a French surname, which may refer to:

- Albert Béguin (1901–1957), Swiss academic and translator
- André Béguin, (1897–?), Swiss war criminal and commandant of the World War II Wauwilermoos internment camp
- Bernard Béguin (born 1947), French rally driver
- Daniel Béguin, French politician
- Jean Beguin (1550–1620), French iatrochemist
- Louis Beguin-Billecocq (1865–1957), French diplomat and entomologist
- Marie Anne Isler Béguin (surname Isler Béguin, born 1956), French politician

== See also ==
- 8009 Béguin, main belt asteroid
- Beguine
