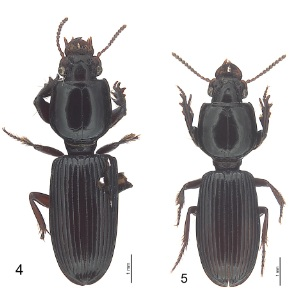
- Sulciclivina attenuata attenuata
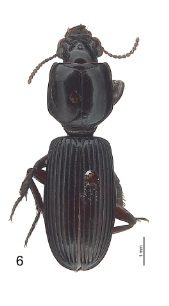
- Sulciclivina attenuata semireticulata

Scientific classification
- Kingdom: Animalia
- Phylum: Arthropoda
- Class: Insecta
- Order: Coleoptera
- Suborder: Adephaga
- Family: Carabidae
- Genus: Sulciclivina
- Species: S. attenuata

Binomial name
- Sulciclivina attenuata (Herbst, 1806)

Synonyms
- Scarites attenuatus Herbst, 1806; Clivina picipes Bonelli, 1813; Clivina melanaria Putzeys, 1846

= Sulciclivina attenuata =

Species of beetle

Sulciclivina attenuata is a species of beetle of the family Carabidae. This species ranges from northern Pakistan over the north of India, Nepal, Bhutan, and Arunachal Pradesh, southward up to the middle parts of Maharashtra. It is also found on Java.

Adults reach a length of about 8.81-8.83 mm.

== Subspecies ==
- Sulciclivina attenuata attenuata (northern Pakistan over the north of India, Nepal, Bhutan, and Arunachal Pradesh, southward up to the middle parts of Maharashtra)
- Sulciclivina attenuata semireticulata Balkenohl, 2023 (Java)
