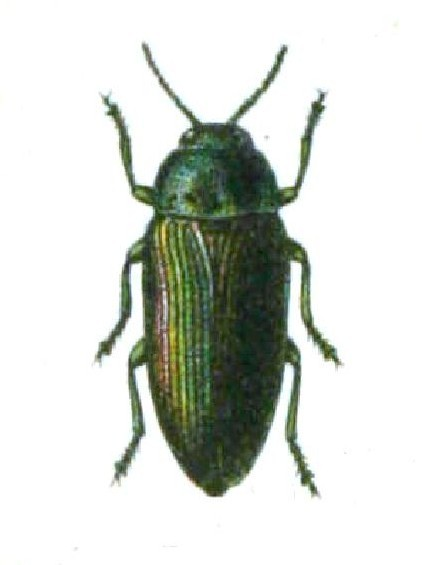

Scientific classification
- Kingdom: Animalia
- Phylum: Arthropoda
- Class: Insecta
- Order: Coleoptera
- Suborder: Polyphaga
- Infraorder: Elateriformia
- Family: Buprestidae
- Genus: Eurythyrea
- Species: E. quercus

Binomial name
- Eurythyrea quercus (Herbst, 1780)

= Eurythyrea quercus =

Species of beetle

Eurythyrea quercus is a species of metallic wood-boring beetle in the family Buprestidae.
