= Karl Vorbrodt =

Swiss entomologist (1865–1932)

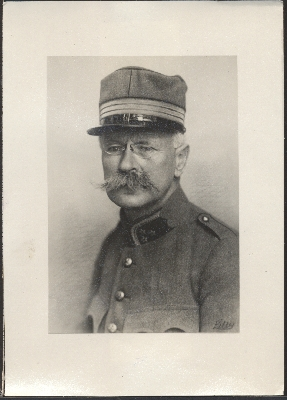
Karl Vorbrodt, Swiss entomologist

Karl Vorbrodt, or Carl, (1865, Wabern - 1932, Morcote) was a Swiss entomologist who specialised in Lepidoptera and microlepidoptera. Vorbrodt published fauna studies, revisions and descriptions of new species in Mitteilungen der Schweizerischen Entomologischen Gesellschaft. Together with Johann Müller-Rutz he wrote Die Schmetterlinge der Schweiz (Butterflies of Switzerland) Bern K.J. Wyss, 1911-1914. His collection of Palearctic Lepidoptera is in the Natural History Museum of Bern.
