= Chrysocrambus mauretanicus =

Scientific classification
- Kingdom: Animalia
- Phylum: Arthropoda
- Clade: Pancrustacea
- Class: Insecta
- Order: Lepidoptera
- Family: Crambidae
- Subfamily: Crambinae
- Tribe: Crambini
- Genus: Chrysocrambus
- Species: C. mauretanicus

Binomial name
- Chrysocrambus mauretanicus (Müller-Rutz, 1931)

Synonyms
- Crambus mauretanicus Müller-Rutz, 1931

Species of moth

Chrysocrambus mauretanicus is a moth in the family Crambidae. It was described by Johann Müller-Rutz in 1931. It is found in North Africa, where it has been recorded from Algeria.
