= Auguste Migette =

French painter (1802–1884)

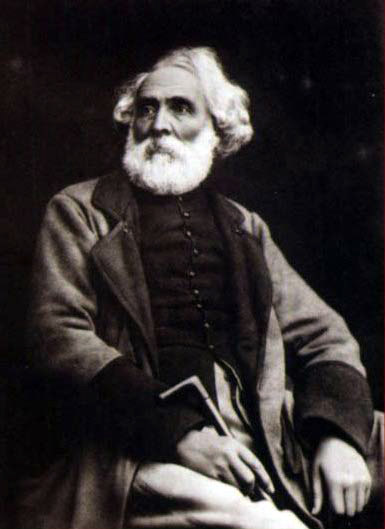
Auguste Migette; photograph by the Marmand Studio

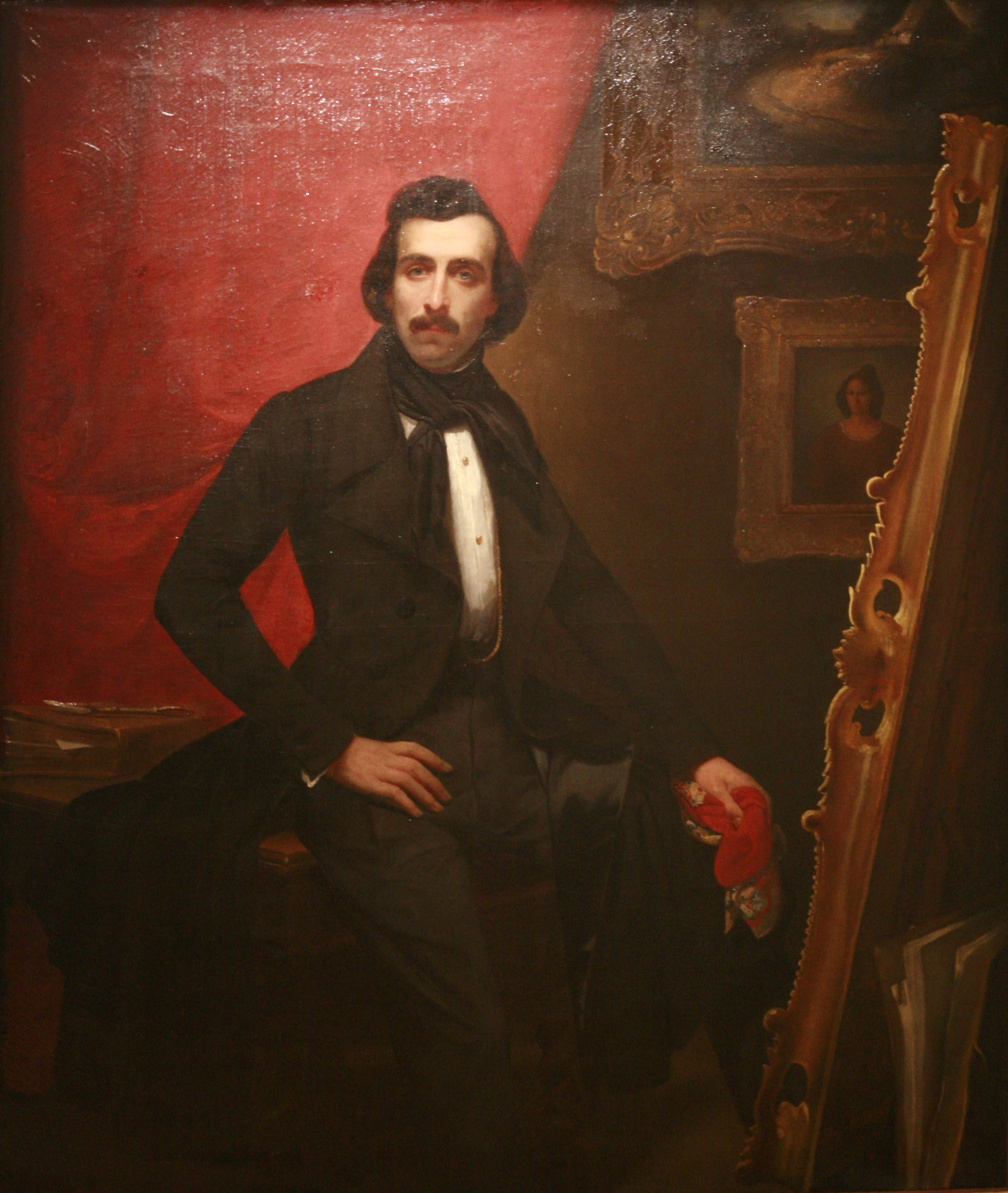
An earlier portrait by Auguste Hussenot

Charles Joseph Auguste Migette (1802 – 1884) was a French artist. A leader of the Metz School style of painting, he was a painter, stage designer, and art teacher.

== Life and career ==
Migette was born 18 June 1802 in Trier in what was then the Sarre Department of France (now part of Germany), the son of Jean Michel Migette and Antoinette Migette (née Neufforg). After the collapse of the French Empire in 1814 the family retreated to Metz in France. Migette was first employed by the Army as a supply hand, then in 1818 enrolled in art school in Metz. In 1825 he was graduated with distinction and moved to Paris to continue his training, first under Eugène Cicéri, then with Louis Hersent.

In 1831 Migette returned to Metz, where he was appointed painter and set decorator for the Metz theater, a position he held until 1875. He also taught art at the high school.

Migette died 30 October 30, 1884 in Longeville-lès-Metz.

== Works ==
Migette is, with Charles-Laurent Maréchal, one of the major protagonists of the artistic movement which Charles Baudelaire described as the Metz School. His work is primarily concerned with the landscapes of his home city. On his death he bequeathed his works to the city of Metz, to be cataloged by his friend Nicolas Adolphe Bellevoye. In 1951 his works were integrated into the collection of the Musées de la Cour d'Or.

== Selected paintings ==
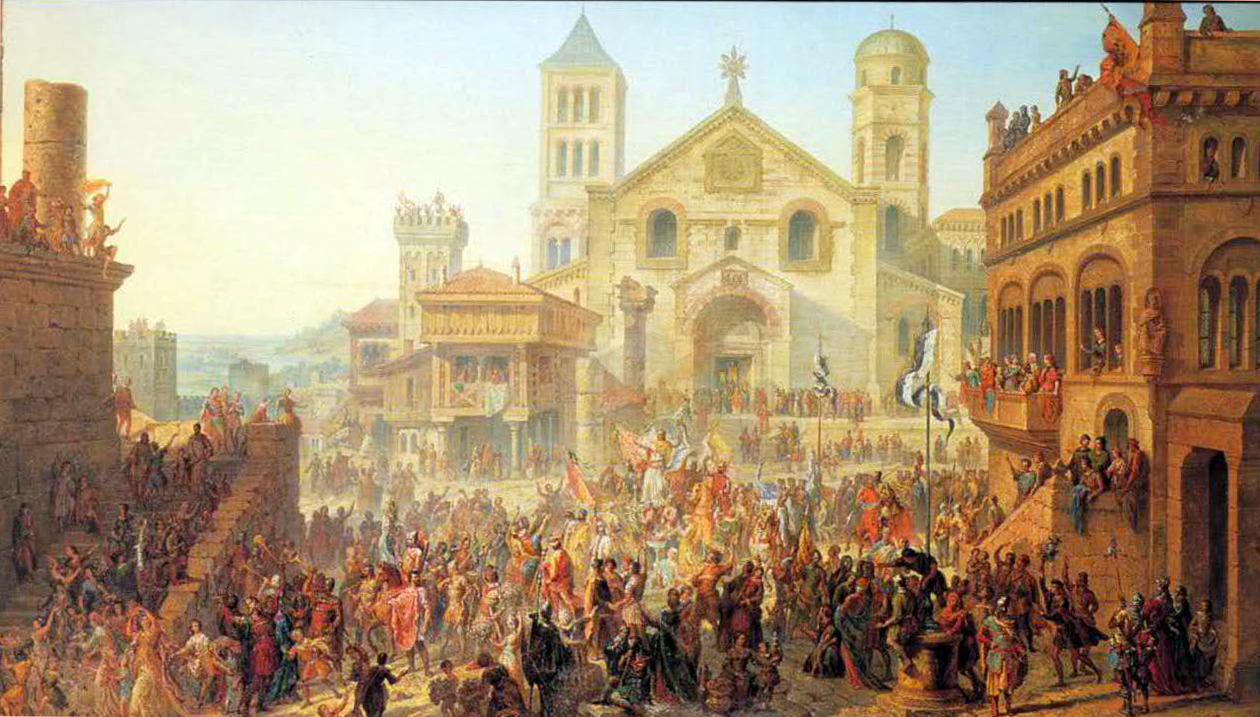
Election of Almobert as First Master Alderman in 1055, initiating the Republic of Metz

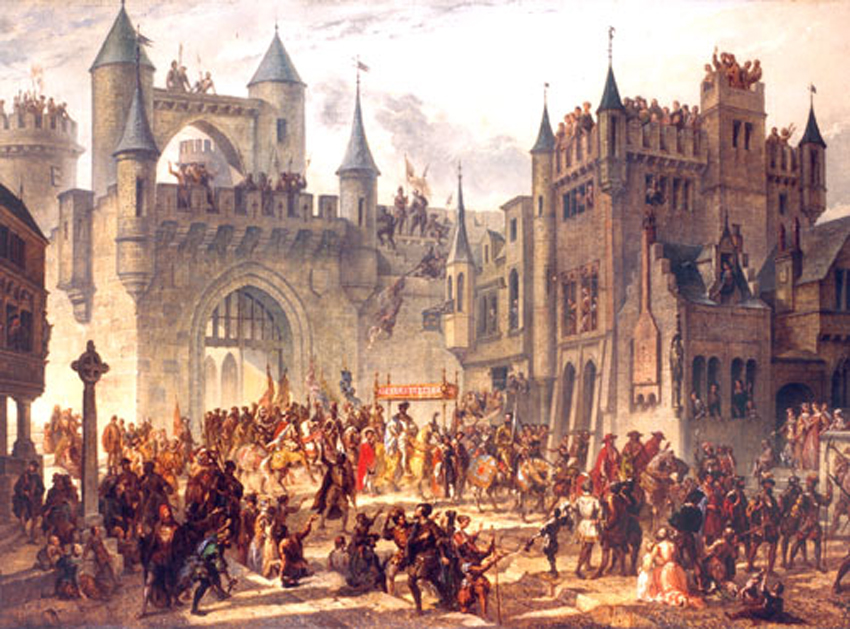
Entrance of King Henry II of France into Metz, ending of the Republic of Metz

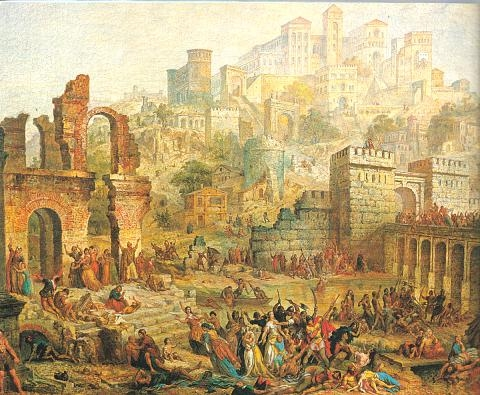
Massacre of the Jews of Metz during the First Crusade
