= Joseph Greene (entomologist) =

Irish entomologist

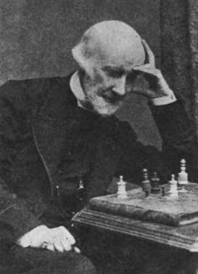
- Born: 1824; Ireland
- Died: 1906 (aged 81–82); Bristol, England
- Scientific career
- Fields: Entomology

Reverend Joseph Greene (1824 – 1906) was a British entomologist and lepidopterist best known for introducing the technique of digging up pupae for rearing. He published a book The Insect Hunter's Companion to popularize insect study.

== Life ==
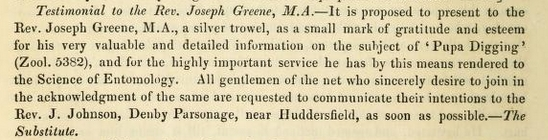
A silver trowel was presented to Greene for his work on digging pupae

Greene studied at Trinity College Dublin, graduating in 1858 with an M.A. degree. The amateur entomologist Alexander Henry Haliday was a friend of Greene and Arthur Rikey Hogan. He became a parish priest serving in Derbyshire, Cotswold, and at the Halton Rectory at various times. He examined and collected insects in the areas where he lived. In 1854 he published the earliest catalogue of the Irish lepidoptera, entitled "A List of Lepidoptera hitherto taken in Ireland as far as the end of the Geometrae". In his popular guide to moth and insect collecting, The Insect Hunter's Companion, he summarised methods for capture of insects, with the book running to several editions. He was a very successful collector of pupae in soil which he collected for rearing, and popularized the technique in 1857. He obtained large numbers of moths and butterflies that were otherwise considered extremely difficult to obtain. He was elected to the Royal Entomological Society in 1850.

He died, aged 82, at his home Rostrevor, Clifton, Bristol.

== Arms ==
Coat of arms of Joseph Greene

Notes
Confirmed 25 January 1896 by Arthur Edward Vicars, Ulster King of Arms.
Crest
On a wreath of the colours a dragon's head erased Azure gorged Or.
Escutcheon
Per pale Or and Azure three bucks trippant counterchanged.
Motto
Nescia Fallere Vita

== Selected publications ==
- "A List of Lepidoptera hitherto taken in Ireland as far as the end of the Geometrae" (1854) Nat. Hist. Review, 1., 165, 238.
- The Insect Hunter's Companion: being instructions for collecting and preserving butterflies and moths and comprising an essay on pupa digging
