= Emil Frey-Gessner =

Swiss entomologist (1826–1917)

Emil Frey-Gessner (19 March 1826, in Aarau – 24 July 1917, in Genf) was a Swiss entomologist. At first Emil Frey-Gessner studied mechanical engineering and was until 1865 technical director in the Frey-Gessner family cotton mill. Later he studied natural sciences at the Eidgenössische Technische Hochschule Zürich and became a District Teacher in Brugg then in the Canton of Aarau. From 1872 he was conservator of the entomological collections at the new museum of Geneva University. He was Dr. hc of the University of Geneva.

== Works ==
Partial list

- Frey-Gessner, E. 1862 Beiträge zur Hemiptern-Fauna des Ober-Wallis. Mittheilungen der Schweizerischen entomologischen Gesellschaft, Schaffhausen 1 (1862-1865) (1) 24-31
- Frey-Gessner, E. 1862 Ein neuer Anthocoride. Mittheilungen der Schweizerischen entomologischen Gesellschaft, Schaffhausen 1 (1862-1865) (1) 31-32
- Frey-Gessner, E. 1863: Die Salden der Umgegend von Aarau. Mittheilungen der Schweizerischen entomologischen Gesellschaft, Schaffhausen 1 (1862-1865) (4) 116-117
- Frey-Gessner, E. 1863: Drei neue Hemiptern. Mittheilungen der Schweizerischen entomologischen Gesellschaft, Schaffhausen 1 (1862-1865) (4) 117-119
- Frey-Gessner, E. 1863: Orthopterologisches. [Ueber Chorthippus stigmaticus Ramb]. Mittheilungen der Schweizerischen entomologischen Gesellschaft, Schaffhausen 1 (1862-1865) (4) 120
- Frey-Gessner, E. 1863 Orthopterologisches. [Ueber Chorthippus stigmaticus Ramb]. Mittheilungen der Schweizerischen entomologischen Gesellschaft, Schaffhausen 1 (1862-1865) (4) 120
- Frey-Gessner, E. 1865. Orthopterologisches. [Chorthippus= Stenobothrus stigmaticus Ramb. in Wallis.] Mithh. schweiz. ent. Ges., Lausanne, 1, p. 120.
- Frey-Gessner, E. 1865. Beitrag zur rhaetischen Orthopterenfauna. Jahresber. Naturf. Ges. Graubünden 10 [1863-64]: 30–37; Chur.
- Frey-Gessner, E. 1868. [Einige Orthoptern und deren Vorkommen] Mitt. Schweiz. Entomol. Ges. 2 [1866]: 150.
- Frey-Gessner, E. 1872. Kurze Sammelnotiz aus dem Wallis. Mitt. Schweiz. Entomol. Ges. 3: 17–18.
- Frey-Gessner, E. 1872. Orthopterologisches. Mitt. Schweiz. Entomol. Ges. 4: 7–20, pl. 1.
- Frey-Gessner, E. 1880. Die Orthopteren des Kantons Aargau Mitt. Aargau. Naturf. Ges. 2: 1–17.
- Frey-Gessner, E. 1881. Matériaux pour servir à la faune des insectes de Valais. (Orthoptères). Bull. Soc.Murith. 10 [1880]: 67–86.
- Frey-Gessner, E. 1893. Orthoptern, gesammelt in Bulgarien von Hrn. Prof. Dr. A. Forel. Mitt. Schweiz. Entomol. Ges.8: 397–403.
- Frey-Gessner, E. 1892. Characters for the determination of the families of Hymenoptera. Bull. Soc. Murith 13: 37-48. Pls. i, ii.
- Frey-Gessner, E. 1901. Hyménoptères du Valais. Famille Apidae. Bull. Murithienne 30: 78-154.
- Frey-Gessner, E. 1899-1912. Hymenoptera, Apidae. Pp.vi + 319. In Fauna Insectorum Helvetiae, Vol. I, viii + 392 pp. Vol. II, Bern: Published as supplements to Mitteilungen der Schweizerischen Entomologischen Gesellschaft.
- Frey-Gessner, E. Souvenir d'excursions d'un entomologiste dans la d'Annivers (1865-1900) suivi de la liste des Coléopteres et Lépidoptères intéressants notés par M. le chanoine E. Favre
- Frey-Gessner, E.1894. Tables analytiques pour la détermination des hyménoptères du Valais. Suite. Fam. Sapygidae, Scoliadae, Mutillidae et Trigonalidae. Bull. soc. Murith années 1892 et 1893, fascicules XXI et XXII, 3-23.
- Frey-Gessner, E.1894 Tables analytiques pour la détermination des hyménoptères du Valais.Fam. XV. Vespidae. Bull. soc. Murith. années 1892 et 1893, fascicules XXI et XXII,24-93.
- Frey-Gessner, E.1894 Orthoptera, gesammelt in der Provinz Oran in Nordafrika, von den Herren Prof. Dr. Aug. Forel und Dr. L. Zehntner im Frühjahr 1893. Mitteilungen der Schweizerischen Entomologischen Gesellschaft 9:108

== Collections ==
His collections of Crabronidae are held by the Natural History Museum, Vienna, Apidae, Sphegidae und Chrysididae are in Natural History Museum of Bern, Orthoptera are in Genf .Other specimens are in Zoological Museum Amsterdam and Solothurn.

== See also ==
- George Meyer-Darcis
- Henri Louis Frédéric de Saussure
