= Chrysocrambus similimellus =

Scientific classification
- Kingdom: Animalia
- Phylum: Arthropoda
- Clade: Pancrustacea
- Class: Insecta
- Order: Lepidoptera
- Family: Crambidae
- Subfamily: Crambinae
- Tribe: Crambini
- Genus: Chrysocrambus
- Species: C. similimellus

Binomial name
- Chrysocrambus similimellus (Müller-Rutz, 1931)

Synonyms
- Crambus similimellus Müller-Rutz, 1931; Crambus similimellus f. umbrosellus Müller-Rutz, 1931

Species of moth

Chrysocrambus similimellus is a moth in the family Crambidae. It was described by Johann Müller-Rutz in 1931. It is found in North Africa, where it has been recorded from Algeria and Tunisia.
