= Chrysocrambus major =

Scientific classification
- Kingdom: Animalia
- Phylum: Arthropoda
- Clade: Pancrustacea
- Class: Insecta
- Order: Lepidoptera
- Family: Crambidae
- Subfamily: Crambinae
- Tribe: Crambini
- Genus: Chrysocrambus
- Species: C. major

Binomial name
- Chrysocrambus major (Müller-Rutz, 1931)#

Synonyms
- Crambus mauretanicus f. major Müller-Rutz, 1931

Species of moth

Chrysocrambus major is a moth in the family Crambidae. It was described by Johann Müller-Rutz in 1931. It is found in North Africa, where it has been recorded from Algeria.
