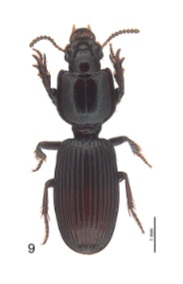

Scientific classification
- Kingdom: Animalia
- Phylum: Arthropoda
- Class: Insecta
- Order: Coleoptera
- Suborder: Adephaga
- Family: Carabidae
- Genus: Sulciclivina
- Species: S. basiangusta

Binomial name
- Sulciclivina basiangusta Balkenohl, 2023

= Sulciclivina basiangusta =

Species of beetle

Sulciclivina basiangusta is a species of beetle of the family Carabidae. This species is only known from the type locality Mawphlang, Meghalaya, in the north of India.

Adults reach a length of about 6.91 mm and have a glossy, piceous colour. The labrum, intermediate and hind leg are fuscous, while the antenna and tarsomeres of the front leg are fuscous. The supraantennal plate at the margin is translucent-fuscous.

== Etymology ==
The species name refers to the extraordinarily small base of the pronotum and is combined from the Latin noun for base (basis) and the Latin adjective for narrow in the feminine form (angusta).
