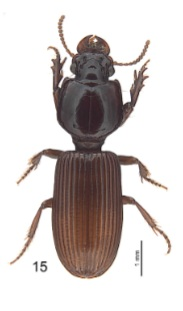

Scientific classification
- Kingdom: Animalia
- Phylum: Arthropoda
- Class: Insecta
- Order: Coleoptera
- Suborder: Adephaga
- Family: Carabidae
- Genus: Sulciclivina
- Species: S. curvata

Binomial name
- Sulciclivina curvata Balkenohl, 2023

= Sulciclivina curvata =

Species of beetle

Sulciclivina curvata is a species of beetle of the family Carabidae. This species is found on Java.

Adults reach a length of about 6.99 mm and have a glossy, piceous colour. The labrum, intermediate and hind leg are fuscous and the antenna pale fuscous. The supraantennal plates are distinctly translucent-fuscous at the margin and slightly at the middle.

== Etymology ==
The species name refers to the curved and distorted apical third of the gonocoxite by the Latin adjective for bent in the feminine form (curvata).
