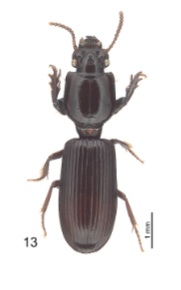
- Sulciclivina striata striata
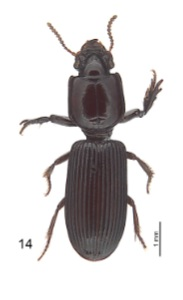
- Sulciclivina striata kottea

Scientific classification
- Kingdom: Animalia
- Phylum: Arthropoda
- Clade: Pancrustacea
- Class: Insecta
- Order: Coleoptera
- Suborder: Adephaga
- Family: Carabidae
- Genus: Sulciclivina
- Species: S. striata

Binomial name
- Sulciclivina striata (Putzeys, 1846)

Synonyms
- Clivina striata Putzeys, 1846

= Sulciclivina striata =

Species of beetle

Sulciclivina striata is a species of beetle of the family Carabidae. This species ranges from northern India (Uttar Pradesh) to Tamil Nadu in the south. It is also found in Sri Lanka.

Adults reach a length of about 6.4–6.5 mm and have a glossy, piceous colour. The labrum, intermediate and hind leg are fuscous, while the antenna and tarsomere are fuscous. The supraantennal plates at the margin are slightly translucent-fuscous.

== Subspecies ==
- Sulciclivina striata striata (from northern India (Uttar Pradesh) to Tamil Nadu in the south)
- Sulciclivina striata kottea Balkenohl, 2023 (Sri Lanka)
