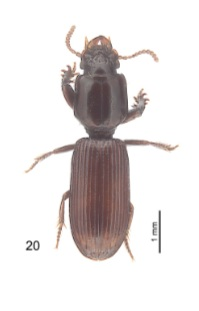
- Sulciclivina sagittaria sagittaria
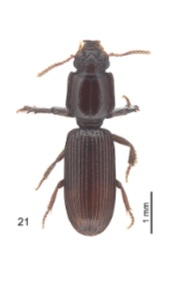
- Sulciclivina sagittaria singaporensis

Scientific classification
- Kingdom: Animalia
- Phylum: Arthropoda
- Class: Insecta
- Order: Coleoptera
- Suborder: Adephaga
- Family: Carabidae
- Genus: Sulciclivina
- Species: S. sagittaria

Binomial name
- Sulciclivina sagittaria (Bates, 1892)

Synonyms
- Clivina sagittaria Bates, 1892

= Sulciclivina sagittaria =

Species of beetle

Sulciclivina sagittaria is a species of beetle of the family Carabidae. This species is found in Myanmar and on the Malayan peninsula.

Adults reach a length of about 4.87–4.63 mm and have a glossy, piceous colour. The mouthparts, elytron, intermediate and hind leg and tarsomeres of the front leg are fuscous, while the antenna and palpomeres are more pale fuscous. The anterior part of the supraantennal plate is translucent-fuscous at the margin.

== Etymology ==
The species name refers to the curved and distorted apical third of the gonocoxite by the Latin adjective for bent in the feminine form (curvata).

== Subspecies ==
- Sulciclivina sagittaria sagittaria (Myanmar)
- Sulciclivina sagittaria singaporensis Balkenohl, 2023 (Malayan peninsula)
