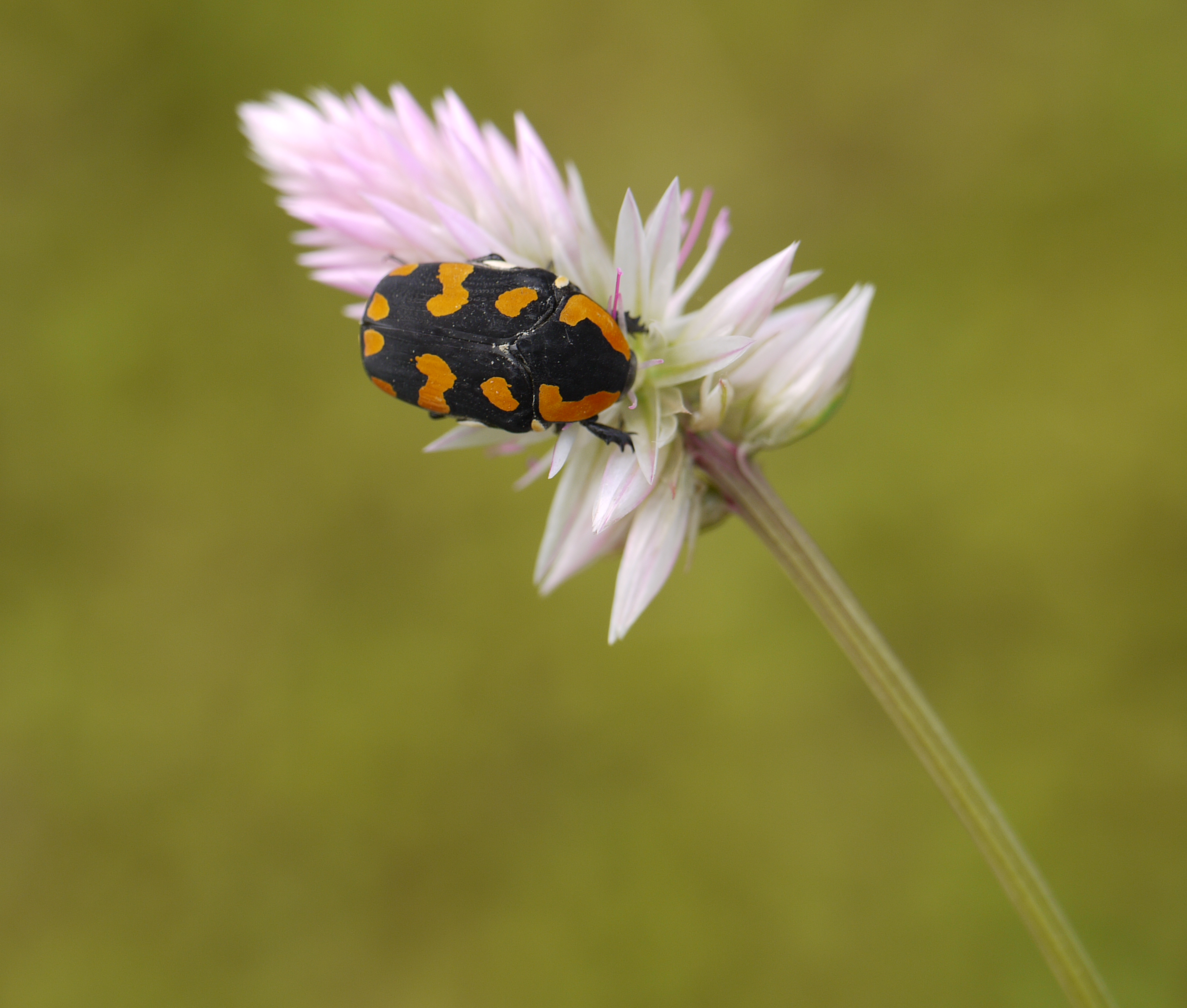

Scientific classification
- Kingdom: Animalia
- Phylum: Arthropoda
- Class: Insecta
- Order: Coleoptera
- Suborder: Polyphaga
- Infraorder: Scarabaeiformia
- Family: Scarabaeidae
- Subfamily: Cetoniinae
- Tribe: Gymnetini
- Genus: Clinteria
- Species: C. klugi

Binomial name
- Clinteria klugi (Hope, 1831)

= Clinteria klugi =

Species of beetle

Clinteria klugi is a species of flower chafer found in India. Like other chafers, the larvae feed on roots of plants and the adults visit flowers.
