= Karl Rost =

German entomologist and insect dealer

Karl Rost sometimes Carl (1859–1918) was a German entomologist and insect dealer. After 1886 Rost was an insect dealer (Insekten-Händler) and professional insect collector in Berlin. He collected insects later offered for sale in Spain and Greece (annually from 1887 to 1898). In 1899 he went on an expedition to Siberia and in 1900 and 1901 collected in the Caucasus. In 1903 he went to Japan to collect insects for the Swiss collector George Meyer-Darcis (He went to Japan again in 1911) after two years in North-West India (1906 for Meyer-Darcis and 1907 for his dealership). Rost described many new species from these regions.

Parts of his personal collection are in the Museum für Naturkunde in Berlin and other parts are in the Zoological Museum Amsterdam. The ZMA collections were merged into Naturalis in Leiden. The rest were privately sold, many to the dealership Staudinger - Bang-Haas. His name is honoured by Antoine Henri Grouvelle in the specific epithet of the false skin beetle Diphyllus rosti (Grouvelle, 1916) and that of the spider beetle Ptinomorphus rosti described by Maurice Pic in 1896. His publications include:

- Rost, C. (1908): Ein neuer Carabus aus Japan. (Col.) Deutsche Entomologische Zeitschrift (Berliner Entomologische Zeitschrift und Deutsche Entomologische Zeitschrift in Vereinigung) – 1908: 32 - 33.pdf
- Rost, C. (1892): Plectes polychrous Rost n. sp. Deutsche Entomologische Zeitschrift (Berliner Entomologische Zeitschrift und Deutsche Entomologische Zeitschrift in Vereinigung) – 1892: 401 - pdf
