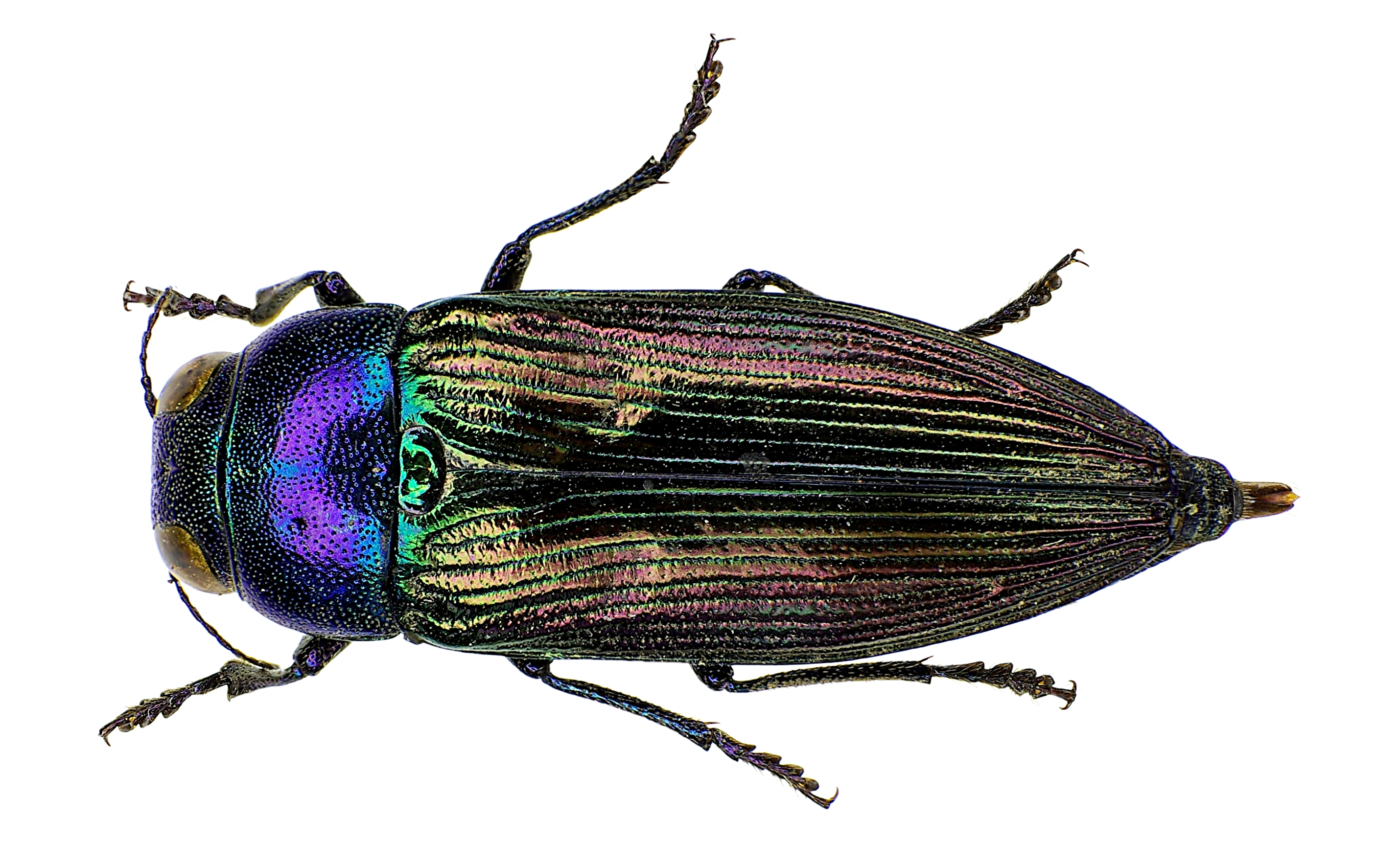
- Eurythyrea austriaca

Scientific classification
- Kingdom: Animalia
- Phylum: Arthropoda
- Class: Insecta
- Order: Coleoptera
- Suborder: Polyphaga
- Infraorder: Elateriformia
- Family: Buprestidae
- Genus: Eurythyrea; Dejean, 1833

= Eurythyrea =

Genus of beetles

Eurythyrea is a genus of beetles in the family Buprestidae, containing the following species:

- Eurythyrea aurata (Pallas, 1776)
- Eurythyrea austriaca (Linnaeus, 1767)
- Eurythyrea bilyi Weidlich, 1987
- Eurythyrea eao Semenov, 1895
- Eurythyrea fastidiosa (Rossi, 1790)
- Eurythyrea grandis Deichmuller, 1886
- Eurythyrea longipennis Heer, 1847
- Eurythyrea micans (Fabricius, 1793)
- Eurythyrea oxiana Semenov, 1895
- Eurythyrea quercus (Herbst, 1780)
- Eurythyrea tenuistriata Lewis, 1893
