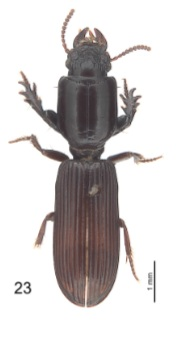

Scientific classification
- Kingdom: Animalia
- Phylum: Arthropoda
- Class: Insecta
- Order: Coleoptera
- Suborder: Adephaga
- Family: Carabidae
- Genus: Sulciclivina
- Species: S. andrewesi

Binomial name
- Sulciclivina andrewesi Balkenohl, 2023

= Sulciclivina andrewesi =

Species of beetle

Sulciclivina andrewesi is a species of beetle of the family Carabidae. This species is only known the from type locality Pusa, Bihar, in India.

Adults reach a length of about 6.94 mm and have a glossy, piceous colour. The mouthparts, antenna, elytron, intermediate and hind leg and tarsomeres of the front leg are fuscous, and the palpomeres more pale fuscous. The anterior part of the supraantennal plate is slightly translucent-fuscous at the margin.

== Etymology ==
The species is named in honour of Herbert Edward Andrewes (1863–1950) who provided a solid basis for the investigation of Asian Scaritinae.
