= Karel Brančik =

Hungarian naturalist

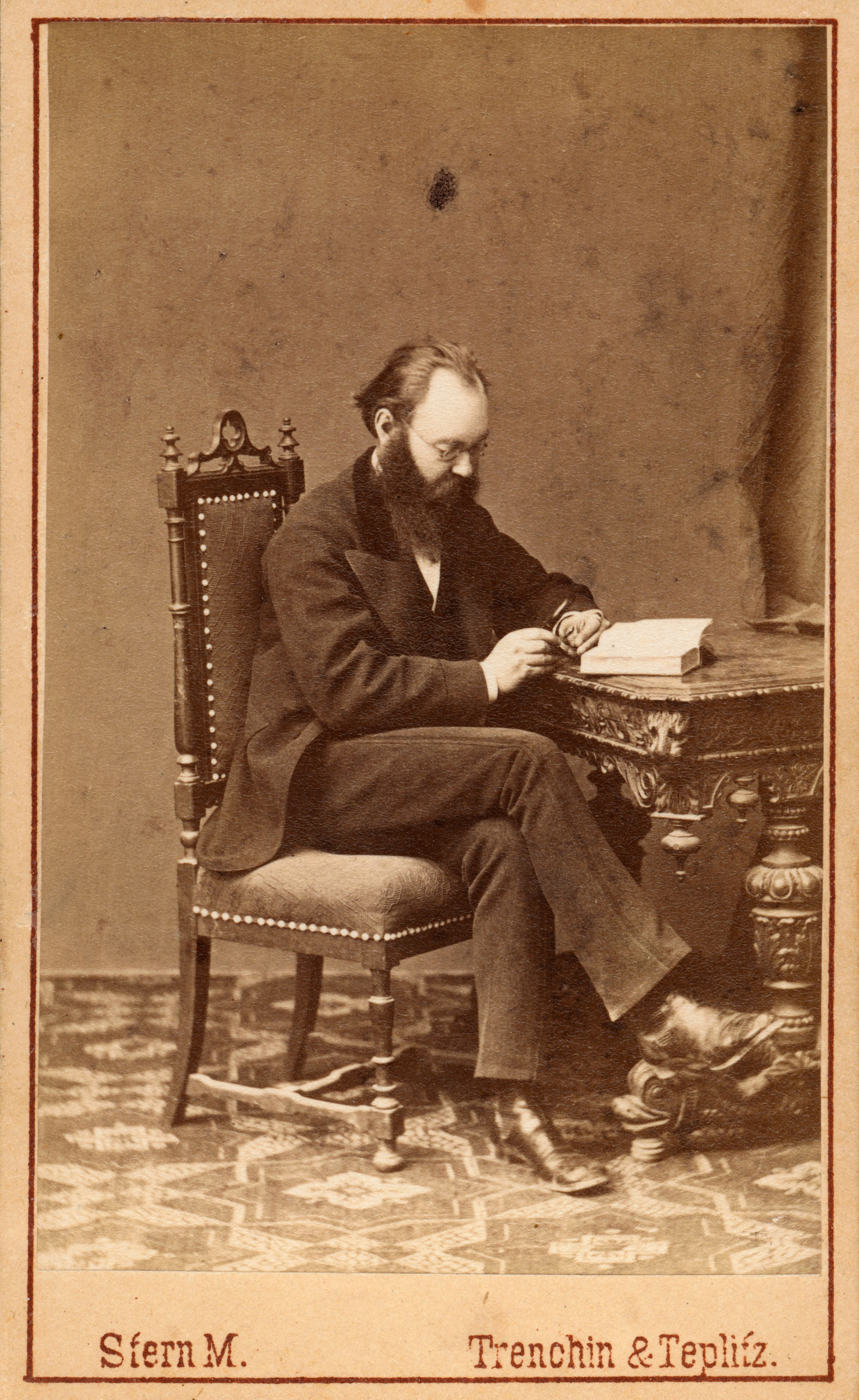
- Born: March 13, 1842; Stará Bystrica, Austrian Empire (today in Slovakia)
- Died: 19 November 1915; Trenčín, Austria-Hungary (today in Slovakia)
- Occupations: doctor and naturalist

Karel Brančik (Note: His first name is also given as Karol or Karl or Carolus, while his last name is also given as Brančsik) (13 March 1842 – 18 November 1915) was a Hungarian doctor and naturalist. He practised medicine at Trenčín and was interested in entomology, malacology and botany. In 1913 he founded the museum at Trenčín. He made a large collection of Coleoptera which was acquired by the Vienna entomologist Eduard Knirsch (1869–1955) before his collection was acquired by the Field Museum of Natural History, Chicago.

== Sources ==
- Anthony Musgrave (1932). Bibliography of Australian Entomology, 1775–1930, with biographical notes on authors and collectors, Royal Zoological Society of News South Wales (Sydney) : viii + 380.
- Guido Nonveiller (2001). Pioneers of the Research on the Insects of Dalmatia. Croatian Natural History Museum (Zagreb) : 390 p.
