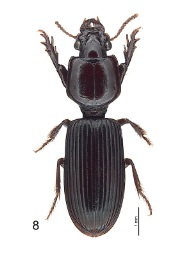

Scientific classification
- Kingdom: Animalia
- Phylum: Arthropoda
- Class: Insecta
- Order: Coleoptera
- Suborder: Adephaga
- Family: Carabidae
- Genus: Sulciclivina
- Species: S. mikirensis

Binomial name
- Sulciclivina mikirensis Balkenohl, 2023

= Sulciclivina mikirensis =

Species of beetle

Sulciclivina mikirensis is a species of beetle of the family Carabidae. This species is only known from the type locality north of the Mikir-Hills in Assam, India.

Adults reach a length of about 7.69 mm and have a glossy, piceous colour. The labrum, intermediate and hind leg are dark-fuscous, while the antenna and tarsomeres of the front leg are fuscous. The supraantennal plate is translucent-fuscous up to the top of the convexity.

== Etymology ==
The species name refers to the Mikir Hills in Assam, the collection locality of the holotype.
