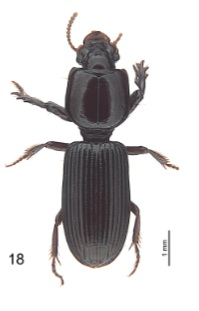
- Sulciclivina karelkulti karelkulti
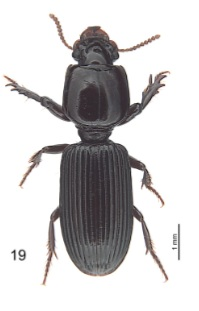
- Sulciclivina karelkulti medanensis

Scientific classification
- Kingdom: Animalia
- Phylum: Arthropoda
- Class: Insecta
- Order: Coleoptera
- Suborder: Adephaga
- Family: Carabidae
- Genus: Sulciclivina
- Species: S. karelkulti

Binomial name
- Sulciclivina karelkulti Balkenohl, 2023

= Sulciclivina karelkulti =

Species of beetle

Sulciclivina karelkulti is a species of beetle of the family Carabidae. This species is found on the Malayan peninsula and northern Sumatra.

Adults reach a length of about 6.66–6.95 mm and have a glossy, piceous colour. The labrum, intermediate and hind leg are fuscous and the antenna pale fuscous. The supraantennal plates are fuscous and translucent at the margin.

== Etymology ==
The species is named in honour of the Czech entomologist Karel Kult, specialist in Scaritinae, who worked intensively on Clivinini between 1940 and 1960.

== Subspecies ==
- Sulciclivina karelkulti karelkulti (Malayan peninsula)
- Sulciclivina karelkulti medanensis Balkenohl, 2023 (northern Sumatra)
