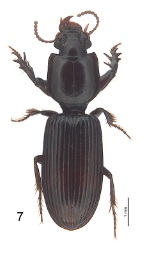

Scientific classification
- Kingdom: Animalia
- Phylum: Arthropoda
- Class: Insecta
- Order: Coleoptera
- Suborder: Adephaga
- Family: Carabidae
- Genus: Sulciclivina
- Species: S. bhamoensis

Binomial name
- Sulciclivina bhamoensis (Bates, 1892)

Synonyms
- Clivina attenuata var. bhamoensis Bates, 1892

= Sulciclivina bhamoensis =

Species of beetle

Sulciclivina bhamoensis is a species of beetle of the family Carabidae. This species is found in Myanmar and India (Assam).

Adults reach a length of about 8.25 mm and have a glossy, piceous colour. The labrum, intermediate and hind leg are dark-fuscous, while the antenna and tarsomeres of the front leg are fuscous. The supraantennal plate at the extreme margin is translucent-fuscous.
