= Chrysocrambus brutiellus =

Scientific classification
- Kingdom: Animalia
- Phylum: Arthropoda
- Clade: Pancrustacea
- Class: Insecta
- Order: Lepidoptera
- Family: Crambidae
- Subfamily: Crambinae
- Tribe: Crambini
- Genus: Chrysocrambus
- Species: C. brutiellus

Binomial name
- Chrysocrambus brutiellus Bassi, 1985

Species of moth

Chrysocrambus brutiellus is a species of moth in the family Crambidae. Discovered in 1985, it is found in parts of Italy.
