= Chrysocrambus chrysonuchelloides =

Scientific classification
- Kingdom: Animalia
- Phylum: Arthropoda
- Clade: Pancrustacea
- Class: Insecta
- Order: Lepidoptera
- Family: Crambidae
- Subfamily: Crambinae
- Tribe: Crambini
- Genus: Chrysocrambus
- Species: C. chrysonuchelloides

Binomial name
- Chrysocrambus chrysonuchelloides (Rothschild, 1925)

Synonyms
- Crambus craterellus chrysonuchelloides Rothschild, 1925; Crambus maghrebellus Marion, 1950; Crambus maghrebellus rungsellus Marion, 1950

Species of moth

Chrysocrambus chrysonuchelloides is a moth in the family Crambidae. It was described by Rothschild in 1925. It is found in Morocco.
