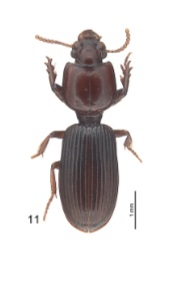

Scientific classification
- Kingdom: Animalia
- Phylum: Arthropoda
- Class: Insecta
- Order: Coleoptera
- Suborder: Adephaga
- Family: Carabidae
- Genus: Sulciclivina
- Species: S. splendida

Binomial name
- Sulciclivina splendida Balkenohl, 2023

= Sulciclivina splendida =

Species of beetle

Sulciclivina splendida is a species of beetle of the family Carabidae. This species is only known from the type localities in Barway and Nagpur, India.

Adults reach a length of about 5.15 mm and have a glossy, piceous colour. The labrum, intermediate and hind leg are fuscous, while the antenna and tarsomeres of the front leg are fuscous. The sSupraantennal plate at the margin and anterior part of the lateral margin of the pronotum are translucent-fuscous.

== Etymology ==
The species name refers to the smooth and glossy interval eight and apex of the elytron by the Latin adjective for smooth and shiny in the feminine form (splendida).
