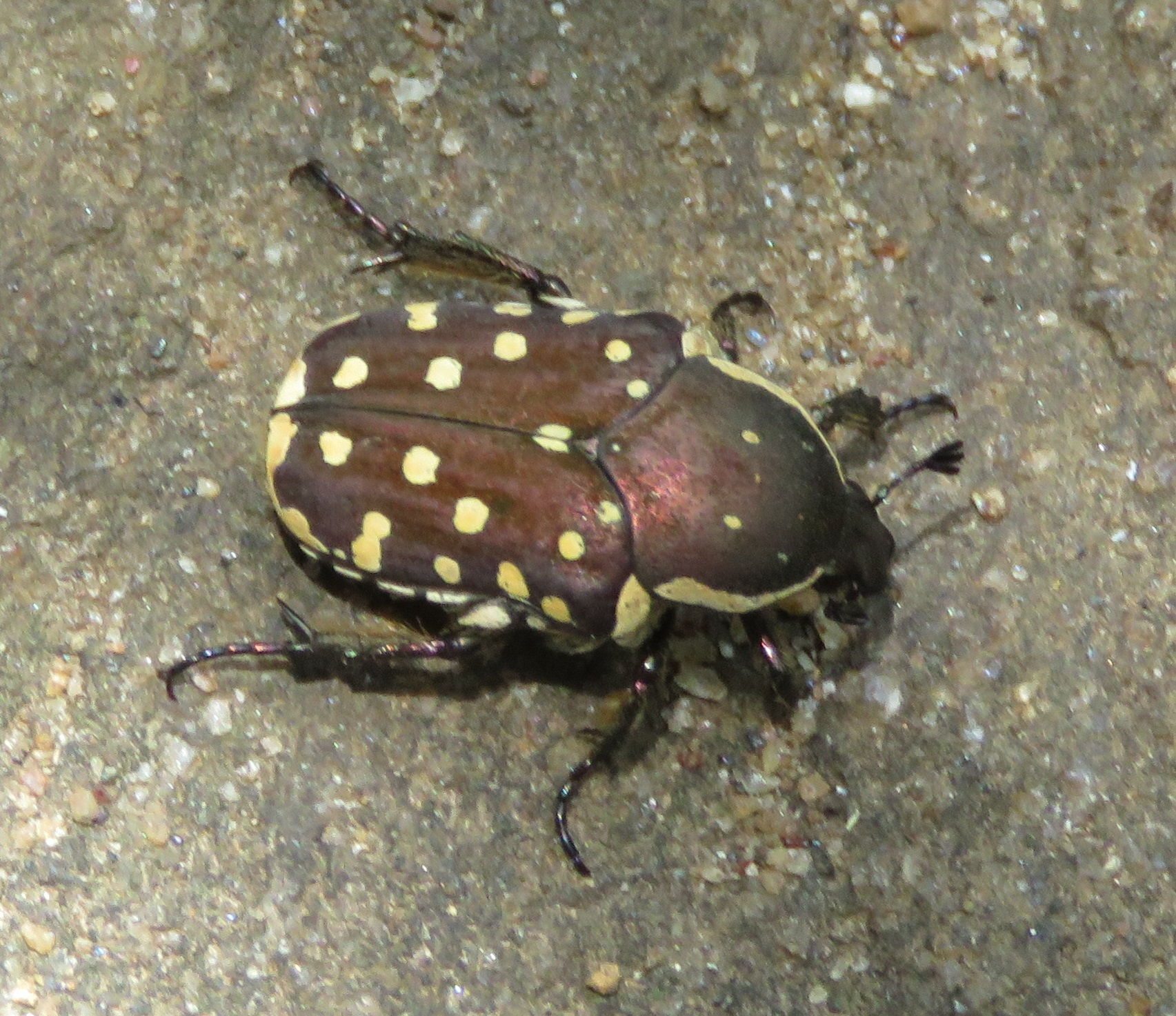

Scientific classification
- Domain: Eukaryota
- Kingdom: Animalia
- Phylum: Arthropoda
- Class: Insecta
- Order: Coleoptera
- Suborder: Polyphaga
- Infraorder: Scarabaeiformia
- Family: Scarabaeidae
- Genus: Clinteria
- Species: C. chloronota

Binomial name
- Clinteria chloronota Blanchard, 1850

= Clinteria chloronota =

Species of insect

Clinteria chloronota is a species of flower scarab endemic to Sri Lanka.
