= Chrysocrambus lambessellus =

Scientific classification
- Kingdom: Animalia
- Phylum: Arthropoda
- Clade: Pancrustacea
- Class: Insecta
- Order: Lepidoptera
- Family: Crambidae
- Subfamily: Crambinae
- Tribe: Crambini
- Genus: Chrysocrambus
- Species: C. lambessellus

Binomial name
- Chrysocrambus lambessellus (Caradja, 1910)

Synonyms
- Crambus craterellus var. lambessellus Caradja, 1910; Chrysocrambus mauretanicus marioni Whalley, 1960; Crambus similimellus f. ambustellus Müller-Rutz, 1931

Species of moth

Chrysocrambus lambessellus is a moth in the family Crambidae. It was described by Aristide Caradja in 1910. It is found in North Africa, where it has been recorded from Algeria.
