= Sulciclivina =

Scientific classification
- Kingdom: Animalia
- Phylum: Arthropoda
- Class: Insecta
- Order: Coleoptera
- Suborder: Adephaga
- Family: Carabidae
- Subfamily: Scaritinae
- Tribe: Clivinini
- Subtribe: Thliboclivinina
- Genus: Sulciclivina; Balkenohl, 2022

Genus of beetles

Sulciclivina is a genus of in the beetle family Carabidae.

== Species ==
- Sulciclivina andrewesi Balkenohl, 2023
- Sulciclivina attenuata (Herbst, 1806)
- Sulciclivina basiangusta Balkenohl, 2023
- Sulciclivina bhamoensis (Bates, 1892)
- Sulciclivina coxisetosa Balkenohl, 2023
- Sulciclivina curvata Balkenohl, 2023
- Sulciclivina karelkulti Balkenohl, 2023
- Sulciclivina mikirensis Balkenohl, 2023
- Sulciclivina oculiangusta Balkenohl, 2023
- Sulciclivina sagittaria (Bates, 1892)
- Sulciclivina splendida Balkenohl, 2023
- Sulciclivina striata (Putzeys, 1846)
- Sulciclivina sulcigera (Putzeys, 1867)
