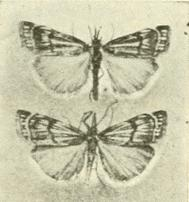

Scientific classification
- Kingdom: Animalia
- Phylum: Arthropoda
- Clade: Pancrustacea
- Class: Insecta
- Order: Lepidoptera
- Family: Crambidae
- Subfamily: Crambinae
- Tribe: Crambini
- Genus: Chrysocrambus
- Species: C. sardiniellus

Binomial name
- Chrysocrambus sardiniellus (Turati, 1911)

Synonyms
- Crambus craterellus sardiniellus Turati, 1911; Chrysocrambus danutae Bleszynski, 1958; Crambus cornutellus Pierce & Metcalfe, 1938

= Chrysocrambus sardiniellus =

Species of moth

Chrysocrambus sardiniellus is a species of moth in the family Crambidae. It is found in Spain and on Sardinia.

The wingspan is 21–22 mm.
