= James Tardy =

Irish naturalist

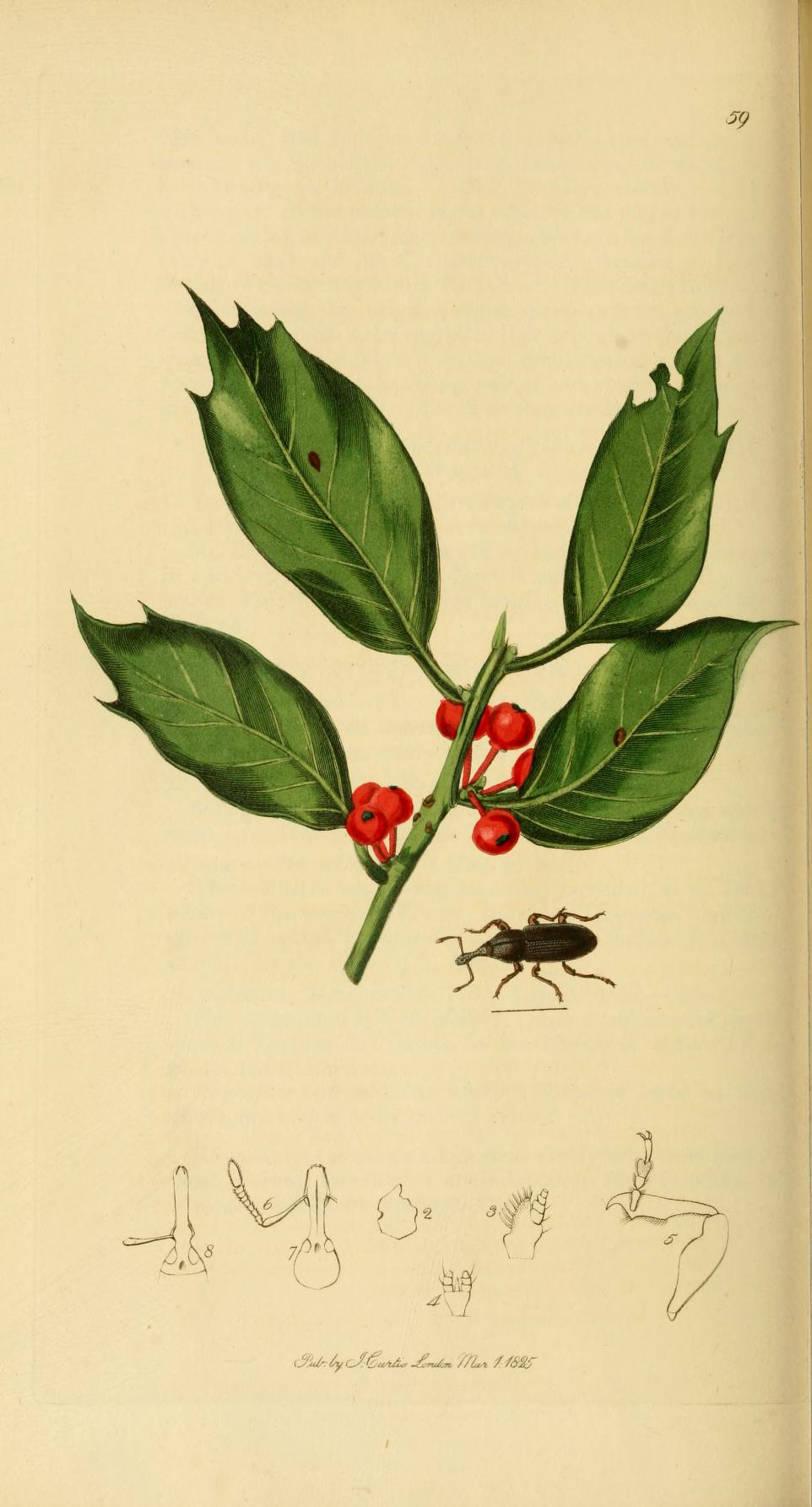
Cossonus Tardii, a beetle discovered by James Tardy. Illustration from British Entomology.

James Tardy (between 1773 and 1787 – 1835) was an Irish naturalist.

Tardy was a friend of Thomas Coulter and Nicholas Aylward Vigors. His collection of 10,000 Irish insects was purchased by Trinity College in 1843. He published nothing himself, but his records appear in other works, notably by Alexander Henry Haliday and Authur Riky Hogan.
