= Chrysocrambus kobelti =

Scientific classification
- Kingdom: Animalia
- Phylum: Arthropoda
- Clade: Pancrustacea
- Class: Insecta
- Order: Lepidoptera
- Family: Crambidae
- Subfamily: Crambinae
- Tribe: Crambini
- Genus: Chrysocrambus
- Species: C. kobelti

Binomial name
- Chrysocrambus kobelti (Saalmüller, 1885)

Synonyms
- Crambus kobelti Saalmüller, 1885; Crambus kobelti tingitanellus Chrétien in Oberthür, 1922; Crambus harterti Rothschild, 1925

Species of moth

Chrysocrambus kobelti is a moth in the family Crambidae. It was described by Saalmüller in 1885. It is found in North Africa, including Algeria and Morocco.
