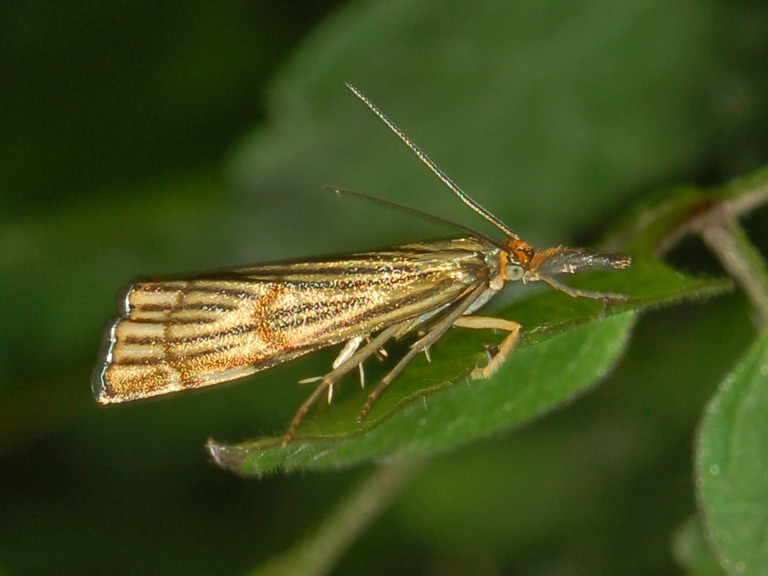
- Chrysocrambus craterellus

Scientific classification
- Kingdom: Animalia
- Phylum: Arthropoda
- Clade: Pancrustacea
- Class: Insecta
- Order: Lepidoptera
- Family: Crambidae
- Subfamily: Crambinae
- Tribe: Crambini
- Genus: Chrysocrambus; Błeszyński, 1957

Synonyms
- Chrysocramboides Bleszynski, 1957

= Chrysocrambus =

Genus of moths

Chrysocrambus is a genus of moths of the family Crambidae described by Stanisław Błeszyński in 1957.

== Species ==
- Chrysocrambus brutiellus Bassi, 1985
- Chrysocrambus chrysonuchelloides (Rothschild, 1925)
- Chrysocrambus craterellus (Scopoli, 1763)
- Chrysocrambus dentuellus (Pierce & Metcalfe, 1938)
- Chrysocrambus kobelti (Saalmüller, 1885)
- Chrysocrambus lambessellus (Caradja, 1910)
- Chrysocrambus linetella (Fabricius, 1781)
- Chrysocrambus major (Müller-Rutz, 1931)
- Chrysocrambus mauretanicus (Müller-Rutz, 1931)
- Chrysocrambus sardiniellus (Turati, 1911)
- Chrysocrambus similimellus (Müller-Rutz, 1931)
- Chrysocrambus syriellus (Zerny, 1934)
