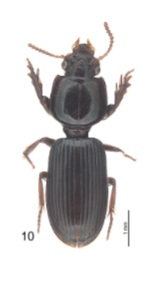

Scientific classification
- Kingdom: Animalia
- Phylum: Arthropoda
- Class: Insecta
- Order: Coleoptera
- Suborder: Adephaga
- Family: Carabidae
- Genus: Sulciclivina
- Species: S. coxisetosa

Binomial name
- Sulciclivina coxisetosa Balkenohl, 2023

= Sulciclivina coxisetosa =

Species of beetle

Sulciclivina coxisetosa is a species of beetle of the family Carabidae. This species is only known from the type locality in Danda Pakhar, Nepal.

Adults reach a length of about 5.63 mm and have a glossy, piceous colour. The labrum, intermediate and hind leg are fuscous, while the antenna and tarsomeres of the front leg are fuscous. The supraantennal plate at the margin and anterior part of lateral margin of the pronotum are translucent-fuscous.

== Etymology ==
The species name refers to the high number of setae on the female gonocoxites.
