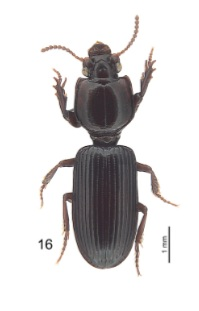

Scientific classification
- Kingdom: Animalia
- Phylum: Arthropoda
- Class: Insecta
- Order: Coleoptera
- Suborder: Adephaga
- Family: Carabidae
- Genus: Sulciclivina
- Species: S. sulcigera

Binomial name
- Sulciclivina sulcigera (Putzeys, 1867)

Synonyms
- Clivina sulcigera Putzeys, 1867

= Sulciclivina sulcigera =

Species of beetle

Sulciclivina sulcigera is a species of beetle of the family Carabidae. This species is found in Vietnam, Laos, Cambodia, Thailand, Malaysia and Indonesia (Sumatra, Java).

Adults reach a length of about 6.6 mm and have a glossy, piceous colour. The labrum, intermediate and hind leg are fuscous and the antenna pale fuscous. The supraantennal plates at the margin are distinctly translucent-fuscous.
