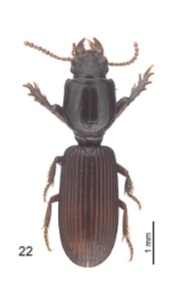

Scientific classification
- Kingdom: Animalia
- Phylum: Arthropoda
- Class: Insecta
- Order: Coleoptera
- Suborder: Adephaga
- Family: Carabidae
- Genus: Sulciclivina
- Species: S. oculiangusta

Binomial name
- Sulciclivina oculiangusta Balkenohl, 2023

= Sulciclivina oculiangusta =

Species of beetle

Sulciclivina oculiangusta is a species of beetle of the family Carabidae. This species is only known the from type locality Kaziranga, Assam, in the north of India.

Adults reach a length of about 5.18 mm and have a glossy, piceous colour. The mouthparts, antenna, elytron, intermediate and hind leg and tarsomeres of the front leg are fuscous, and the palpomeres more pale fuscous. The anterior part of the supraantennal plate is slightly translucent-fuscous at the margin.

== Etymology ==
The species name refers to the small eyes and is combined by the Latin noun for eye in plural (oculi) and the Latin adjective for narrow in the feminine form (angusta).
