= Chrysocrambus dentuellus =

Scientific classification
- Kingdom: Animalia
- Phylum: Arthropoda
- Clade: Pancrustacea
- Class: Insecta
- Order: Lepidoptera
- Family: Crambidae
- Subfamily: Crambinae
- Tribe: Crambini
- Genus: Chrysocrambus
- Species: C. dentuellus

Binomial name
- Chrysocrambus dentuellus (Pierce & Metcalfe, 1938)

Synonyms
- Crambus dentuellus Pierce & Metcalfe, 1938

Species of moth

Chrysocrambus dentuellus is a species of moth in the family Crambidae. It was described by Frank Nelson Pierce and John William Metcalfe in 1938 and is found in Portugal and Spain.

The larvae feed on Festuca ovina.
