= Chrysocrambus syriellus =

Scientific classification
- Kingdom: Animalia
- Phylum: Arthropoda
- Clade: Pancrustacea
- Class: Insecta
- Order: Lepidoptera
- Family: Crambidae
- Subfamily: Crambinae
- Tribe: Crambini
- Genus: Chrysocrambus
- Species: C. syriellus

Binomial name
- Chrysocrambus syriellus (Zerny, 1934)

Synonyms
- Crambus syriellus Zerny, 1934

Species of moth

Chrysocrambus syriellus is a moth in the family Crambidae. It was described by Hans Zerny in 1934. It is found in Turkey, Lebanon, Syria, Iraq and Afghanistan.
