= Jacques de Beaumont =

Swiss biologist (born 1901)

- Born: Jacques Bouthillier de Beaumont; 26 September 1901; Geneva, Switzerland
- Died: 29 September 1985 (aged 84); Bevaix, Switzerland
- Occupation: Director of the Cantonal Museum of Zoology (1943-1967)
- Spouse: Renée Mallet
- Parents: Ernest de Beaumont; Elisabeth L'Hardy
- Scientific career
- Fields: Zoology; Entomology
- Workplaces: University of Lausanne

Jacques de Beaumont (26 September 1901 – 29 September 1985) was a Swiss biologist. Born in Geneva to Ernest de Beaumont and Elisabeth L'Hardy, the granddaughter of Guillaume Henri Dufour. He was a professor at the University of Lausanne and was a curator and subsequently the Director of the Cantonal Museum of Zoology.
