= Alpine Entomology =

Academic journal

- Discipline: Entomology
- Language: English
- Edited by: Jessica Litman

Publication details
- Former names: Mitteilungen der Schweizerischen Entomologischen Gesellschaft; Bulletin de la Société Entomologique Suisse; Journal of the Swiss Entomological Society
- History: 1862-present
- Publisher: Pensoft Publishers on behalf of the Swiss Entomological Society
- Frequency: Continuous
- Open access: Yes
- License: CC BY 4.0
- Impact factor: 1.4 (2025)

Standard abbreviations
- ISO 4: Alp. Entomol.

Indexing
- ISSN: 2535-0889
- LCCN: 2020204397
- OCLC no.: 1024124770

Links
- Journal homepage; Online Archive; Archive (1862–2016)

Alpine Entomology is an open access peer-reviewed academic journal of entomology, published by Pensoft Publishers on behalf of the Swiss Entomological Society.

== History ==
The journal was established in 1862 as Mitteilungen der Schweizerischen Entomologischen Gesellschaft (in German), Bulletin de la Société Entomologique Suisse (in French) and Journal of the Swiss Entomological Society (in English) by the Swiss Entomological Society. It published articles in German, French and later also in English. In the general assembly of the Swiss Entomological Society in March 2017 it was decided to rename the journal to Alpine Entomology and transfer the publishing to Pensoft Publishers. This also made it officially open access.

== Abstracting and indexing ==
The journal is abstracted and indexed in:

- BIOSIS Previews
- CAB Abstracts
- Directory of Open Access Journals
- EBSCO databases
- Index Medicus/MEDLINE/PubMed
- Mir@bel
- ProQuest databases
- Scopus

According to the Journal Citation Reports, the journal has a 2025 impact factor of 1.4.

== Editors-in-chief ==
- 1862—1905: Gustav Stierlin, Naturforschende Gesellschaft Schaffhausen
- 1906—1929: Theodor Steck-Hofmann
- 1930—1945: Heinrich Kutter
- 1946—1953: Jacques de Beaumont, Cantonal Museum of Zoology
- 1954—1975: Fritz Schneider, Swiss Federal Research Institute for Fruit Production, Viticulture and Horticulture
- 1976—1981: Vittorio Delucchi, ETH Zurich
- 1982—1991: Georg Benz, ETH Zurich
- 1992—2001: Gerhard Bächli, University of Zurich
- 2002—2004: Christian Kropf, Natural History Museum of Basel
- 2005—2016: Gerhard Bächli, University of Zurich
- 2017—2023: Thibault Lachat, Bern University of Applied Sciences, Swiss Federal Institute for Forest, Snow and Landscape Research
- 2023—present: Jessica Litman, Muséum d'Histoire Naturelle de Neuchâtel
