= Johann Christian Friedrich Märkel =

Johann Christian Friedrich Märkel (27 November 1790 in Medingen – 15 March 1860 in Wehlen) was a German entomologist.

Märkel specialised in Coleoptera, especially Staphylinidae and studies of myrmecophily. He was a cantor in Wehlen.

== Works ==
partial list

- Märkel, J. C. F. 1845. Beitraege zur Kenntniss der unter Ameisen lebenden Insecten. Zeitschrift für die Entomologie 5 (1844): 193–271. Contributions to the knowledge of the insects living with ants.
