= Nikita Kokuyev =

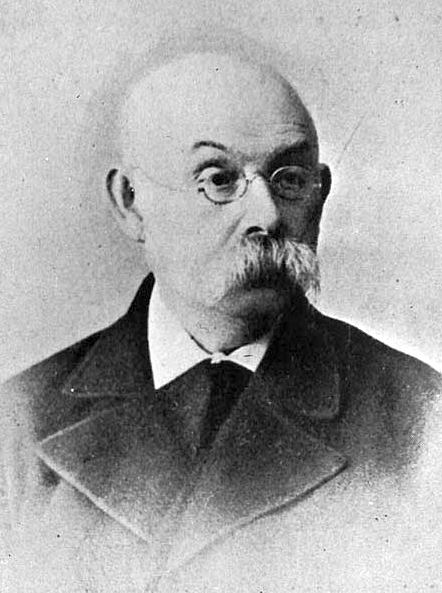
Nikita Rafailovich Kokuyev

Nikita Rafailovich Kokuyev (or Kokujev; Russian: Никита Рафаилович Кокуев; 28 October 1848, Maloarkhangelsk - 31 March 1914) was a Russian entomologist.

He specialized in Hymenoptera and Coleoptera and described new taxa in both groups. His collection is in the Zoological Museum of the Zoological Institute of the Russian Academy of Sciences

== Works ==
Partial list:

- Hymenoptera asiatica nova. Russkoe Entomologicheskoye Obozreniye. 3:285-288. (1903)
- Hymenoptera asiatica nova VI. Russkoe Entomologicheskoye Obozreniye. 5:10-15.(1905)
- Hymenoptera asiatica nova VII. Russkoe Entomologicheskoye Obozreniye. 5:208-210. (1905)
- Ichneumonidae (Hymenoptera) a clarissimis V.J. Roborovski et P.K. Kozlov annis 1894-1895 et 1900-1901 in China, Mongolia et Tibetia lecti. Ezhegodnik Zoologicheskago Muzeya. Annales du Musée Zoologique. Académie Impériale des Sciences. Saint-Pétersbourg 14:12-47. (1909)
- Duo Hemiptera [recte: Hymenoptera] nova faunae turanicae a J.V. Vasiljev collecta. Russkoe Entomologicheskoye Obozreniye. 12:407-408. (1912)
- Contribution à la faune des Hyménoptères de la Russie III. Revue Russe d'Entomologie. 13:161-170. (1913)
- Hymenoptera recueillies par V. Sovinskij sur les bords du lac Bajkal en 1902.(in Russian with Latin descriptions) Travaux de la Commission pour l'étude du lac Bajkal. 2:63-76. (1927)
