= Raniero Alliata di Pietratagliata =

Italian entomologist

Raniero Alliata di Pietratagliata or more correctly "of the Duchi di Pietratagliata" (Palermo, 9 June 1897 - 9 October 1979) was an Italian intellectual, theosophist and entomologist. His insect collection is conserved in the Museo d'Aumale, the regional museum in Terrasini. He lived in Villa Alliata di Pietratagliata in Palermo.
