= Eugène Benderitter =

French entomologist

Eugène Benderitter (17 November 1869, Rouen – 28 February 1940, Amiens) was a French entomologist who specialized in Coleoptera especially Scarabaeidae.

He described many new taxa mostly in the Bulletin de la Société Entomologique de France. His collections from Africa and Madagascar are in the Royal Museum for Central Africa.
