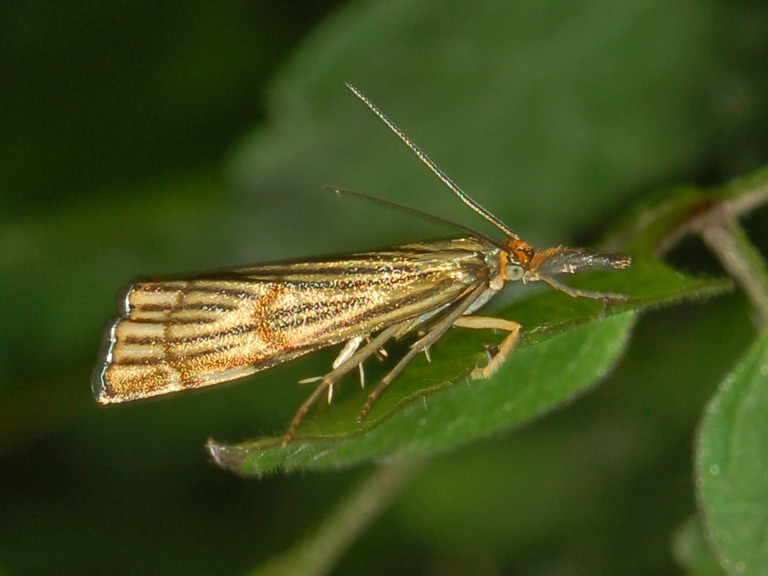

Scientific classification
- Kingdom: Animalia
- Phylum: Arthropoda
- Clade: Pancrustacea
- Class: Insecta
- Order: Lepidoptera
- Family: Crambidae
- Subfamily: Crambinae
- Tribe: Crambini
- Genus: Chrysocrambus
- Species: C. craterellus

Binomial name
- Chrysocrambus craterellus (Scopoli, 1763)

Synonyms
- Chrysocrambus craterella; Chrysocrambus craterella abruzzellus Bleszynski, 1958; Chrysocrambus abbruzzellus Bleszynski & Collins, 1962; Chrysocrambus craterellus var. alpinus Bleszynski, 1958; Crambus klimeschi Toll, 1938; Chrysocrambus craterella defessellus Toll, 1948); Chrysocrambus craterella libani Bleszynski, 1958; Phalaena Tinea rorella Linnaeus, 1767; Crambus craterella stachiellus Toll

= Chrysocrambus craterellus =

Species of moth

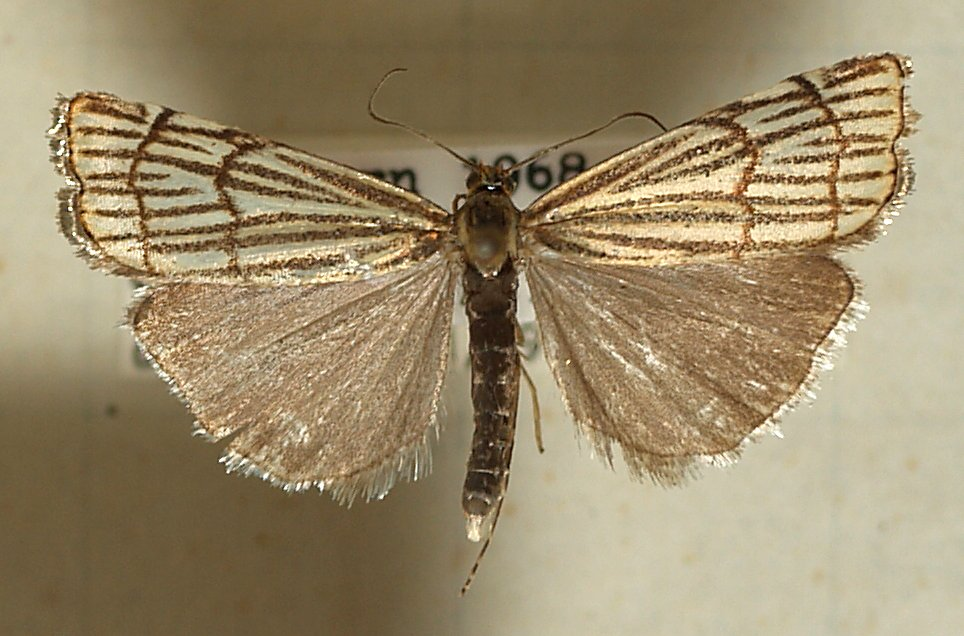
Mounted specimen

Chrysocrambus craterellus is a species of moth of the family Crambidae. It was first described by Giovanni Antonio Scopoli in his 1763 Entomologia Carniolica.

== Subspecies ==
- Chrysocrambus craterellus craterellus (Central and Southern Europe, Urals, Transcaucasus, Asia Minor)
- Chrysocrambus craterellus alpinus Bleszynski, 1958 (France)
- Chrysocrambus craterellus abruzzellus Bleszynski, 1958 (Abruzzi, Italy)
- Chrysocrambus craterellus stachiellus (Toll, 1938) (Podolia, Ukraine)
- Chrysocrambus craterellus libani Bleszynski, 1958 (Lebanon)
- Chrysocrambus craterellus defessellus (Toll, 1947) (Iran)

== Description ==
Chrysocrambus craterellus has a wingspan of about 20 mm. The moth flies from June to July depending on the location. The larvae feed on Festuca and other Gramineae species.

== Distribution and habitat ==
This species can be found in southern Europe and the Middle East. It prefers meadows, pastures and grasslands.
