= Carl Gustav Jablonsky =

German entomologist (1756–1787)

- Born: 1756
- Died: 1787 (aged 30–31)
- Scientific career
- Fields: Natural history, entomology

Carl Gustav Jablonsky (1756 – 25 May 1787) was a Berlin naturalist, entomologist and illustrator. He was also the private secretary to the Queen of Prussia, Elisabeth Christine of Brunswick-Wolfenbüttel-Bevern. He died at the age of 31. He willed his works to his colleague, Johann Friedrich Wilhelm Herbst, who became a naturalist and entomologist.

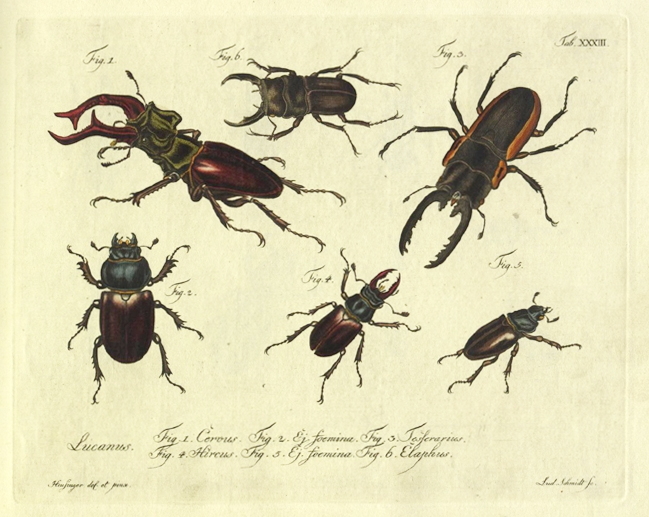
Plate from Natursystem aller bekannten in- und ausländischen Insecten

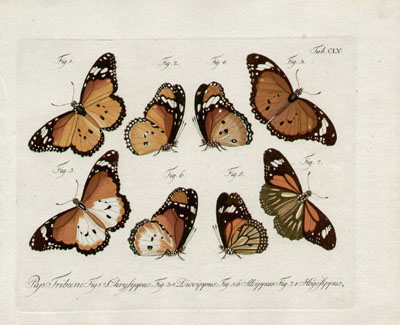
Plate from Natursystem aller bekannten in- und ausländischen Insecten

Jablonsky's Natursystem is one of the first attempts at a complete survey of the order Coleoptera.

== Works ==
With Johann Friedrich Wilhelm Herbst, Natursystem aller bekannten in- und ausländischen Insecten, als eine Fortzetsung der von Büffonschen Naturgeschichte. Nach dem System des Ritters Carl von Linné bearbeitet: Käfer
