= Friedrich Wilhelm Erdmann Clasen =

German entomologist

Friedrich Wilhelm Erdmann Clasen (29 October 1792, Hagenow – 2 May 1882, Rostok) was a German entomologist who specialized in Coleoptera.

Clasen was a teacher at the state school (Stadtschule) in Rostok.He was the author of Beitrage zur Kaeferfauna Mecklenburgs Abtlg. Osterprogr. Gr.Stadtschule zu Rostock (1845) and between 1853 and 1861 a number of other scientific paper on the beetles of Mecklenburg His collection is in the Zoological Institute Museum in Greifswald
