= Odorado Pirazzoli =

Italian army major and scientist (1815–1884)

Odorado Pirazzoli (6 April 1815 – 30 April 1884) was an Italian army major, engineer and entomologist. He was born in and, excepting his army career, lived in Imola. Pirazzoli was a coleopterist. His collection is in the Museo civico 'G. Scarabelli', Imola.
