= Rose Ella Warner =

American zoologist

Rose E. Warner
- Scientific career
- Fields: Entomology
- Workplaces: USDA

Rose Ella Warner was an American entomologist (more specifically a coleopterist) that worked at the Systematic Entomology Laboratory, United States Department of Agriculture where she researched beetles.
