= Gustav Stierlin =

Swiss physician and entomologist (1821–1907)

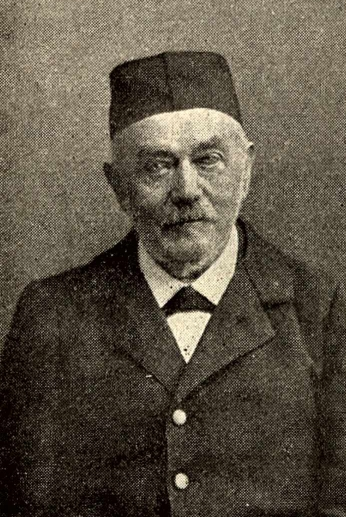

Wilhelm Gustav Stierlin (9 November 1821 – 28 March 1907) was a Swiss physician and entomologist. He specialized in the beetles and was a specialist on the European weevils of the genus Otiorhynchus.

== Life and work ==
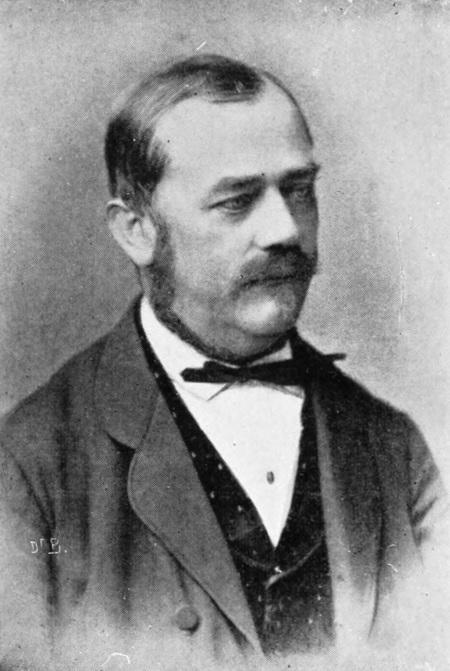

Stierlin was born in Schaffhausen, the son of George Michael and Mathilde Zogelmann. He studied medicine at Bonn from 1841 and graduated in 1845 after which he worked in Vienna and Paris. In 1847 he served as physician in the Sonderbund War and from 1850 he practiced in Schaffhausen as the district physician. He met Gustav Kraatz who inspired him into entomology. He made trips with others like Bischoff-Ehinger and Gautard to collect insects across Europe. From 1862 he edited the newsletter of the Swiss entomological society. He was the founding president of the Schaffhausen nature research society and directed the Schaffhausen natural history museum from 1878.

His major works included:

- Revision der europäischen Otiorhynchus-arten (1861)
- Käfer der Schweiz, Fauna coleopterorum helvetica - Volume 1 Volume 2 (1898-1900).
- Monographie des Otiorhynchides Volume 1 Volume 2 (with Georg Seidlitz and others, 1872)
