= Georges Meyer-Darcis =

Swiss botanist and entomologist (1860–1913)

- Born: Georg Gottlieb August Meyer; 12 September 1860; Wohlen, Switzerland
- Died: 3 January 1913 (aged 52); Florence, Kingdom of Italy (now Florence, Italy)
- Occupations: Businessman, botanist, entomologist

Georg Gottlieb August Meyer colloquially Georges Meyer-Darcis (12 September 1860 – 3 January 1913) was a Swiss businessman, botanist and entomologist.

== Early life and education ==
Meyer was born 12 September 1860 in Wohlen, Switzerland, to Georges Meyer and Müller, into an affluent Protestant family. His father was the proprietor of Socin & Meyer, a leading company in millinery manufacturing.

Between 1875 and 1878 he attended the technical department of the Old Cantonal School Aarau. Being encouraged by his professor Dr. Mühlberg, Meyer began collecting rare plants and insects with his peer at the school Samuel Döbeli.

== Career ==
After a commercial apprenticeship in Geneva, he managed the straw goods factory. In Geneva, he collected insects in his spare time, encouraged by the curator of the Entomological collections of the University of Geneva Dr. Emil Frey-Gessner (1826–1917).

In addition to his own collections, he purchased world Coleoptera and plant collections, including one by Johann Luzi Krättli (1812–1903), which he then presented to the Botanical Museum of the University of Zurich. Some parts of his beetle collection were sold to the French entomologist René Oberthür and are now preserved in the Muséum national d'Histoire naturelle, Paris.
