= Louis Beguin-Billecocq =

French diplomat and entomologist

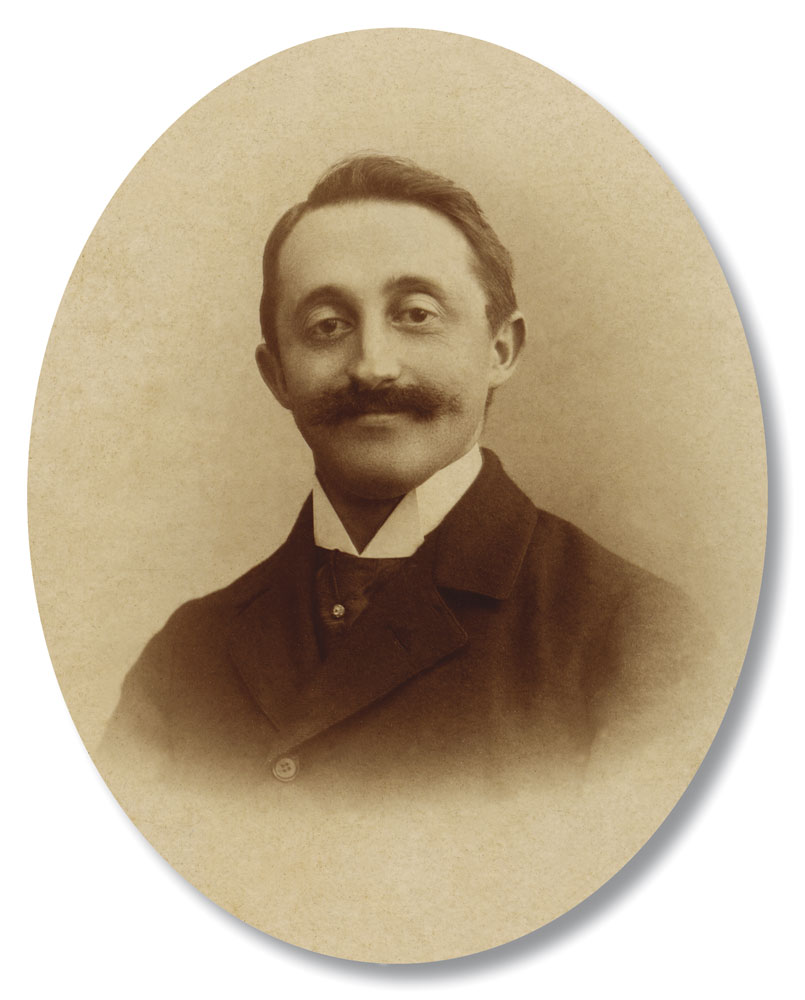
Louis Beguin-Billecocq

Louis Beguin-Billecocq (3 June 1865 – 1 April 1957) was a French diplomat and entomologist. He specialised in Coleoptera (beetles) and especially Curculionidae (the "true weevils"). He wrote Diagnoses d'espèces nouvelles d'Apionidae provenant de la région malgache d'Apionidae provenant de la région malgaque Annales de la Société Entomologique and Apions nouveaux de la République Argentine. Annales de la Société Entomologique de France. 78:449–464

He was born in Paris on 3 June 1865. He died in Nemours on 1 April 1857.
