= Nicolas Adolphe Bellevoye =

French artist, designer and entomologist

Nicolas Adolphe Bellevoye (9 April 1830, Metz- 29 November 1908, Reims) was a French artist, designer and entomologist. He wrote Pour L'étude De La Tératologie De Coléoptères Imp. Chaix Plaquette Paris 1907.

== Entomological works ==
- Catalogue des hémiptères du département de la Moselle, Metz, 1863
- Observations sur les Moeurs de plusieurs espèces de coléoptères vivant sur les plantes aquatiques, Metz, 1870
- Insectes qui vivent sur les tilleuls de l'Esplanade de Metz et insectes nouveaux ou rares des environs de Metz, Metz, 1870
- Mœurs des anthrénus qui vivent aux environs de Metz, Metz, 1878
- Observations sur la chaiicodoma, le magaphilus centeucularis et l'osmia biscornis aux environs de Metz, Metz, 1884
- Contributions à la tératologie entomologique, 1887
- Etude sur la fourmi domestique, monomorium pharaonis Latrille, avec planche dessinée et gravée par lui-même, Reims, 1891
- Catalogue des orthoptères des environs de Reims, Reims, 1893
- Excursion sur les promenades de Reims et visite des arbres attaqués par des insectes, 1893
- Observations sur les hoemonia dans la Marne et la Moselle, avec planche dessinée et gravée par l'auteur, Reims, 1895
- Les plantations de pins dans la Marne et les parasites qui les attaquent en collaboration avec J Laurent, Reims, typographie et lithographie de l'Indépendant rémois, 1897
- Etudes sur les moeurs de Xyleborns Dispar, Fabr. et Saxeseni Ratz, Reims, 1899
- Supplément au catalogue des orthoptères des environs de Reims, Reims, 1901
- Les variétés de l'Hélix pomatia, Reims, 1904
- Les insectes des saules Encyclopédie des saules, par G de La Barre, 1904
- La Pyrale de la vigne, le ver coquin et les noctuelles en Champagne, Reims, 1905
- Insectes nuisibles dans la ville de Reims; la Galéruque de l'Orme, Reims, 1906
- Documents pour l'étude de la tératologie des coléoptères, Paris, imprimerie Chaix, 1908
- Observations sur le Rostellaria Geoffroyi, Watt, 1908

== Sources and bibliography ==
1. Nérée Quépat Dictionnaire biographique de l'ancien département de la Moselle, Paris, Picard, 1887
2. Dictionnaire biographique de la Marne'', 1907
3. Louis Demaison Notice sur M.Ad Bellevoye, Reims, Typographie et lithographie de l'Indépendant rémois, 1909
4. Eugène Colon Notice sur M Nicolas-Adolphe Bellevoye, dans les Mémoires de l'Académie nationale de Metz, 1911
5. Elie Fleur Notice biographique sur M.AD-N Bellevoye, Metz, imprimerie Paul Even, 1913
