= Johann Müller-Rutz =

Swiss entomologist (1854–1944)

Johann Müller-Rutz (28 February 1854, Räuchlisberg – 7 May 1944, St. Gallen) was a Swiss entomologist who specialised in the study of microlepidoptera, small moths. He trained as an embroidery artist and worked in first in Müllheim (1885-1888) and then in St. Gallen where he was teacher of embroidery designs at the Industrial and Trade Centre St. Gallen.

Johann Müller-Rutz published fauna studies, revisions and descriptions of new species in Mitteilungen der Schweizerischen Entomologischen Gesellschaft. Together with Karl Vorbrodt he wrote Die Schmetterlinge der Schweiz (Butterflies of Switzerland) Bern K.J. Wyss, 1911-1914. His collection of Palearctic Lepidoptera is divided between the Natural History Museum of Basel and the Natural History Museum of Bern. It is rich in specimens from the Canton of Thurgau, the Alpstein and the Alps.
