= Gustav Jäger (naturalist) =

German naturalist and hygienist

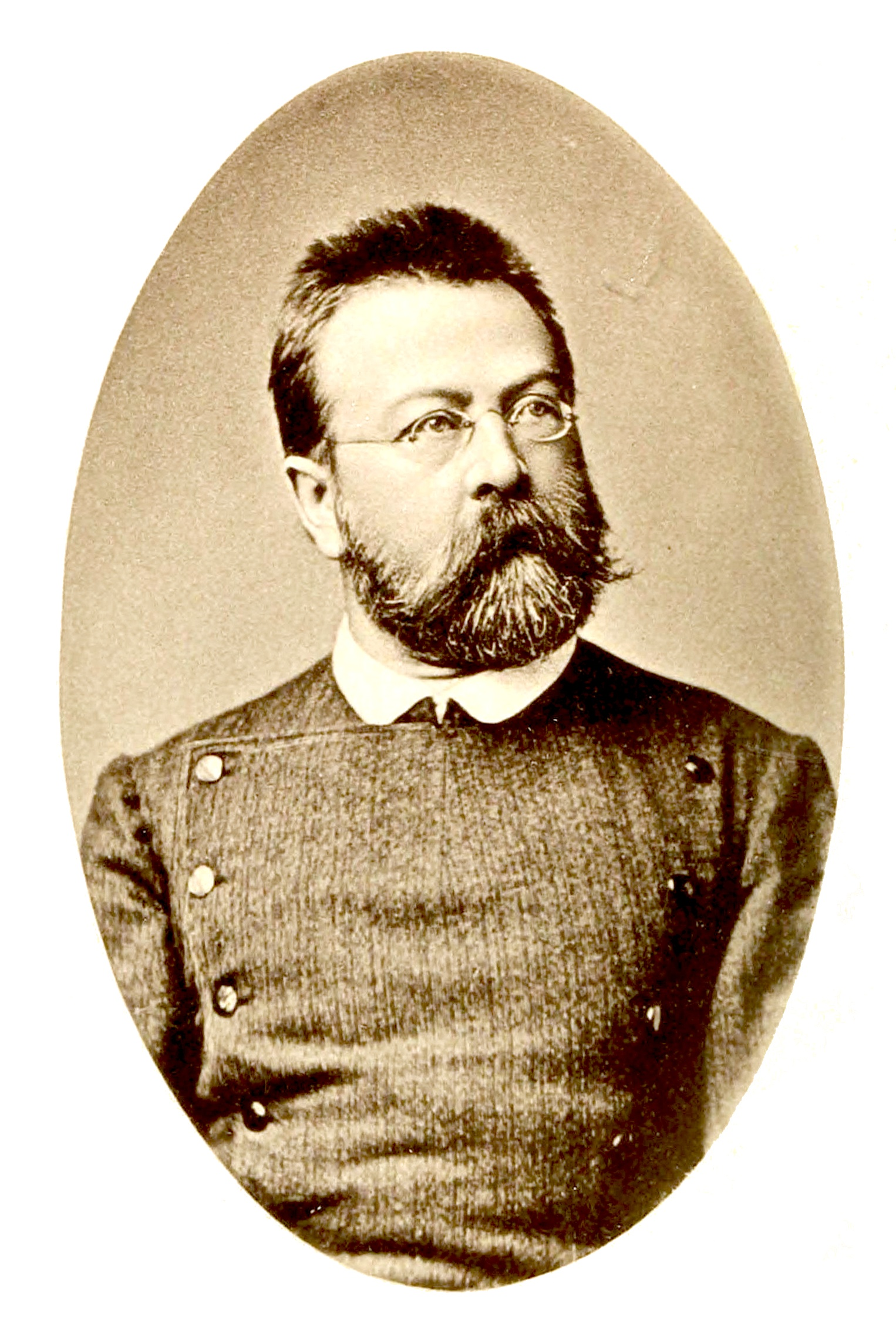
- Gustav Jäger in 1884, wearing his woolen Normalkleidung
- Born: June 23, 1832; Bürg, Neuenstadt am Kocher, Germany
- Died: May 13, 1917 (aged 84); Stuttgart, Germany
- Scientific career
- Fields: biology, entomology, hygiene

Gustav Jäger (June 23, 1832 – May 13, 1917) was a German physician, naturalist and hygienist. He was a professor of zoology and physiology at the Stuttgart veterinary medicine school and at the Stuttgart Polytechnic. In his writings and teachings he advocated various measures for what he considered as healthy clothing and lifestyle. He promoted the use of woolen clothes that he termed as "normal clothing" which he claimed were the closest to natural animal covering and allowed the "soul" made of chemical constituents from the body to release some of the harmful portions which one could detect in the form of fragrances.

== Biography ==
Jäger was the son of pastor Karl Friedrich (1794–1842) and Ulrike (1795–1881) daughter of pastor Gottlob Friedrich Stang. He was born at the historic Pfarrhaus in the village of Bürg, Neuenstadt am Kocher in Württemberg. He was expected to follow the family profession and studied theology at the seminary in Urach but quit it to study medicine and natural sciences at Tübingen. He received a doctorate and became a teacher of zoology in Vienna. He studied zoology and comparative anatomy at Vienna University in 1858. In 1860 he married Selma (1839–1907), daughter of a pastor and they had three sons and three daughters. He worked at a zoological garden in Vienna and became its director until 1866. In 1868, he was appointed professor of zoology at the academy of Hohenheim, and in 1870 he became teacher of zoology and anthropology at Stuttgart Polytechnic and professor of physiology at the Veterinary School. In 1884, he abandoned teaching and started practice as a physician in Stuttgart. After the death of his first wife in 1907, he married Helene Müller, daughter of a pharmacist.

He wrote various works on biological subjects, including Die Darwinsche Theorie und ihre Stellung zu Moral und Religion (1869), and Lehrbuch der allgemeinen Zoologie (1871–1878). Jäger was an early supporter of Darwinism, sending Darwin a special album in 1877 along with other German evolutionists.

In 1876, he suggested a hypothesis in explanation of heredity, resembling the germ plasm theory subsequently elaborated by August Weismann, to the effect that the germinal protoplasm retains its specific properties from generation to generation, dividing in each reproduction into an ontogenetic portion, out of which the individual is built up, and a phylogenetic portion, which is reserved to form the reproductive material of the mature offspring.

In Die Entdeckung der Seele ("The Discovery of The Soul", 1878), Jäger claimed that the human breath could reveal, the race, and the health condition and that the human nose was capable of detecting this. He considered sweating as a healing process. He advanced the first crude version of the pheromone concept. His postulated skin, "anthropines," popularly dubbed as "lust compounds," came astoundingly close to reality but the idea was too far ahead of the possibilities of chemistry and the life sciences at this time to be corroborated by experiments.

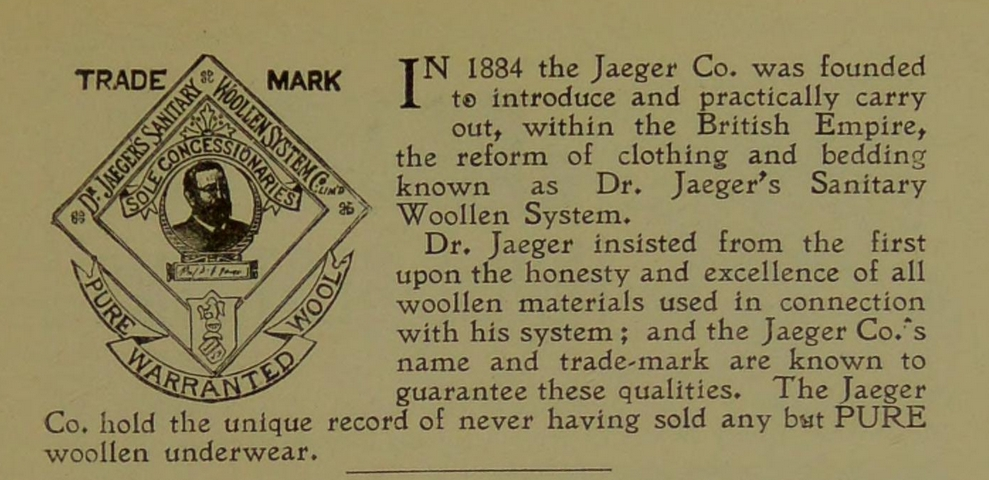

The system of clothing associated with his name originates from Die Normalkleidung als Gesundheitsschutz ("Standardized Apparel For Health Protection" (1880)), wherein he advocated the wearing of rough fabrics, such as wool, "close to the skin," objecting especially to the use of any kind of plant fibre. The teachings of Jäger inspired the creation of the Jaeger clothing brand. His normal clothing was adopted by the Arctic explorer Fridtjof Nansen, who often gave talks around the world dressed in it, leading to its widespread promotion in Europe.

In 1881, he founded his own magazine devoted to spreading his idea about health reform (Prof. Dr. G. Jägers Monatsblatt). Jäger gave lectures on his ideas and this led to the formation of associations that followed his ideas. There were fifteen in 1884, thirty by 1887 with nearly 900 members. An English translation of his book "Essays on Health-Culture" (1887) sold five million copies in England.

He also was a very active entomologist specialising in beetles particularly Buprestidae and Scarabaeidae. He wrote with Carl Gustav Calwer Käferbuch-Naturgeschichte der Käfer Europas (Beetle Book: Natural History of Europe's Beetles). This very popular work was successively reprinted until 1916. His beetle collection is in the Stuttgart Natural History Museum.
