= Arthur Riky Hogan =

Arthur Riky Hogan (23 May 1832 – 15 October 1880) was an Irish clergyman and entomologist from Dublin.

Hogan, who gained his M.A. at the University of Dublin, was the curate of Corsham, from 1856 to 1858, curate of Piddleton, Dorset, from 1860 to 1863, then, after 1865, Vicar of Watlington, Oxfordshire. He was one of the editors of the Natural History Review (the others were William Henry Harvey, Samuel Haughton, Alexander Henry Haliday and Edward Percival Wright). Hogan spent his last years in Italy with Haliday.

He was an Honorary Member of the Oxford Entomological Society. He died in Southport, Lancashire, aged 48.

== Works ==
Partial list

- A. R. Hogan. 1854. Catalogue of Coleoptera found in the neighbourhood of Dublin. Zoologist 12: 4195-4338
- A. R. Hogan & A. H. Haliday. 1855 Notes on various insects captured or observed in the neighbourhood of Dingle, Co. Kerry, in July, 1854. Natural History Review 2: 50-55
- A. R. Hogan. 1855. Catalogue of the Irish Microlepidoptera. Natural History Review 2: 109-115
