= Carl Gustav Calwer =

German entomologist (1821-1874)

Carl Gustav Calwer (11 November 1821 in Stuttgart – 19 August 1874 in Mineralbad Berg) was a German entomologist who specialised in Coleoptera.

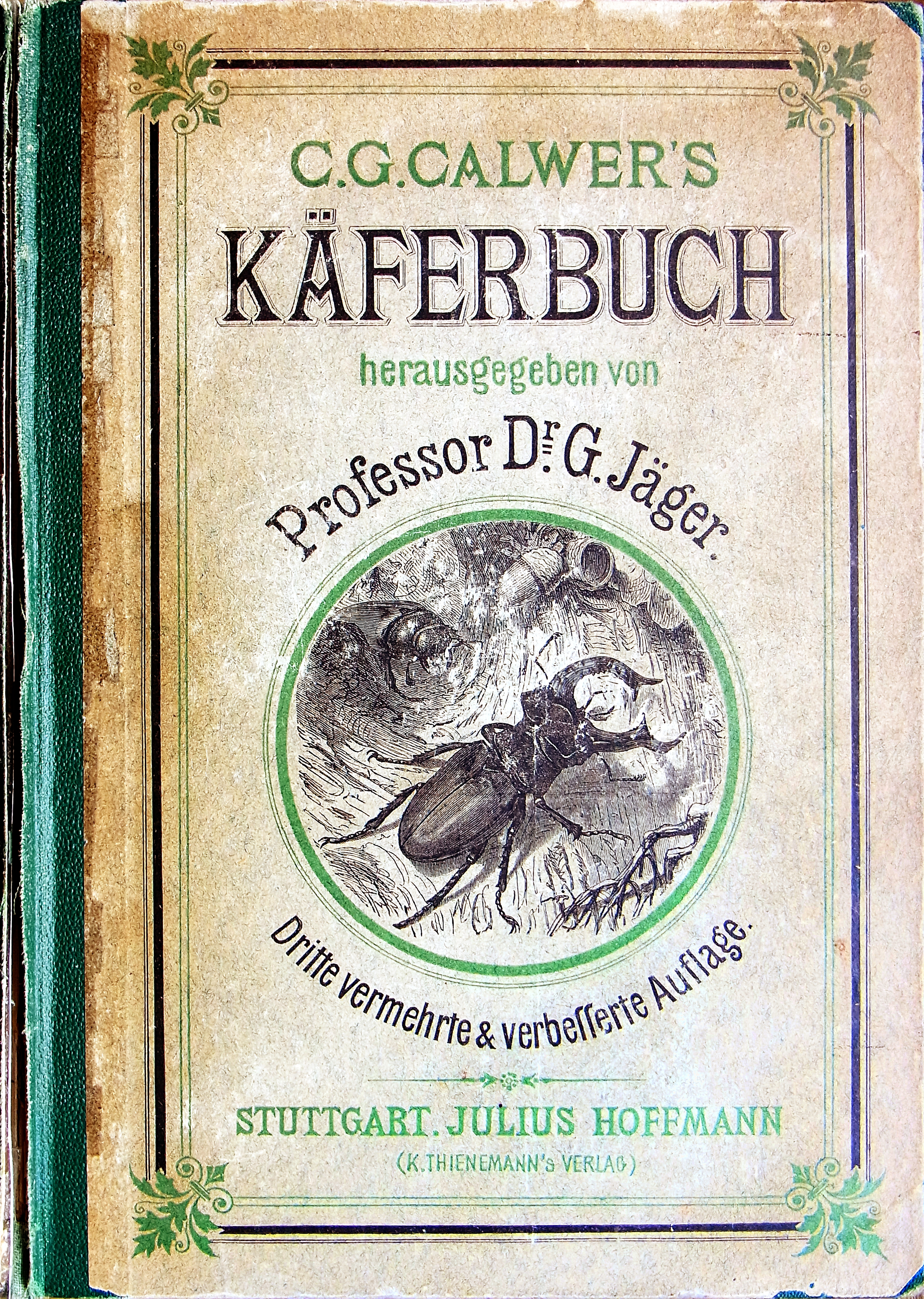
Calwers Käferbuch

He wrote initially with the Stuttgart professor Dr Gustav Jäger Käferbuch, Naturgeschichte der Käfer Europas published by Julius Hoffmann, Stuttgart a 666-page work with 50 lithographic plates all but two in colour. This very popular work was successively reprinted until 1916. Many of the fine plates were reused in Georgij Georgiewitsch Jacobson's 1905 Beetles of Russia, enabling Jacobson to focus on illustrating previously undescribed species.
