= Eduard Knirsch =

Eduard Knirsch (1869 – 23 November 1955 in Vienna) was an Austrian doctor/dentist and entomologist who specialised in Coleoptera. His collection is in Museum Victoria, Australia and the Field Museum in Chicago.

He published Beiträge zur Kenntnis der Insektenfauna Deutsch-Ostafrikas, insbesondere des Matengo-Hochlandes (Contributions to the knowledge of insect-fauna of German East Africa, in particular the Matengo Highlands), based on collections of Hans Zerny (VIII, Coleóptera: 2. Scarabaeidae, subf. Cetoniinae).
