= Johann Friedrich Wilhelm Herbst =

German naturalist and entomologist (1743–1807)

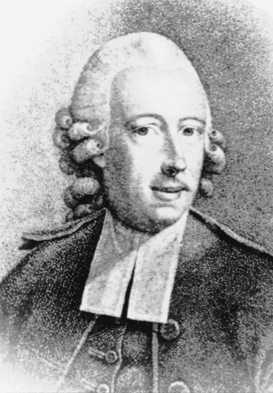
Johann Friedrich Wilhelm Herbst

Johann Friedrich Wilhelm Herbst (1 November 1743 – 5 November 1807) was a German naturalist and entomologist from Petershagen, Minden-Ravensberg. He served as a chaplain in the Prussian army. His marriage in Berlin, 1770, with Euphrosyne Luise Sophie (1742–1805), daughter of the Prussian Hofrat Libert Waldschmidt, seems to have been childless.

He was the joint editor, with Carl Gustav Jablonsky, of Naturgeschichte der in- und ausländischen Insekten (1785–1806, 10 volumes), which was one of the first attempts at a complete survey of the order Coleoptera. Herbst's Naturgeschichte der Krabben und Krebse, released in installments, was the first full survey of crustaceans.

Herbst's other works included Anleitung zur Kenntnis der Insekten (1784–86, 3 volumes), Naturgeschichte der Krabben und Krebse (1782–1804, 3 volumes), Einleitung zur Kenntnis der Würmer (1787–88, 2 volumes), and Natursystem der ungeflügelten Insekten (Classification of the unwinged insects) (1797–1800, 4 parts).
