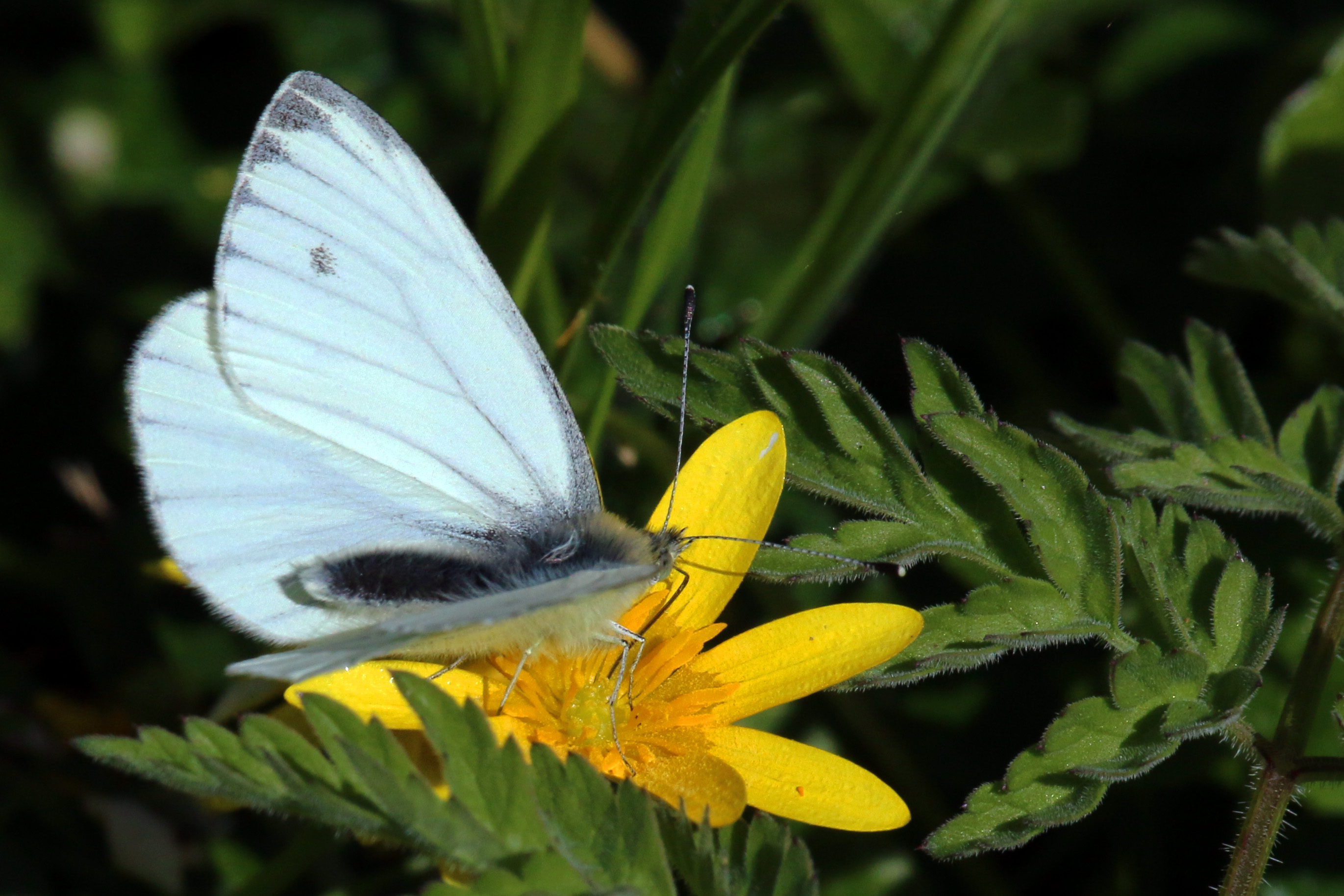

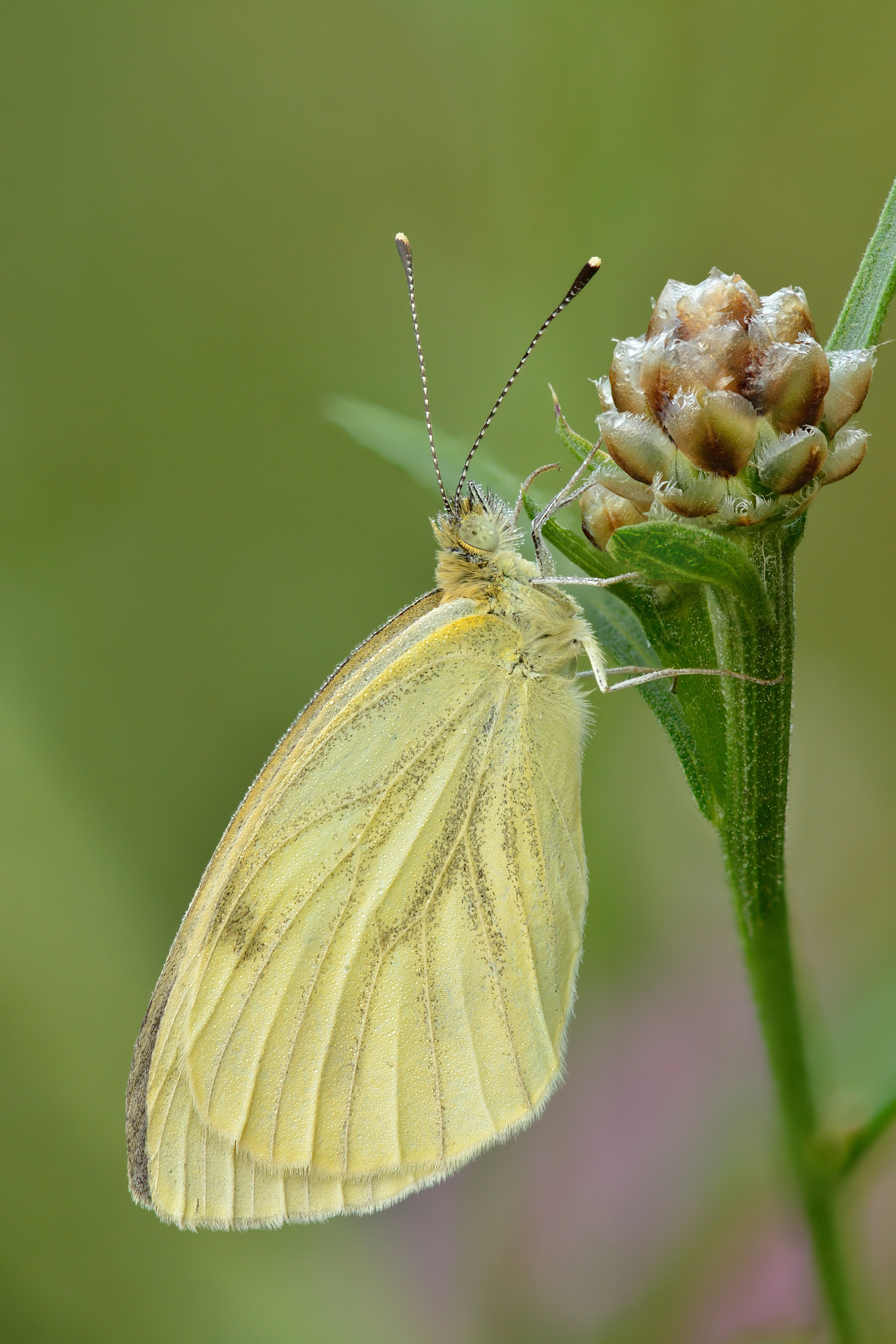

Scientific classification
- Kingdom: Animalia
- Phylum: Arthropoda
- Clade: Pancrustacea
- Class: Insecta
- Order: Lepidoptera
- Family: Pieridae
- Genus: Pieris
- Species: P. napi

Binomial name
- Pieris napi (Linnaeus, 1758)

= Green-veined white =

Species of butterfly

The green-veined white (Pieris napi) is a butterfly of the family Pieridae.

== Appearance and distribution ==
A circumboreal species widespread across Europe and Asia, including the Indian subcontinent, Japan, the Maghreb and North America. It is found in meadows, hedgerows and woodland glades but not as often in gardens and parks like its close relatives the large and small whites, for which it is often mistaken. Like other "white" butterflies, the sexes differ. The female has two spots on each forewing, the male only one. The veins on the wings of the female are usually more heavily marked. The underside hindwings are pale yellow with the veins highlighted by black scales giving a greenish tint, hence green-veined white. Unlike the large and small whites, it rarely chooses garden cabbages to lay its eggs on, preferring wild crucifers. Males emit a sex pheromone that is perceptible to humans, citral, the basic flavor-imparting component of lemon peel oil.

Some authors consider the mustard white and West Virginia white of North America to be conspecific with P. napi or consider P. napi to be a superspecies. Despite this, the American butterflies, unlike P. napi, cannot successfully use garlic mustard as a host plant. Females will lay eggs on it, mistaking this non-native species for a compatible native mustard, resulting in the death of the offspring. Classification is also an issue concerning the European dark-veined white.

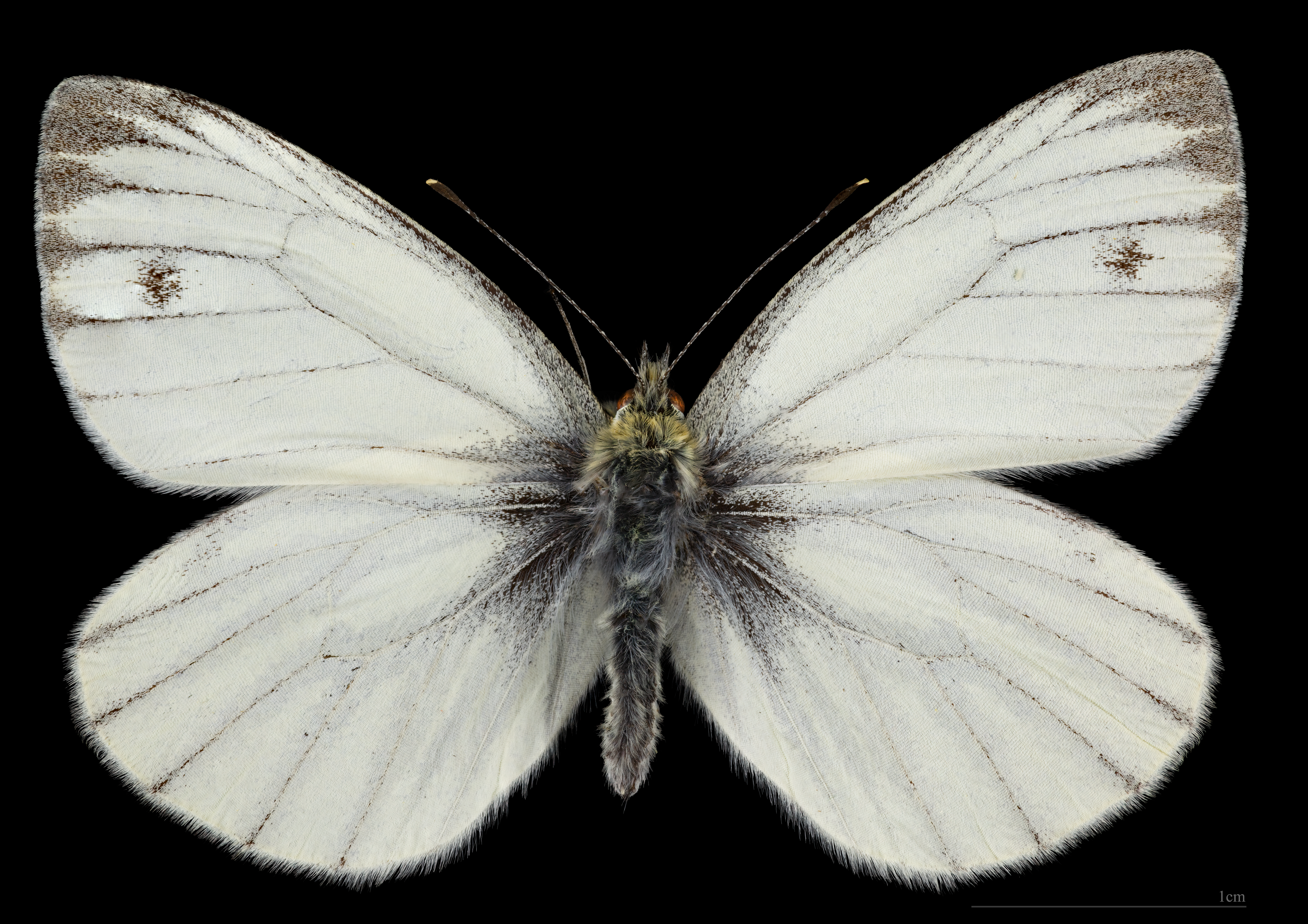
Pieris napi ♂

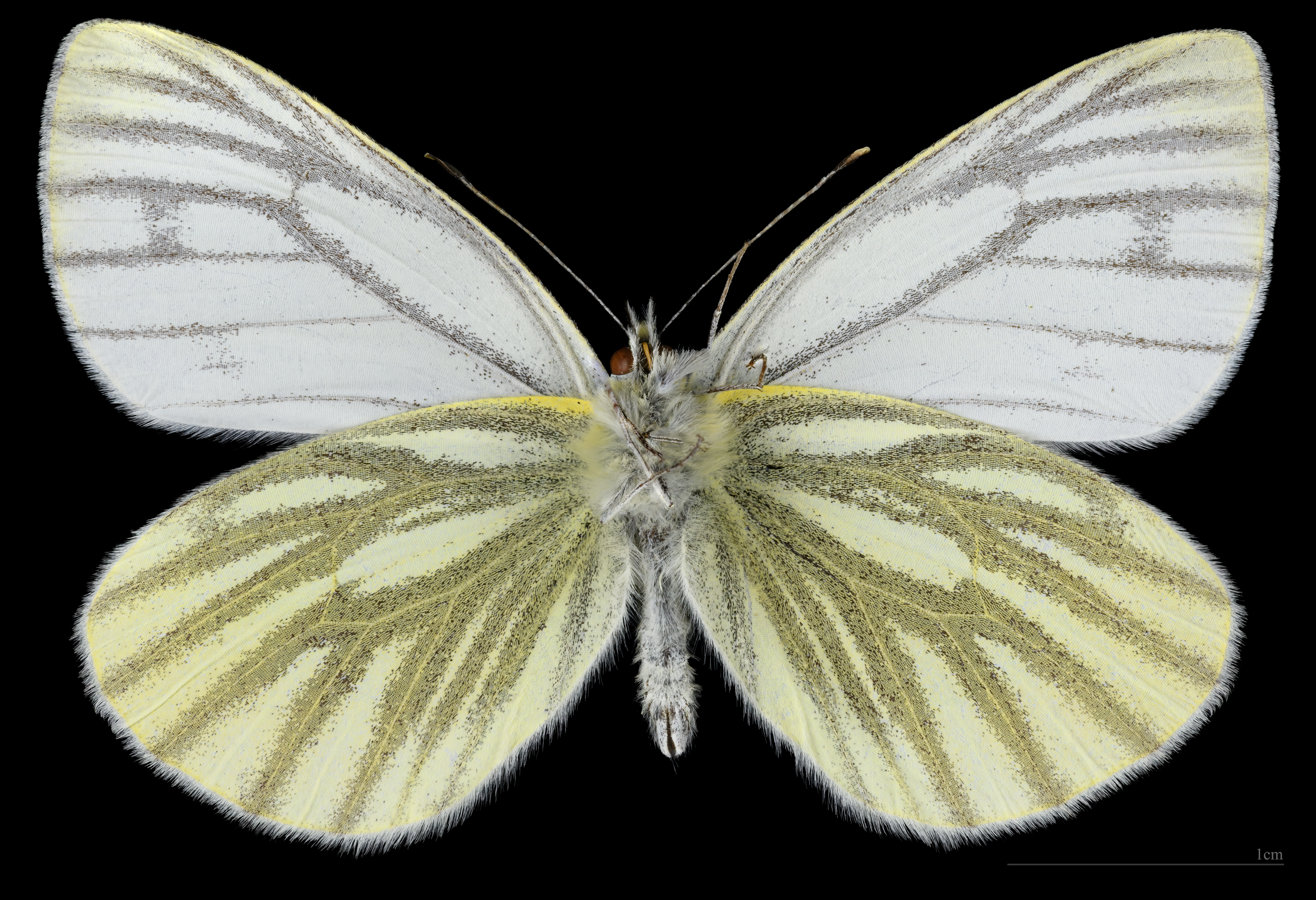
Pieris napi ♂ △

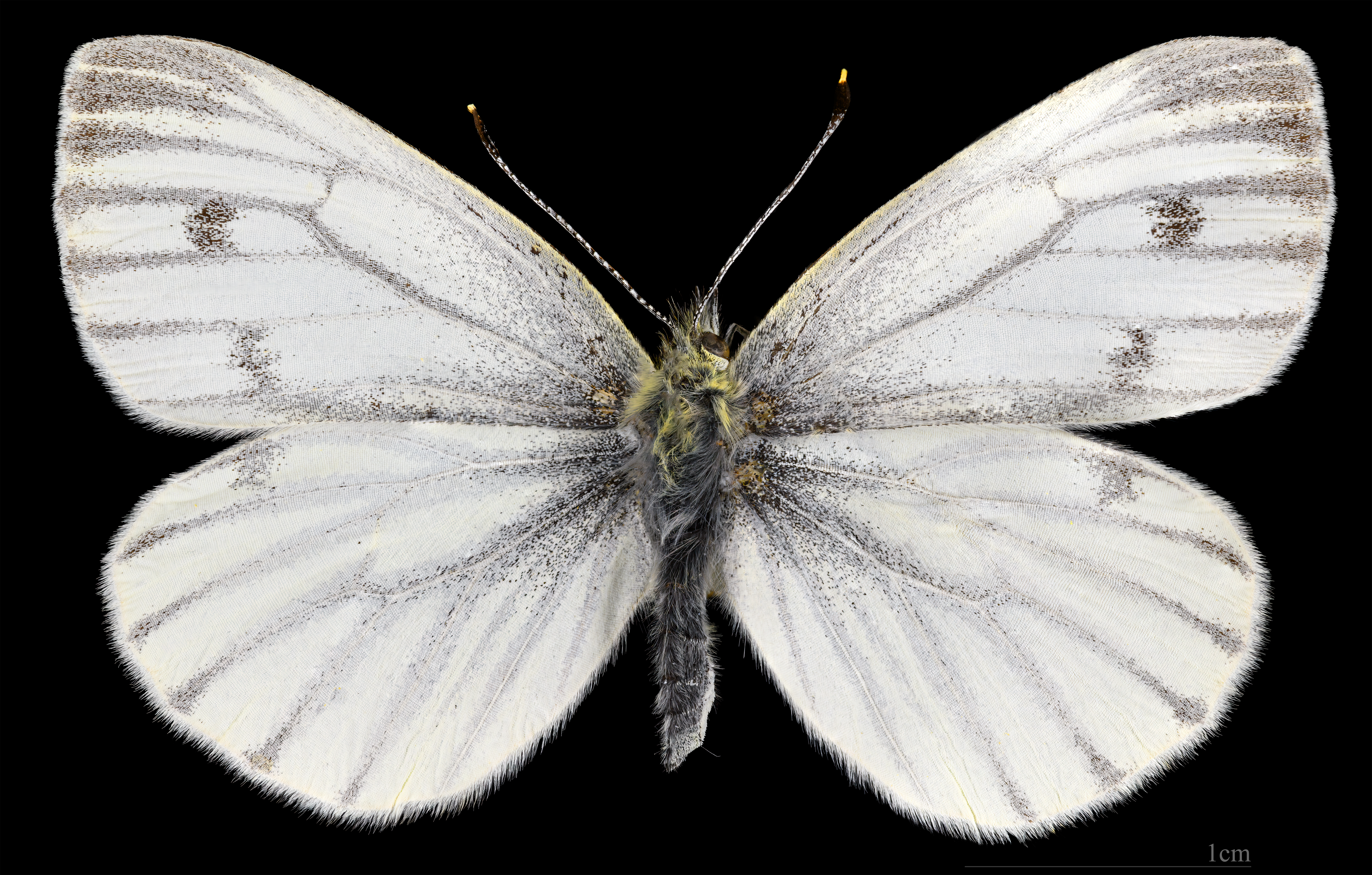
Pieris napi ♀

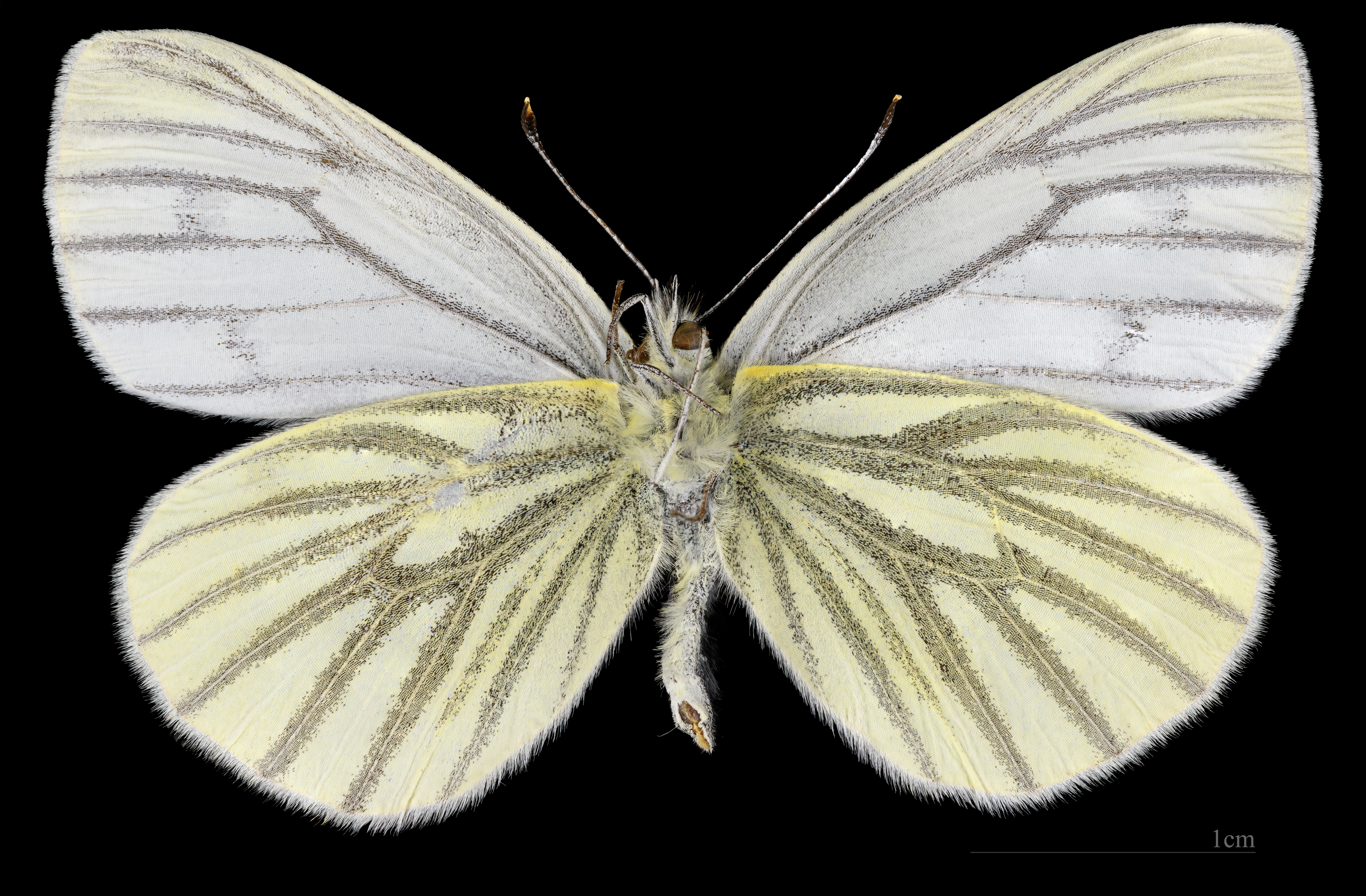
Pieris napi ♀ △

== Life cycle and food plants ==
The eggs are laid singly on a wide range of food plants including hedge mustard (Sisymbrium officinale), garlic mustard (Alliaria petiolata), cuckooflower (Cardamine pratense), water-cress (Rorippa nastutium-aquaticum), charlock (Sinapis arvensis), large bitter-cress (Cardamine amara), wild cabbage (Brassica oleracea), and wild radish (Raphanus raphanistrum), and so it is rarely a pest in gardens or field crops. The caterpillar is green and well camouflaged. When full grown it is green above with black warts, from which arise whitish and blackish hairs. There is a darker line along the back and a yellow line low down on the sides. Underneath the colour is whitish-grey. The spiracular line is dusky but not conspicuous, and the spiracles are blackish surrounded with yellow. There is extensive overlap with other leaf-feeding larvae of large and small whites in some wild populations (e.g. in Morocco). It is often found feeding on the same plant as the orange tip but rarely competes for food because it usually feeds on the leaves whereas the orange tip caterpillar feeds on the flowers and developing seed pods. Like other Pieris species it overwinters as a pupa. This is green in colour, and the raised parts are yellowish and brown. This is the most frequent form, but it varies through yellowish to buff or greyish, and is sometimes without markings.

== Habitat ==
Pieris napi habitat

P. napi is found in damp, grassy places with some shade, forest edges, hedgerows, meadows and wooded river valleys. The later generations widen their habitat use in the search for alternative food plants in drier, but flowery places. In the Mediterranean the insect is also found in scrub around mountain streams or springs and on floodplains with Nasturtium officinale. It is found from sea level to high elevations (2500 m in central Europe, 2600 m in Italy, 3600 m in Morocco).

== Flight times ==
The generations vary with location, elevation and season. In northern Europe there are two or three generations from April to early September. In warmer areas and in some good years there is a fourth generation. In southern Europe there are three or more partially overlapping generations from March to October.

== Seasonal variation ==
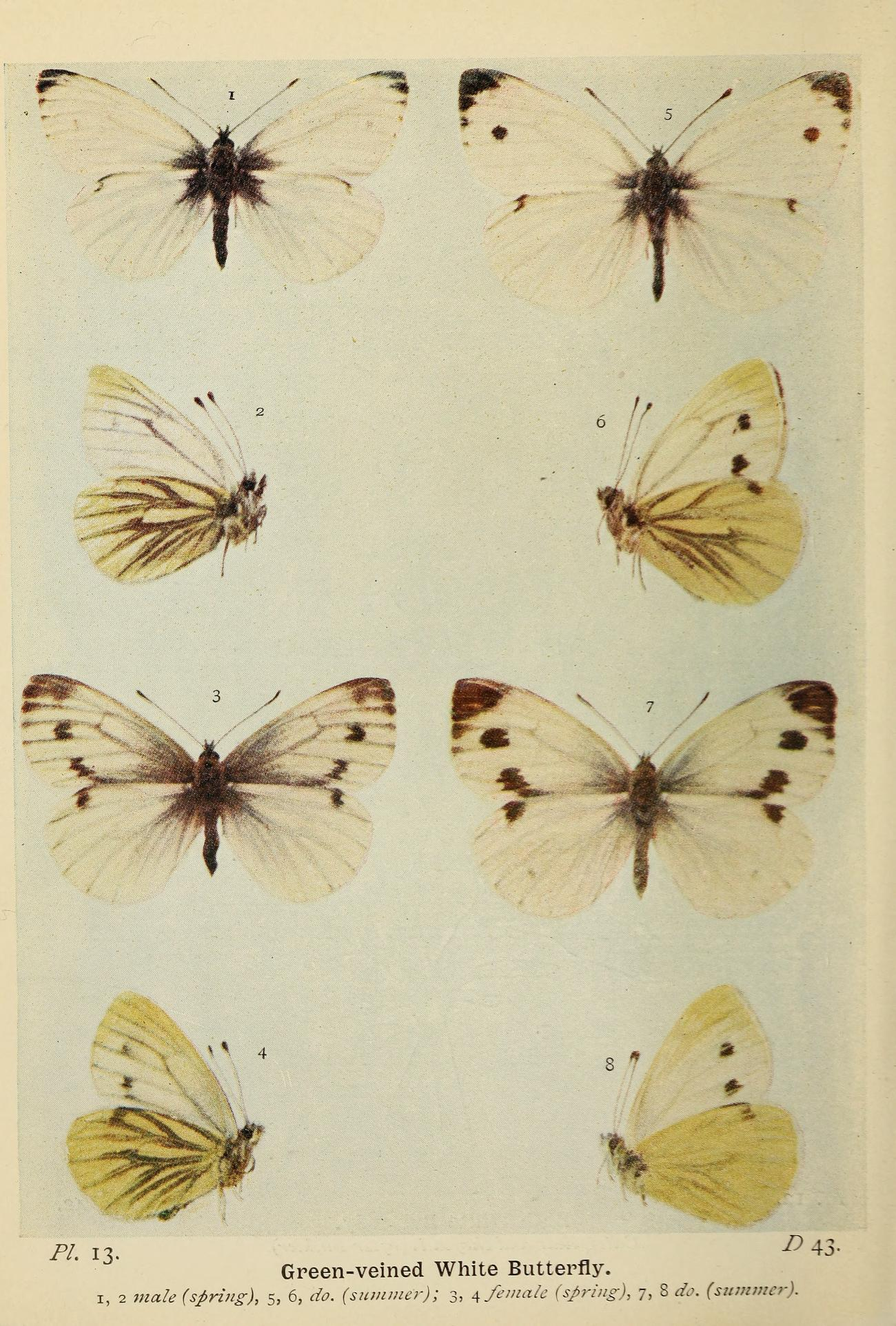
Plate 13 from The Butterflies of the British Isles by Richard South

In Great Britain, April, May and June specimens have the veins tinged with grey and rather distinct, but are not so strongly marked with black as those belonging to the second flight, which occurs in late July and throughout August. This seasonal variation, as it is called, is also most clearly exhibited on the underside. In the May and June butterfly (plate 13, left side) the veins below are greenish grey, and those of the hindwings are broadly bordered also with this colour. In the bulk of the July and August specimens (plate 13, right side) only the nervures are shaded with greenish grey, and the nervures are only faintly, or not at all, marked with this colour. Now and then a specimen of the first brood may assume the characters properly belonging to the specimens of the second brood; and, on the other hand, a butterfly of the second brood may closely resemble one of the first brood. As a rule, however, the seasonal differences referred to are fairly constant. By rearing this species from the egg it has been ascertained that part (sometimes the smaller) of a brood from eggs laid in June attains the butterfly stage the same year, and the other part remains in the chrysalis until the following spring, the butterflies in each set being of the form proper to the time of emergence.

== Other variation ==
In the typical form -forma typica- the forewings are creamy-white, irrorated with black towards the base. There is an apical blackish blotch, sometimes broken into several terminal spots; and a black spot between 3 and 4 (in male sometimes absent) In the female there is a black subdorsal posterior spot, and a dorsal confluent mark. The hindwings are creamy-white, the base black-sprinkled and a black costal spot before the apex (in male sometimes absent). The underside of the hindwings and underside apex of the forewings is pale yellow the veins edged with a shading of fine black lines, in the hindwings more broadly.

The ground colour varies from white to cream, sulphur-yellow, chrome yellow and light hues of buff or brown. The spot markings also vary and may be joined or absent. The vein shading varies in colour and in intensity and the shaded bands may be broad or narrow.

Variants, many named, are described by Röber (Europe), Langham (Ireland) and Anon (Britain)

== Behaviour ==
=== Senses ===
Recent research has shown that when males mate with a female, they inject methyl salicylate along with their sperm. The smell of this compound repels other males, thus ensuring the first male's paternity of the eggs—a form of chemical mate guarding.

After a female mates, she will display a mate refusal posture that releases methyl salicylate during a subsequent courtship. The release of this anti-aphrodisiac will quickly terminate the courtship. Males are very sensitive to differences in methyl salicylate levels, and will use this sense to influence their mating behaviour. However, a virgin female displaying a very similar posture will release a different chemical that will prolong the courtship ritual. Males are sensitive to these chemical and postural differences, and can discriminate between a receptive virgin female and an unreceptive mated female.

The adult male of this species has a distinctive odour that resembles lemon verbena. This smell is associated with specialized androconial scales on male wings.

=== Mating system ===
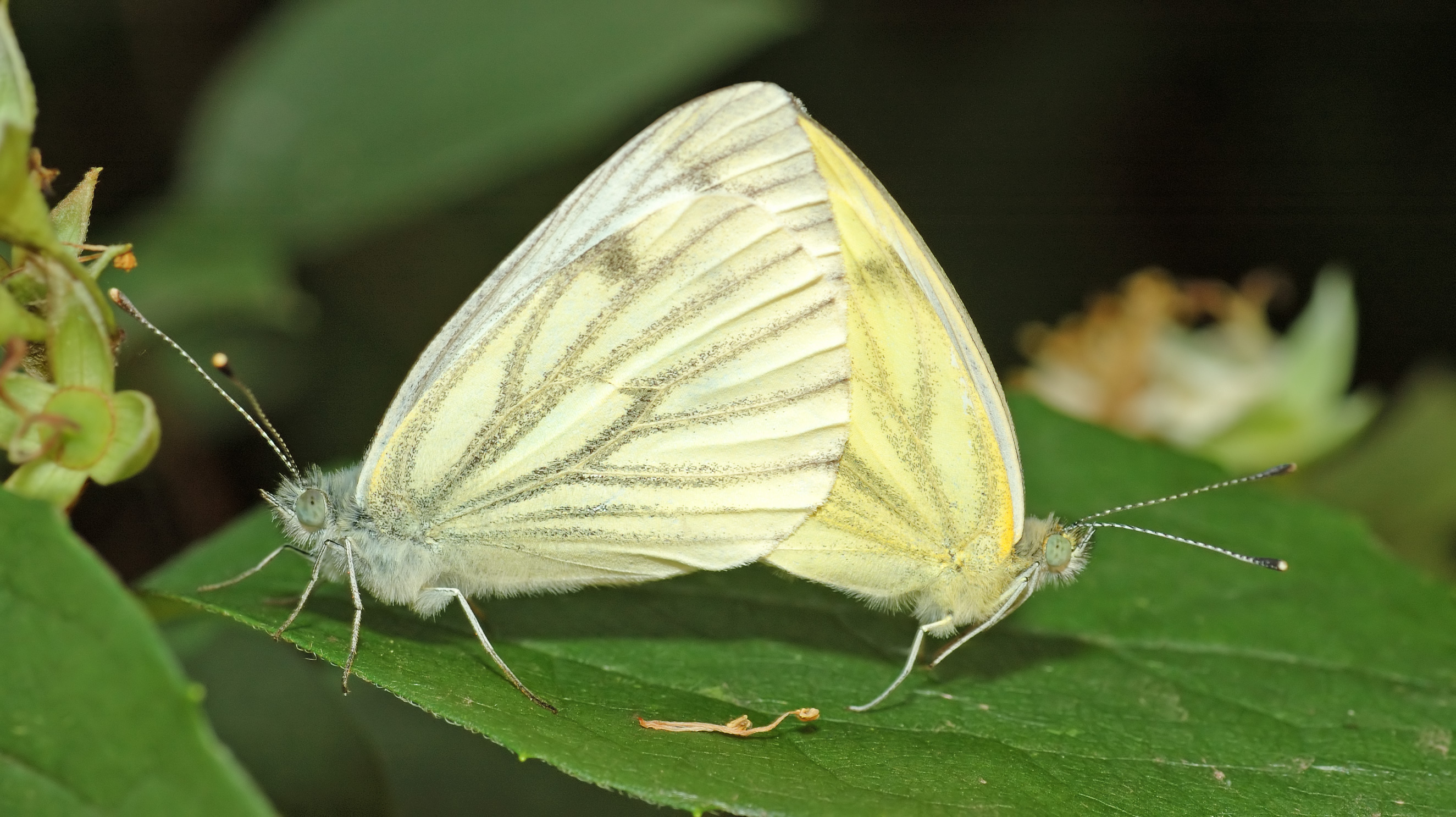
Mating Pieris napi

In the usually polyandrous P. napi, females who mate multiple times have higher lifetime fecundity, lay larger eggs, and live longer compared to females who mate only once. In most organisms it is the female who contributes the most to the reproduction of offspring as she must invest an egg and then carry the zygote. Males, on the other hand, need only provide a sperm that is of low cost. In P. napi, however, mating is unusually costly to males as the ejaculate matter produced contains not only sperm but accessory substances as well. These substances average 15% of male body mass and are incorporated into female soma and reproductive tissues during the mating process. Therefore, the nuptial gift given by P. napi males qualifies both as paternal investment and mating effort. Despite the presence of nuptial gifts and the known benefits to females and offspring, some females are still monogamous. There are multiple reasons in why other species are monogamous like access to males, low sperm population, and age. Some P. napi are likely monogamous due to variation in egg production between polygamous and monogamous females. Polygamous females rely on male mates in order to increase their reproductive output, but polygamous females that only mate twice may not have as high of reproductive output as monogamous females do. This system is unlike other types of butterflies such as Pararge aegeria, where female reproductive effort is independent of male ejaculate.

The amount of ejaculate of virgin males during mating is larger than that of non-virgin males. Females therefore must mate more frequently with non-virgin males in order to obtain the necessary amount of male-derived nutrition.

=== Sexual cooperation and conflict ===
In P. napi, the nuptial gift is an example of sexual cooperation towards a common interest of both males and females. The existence of nutrients in the ejaculate is beneficial to the females because it increases female fecundity and longevity, and eventually promotes re-mating. The existence of the anti-aphrodisiac, methyl salicylate, is effective in reducing female harassment by other males.

However, the transfer of this ejaculate can cause a conflict over re-mating due to sperm competition. After a female mates, infertile sperm ejaculated by the male will fill the female's sperm storage organ and prevent her from mating. The amount of infertile sperm stored is correlated with the refractory period of a female after mating. Infertile sperm makes up 90% of the sperm count, showing that males manipulate females by preventing them from mating with another male for a certain period of time. Although polyandry benefits females of P. napi by maximizing the amount of transferred nutrients from the male, the infertile sperm storage prolongs female re-mating.

This refractory period makes it harder for females to mate, and females will continue to have difficulty as their age and mating frequency increase. Males who have recently copulated will not transfer as many nutrients to their next mate, but will spend a longer duration of time for each mating. This increases the mating costs for females because they are spending more time copulating and receiving fewer nutrients from the ejaculate. Males take advantage of this because females do not reduce their mating costs by copulating with virgin males. In addition, males will transfer the most methyl salicylate to their first mate to ensure its paternity. However, a female who mates with a virgin male will have the most difficulty re-mating, therefore delaying her from engaging in the preferred polyandry. Males tailor their ejaculate in the sense that the first ejaculate is meant to prolong the refractory period of the female, and every subsequent ejaculate is meant to maximize efficiency in sperm competition.

=== Monandry and polyandry ===
==== Fecundity benefits of polyandry ====
Fecundity in P. napi varies with the number of eggs produced as well as the lifespan of the female, and is positively influenced by body mass, other genetic factors independent of body size, and with the degree of polyandry. Fecundity increases with the amount of spermatophore material and ejaculate received from males during mating. In particular, mating with recently unmated males can increase overall female reproductive output, though small females are unable to compensate for the negative effects of size on fecundity by mating multiply. However, by mating multiply, polyandrous females have overall higher lifetime fecundity, produce more offspring, and have faster-developing offspring compared to monandrous females.

==== Polyandry versus monandry is a genetically based mating strategy ====
Despite the benefits of mating multiply, many female P. napi only mate once, irrespective of the number of high quality, more fit, mates available. Monandry is more common in northern populations of P. napi, and sperm competition is correspondingly lower in the north. This polymorphic mating system is partially determined by genetic variability within the females genomes. Monandrous and polyandrous females exhibit different heritable reproductive tactics with monandrous females relying on larval derived resources to realize their fecundity and polyandrous females relying on male donations. When genetically polyandrous females are forced into monandry, due to suboptimal mating conditions, they experience reduced life spans. Monandrous and polyandrous females exhibit different life history strategies: at the start of reproduction females that are monandrous produce more eggs than polyandrous females. It is hypothesized that this life history difference is why monandry is more common in the most northern parts of the species' range, as early investment in reproduction can be more beneficial with shorter mating seasons.

==== Maintenance of the monandry/polyandry genetic polymorphism ====
The maintenance of the two mating systems had been hypothesized to be due to the availability of male nutrients, which can vary within the male-biased operational sex ratio. The male biased sex-ratio can lead to strong competition for mates among the males as well as the males are unlikely to encounter more than one female during the mating season. As a result, females often encounter males that have not recently mated that provide large nuptial gifts. Given the size of the nuptial gift provided by males, means that polyandrous females can substantially increase their lifetime fecundity. However, higher mating rates in females comes with a cost, which can explain the presence of monandrous females in primarily polyandrous populations. Polyandrous females have a higher cost of mating characterized by an increase in time spent looking for mates and time spent mating. This results in a decreased time spent looking for food.

== Taxonomy ==
Some authorities consider P. napi to be a superspecies that includes the American species mustard white and West Virginia white as well as the European dark-veined white.

However, the American butterflies cannot successfully reproduce by laying eggs on the invasive weed garlic mustard, Alliaria petiolata, a fact that threatens their survival as garlic mustard out-competes native mustard plants due to having no biological control species present in North America. In Europe, where garlic mustard is native, 76 things consume it.

== Similar species ==
- Pieris bryoniae
- Pieris ergane
- Pieris krueperi – Krueper's small white
- Pieris rapae – small white
- Pieris oleracea

== Subspecies ==
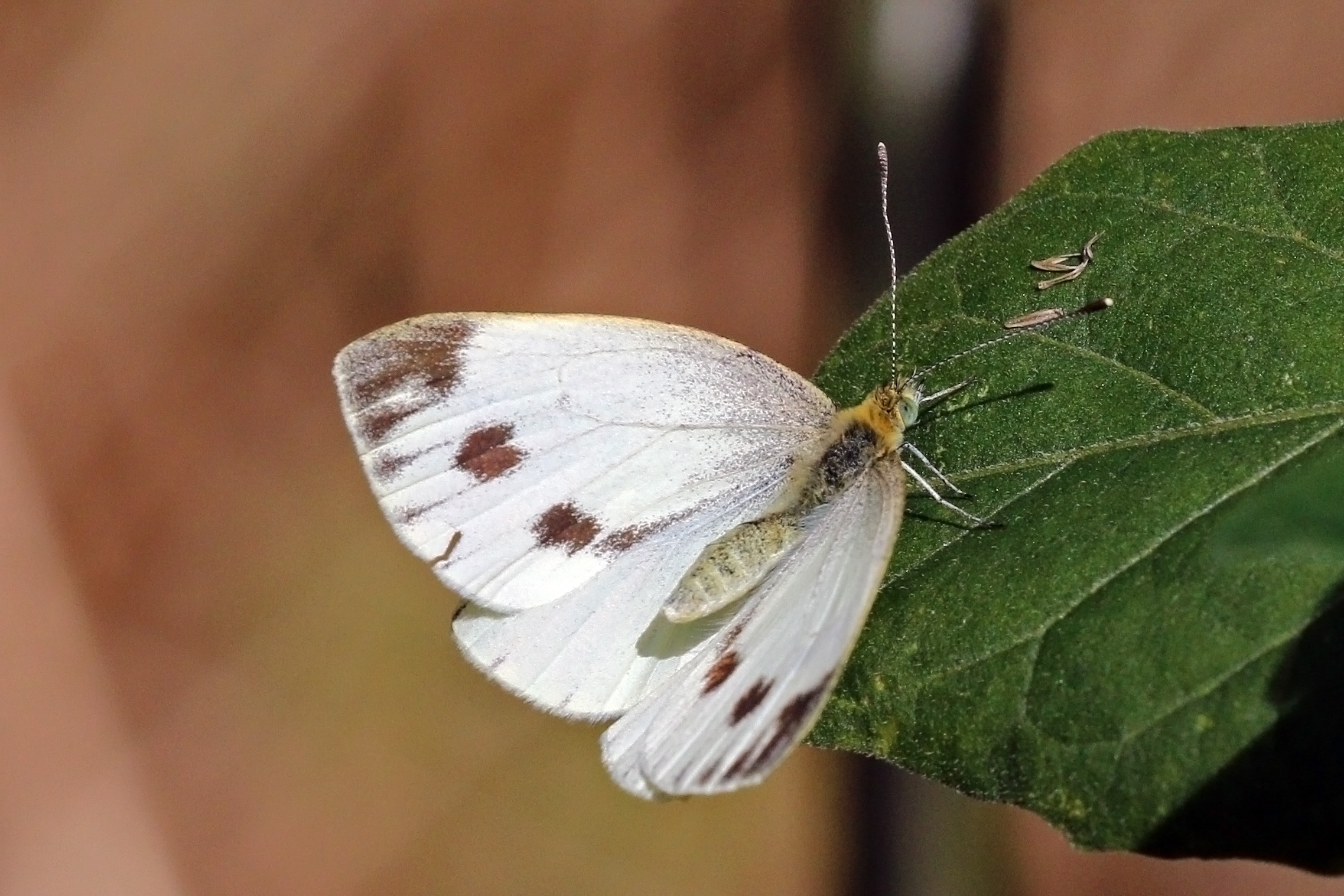
Female P.n. lusitanica Portugal

- Pieris napi napi
- Pieris napi adalwinda (Fruhstorfer, 1909) Finland, Sweden
- Pieris napi meridionalis Heyne & Rühl, 1895 Spain, Italy
- Pieris napi segonzaci (le Cerf, 1923) High Atlas
- Pieris napi maura (Verity, 1911) Glacières de Blida, Algeria
- Pieris napi atlantis (Oberthür, 1923) Azrou, Middle Atlas, Morocco
- Pieris napi flavescens (Wagner, 1903) Mödling, Austria
- Pieris napi lusitanica Lep. Portug. Porto: 2, 1929 De Sousa Portugal

For others see Wikispecies.

== Synonyms ==
- Pieris adalwinda Fruhstorfer, 1909
- Pieris arctica Verity, 1911
- Pieris canidiaformis Drenowsky, 1910
- Pieris dubiosa Röber, 1907
- Pieris flavescens Wagner, 1903
- Pieris meridionalis Heyne, 1895

== See also ==
- Dark-veined white
- Mustard white
- List of butterflies of India (Pieridae)
- List of butterflies of Great Britain
- Species problem
