= Carl Ludwig Kirschbaum =

German entomologist (1812-1880)

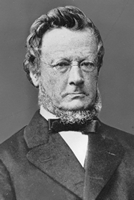
Carl Ludwig Kirschbaum

Carl Ludwig Theodor Kirschbaum (31 January 1812 in Usingen, Duchy of Nassau – 3 March 1880) was a German entomologist, Professor of Biology and Museum Director of Museum Wiesbaden. Kirschbaum specialised in Auchenorrhyncha. He wrote Die Cicadinen der Gegend von Wiesbaden und Frankfurt a. M. nebst einer Anzahl neuer oder schwer zu unterscheidender Arten aus anderen Gegenden Europas (Jahrbücher des Nassauischen Vereins für Naturkunde 21: 1-202, 1868) and many other entomological works.

His collection is in the Wiesbaden Natural History Museum. It contains his own material from Frankfurt and Wiesbaden, but also an extensive material brought to him by Carl von Heyden (mainly from various parts of southern Germany and Switzerland) and Philipp Christoph Zeller (mainly from Sicily). Smaller numbers of specimens were sent to him by Carl August Dohrn (Jena), Arnold Förster (Aachen), Fuchs (W.) (Berlin), Gustav Mayr (Wien), Wilhelm Mink (Crefeld), Hermann Rudolph Schaum (Berlin), Adolph Schenck (Weilburg), Carl Stål (Stockholm) and Peter Friedrich Ludwig Tischbein (Birkenfeld). Altogether, the collection includes 5000 individuals, 333 of which are types published in Die Cicadinen ... . This monograph describes 371 species, 172 new to science.

== Works ==
(partial list)

- (1853): Entomologische Miscellen. - Jahrbücher des Vereins für Naturkunde im Herzogthum Nassau 9: II 42-45 [Originaltitel: ].
- (1853): Verzeichnis der in der Gegend von Wiesbaden, Dillenburg und Weilburg im Herzogthum Nassau aufgefundenen Sphegiden. - Stettiner Entomologische Zeitung 14: 28-31,43-49.
- (1855): Rhynchotographische Beiträge. I. Die Capsinen der Gegend von Wiesbaden. - Jahrbücher des Vereins für Naturkunde im Herzogthum Nassau 10: 161-348.
- (1855): Über Hoplisus punctuosus Eversm. Hoplisus punctatus n. sp.. - Wiesbaden: Stein, S. 1-7.
- (1855): Über Hoplisus punctuosus Eversm. u. Hoplisus punctatus n. sp. - Moskau: Festschr. 50-jähr. Best. K. Naturf. Ges., 7 S.
- (1858): [Über die Zertheilung der Gattung Jassus in mehrerer Gattungen]. - In: Bericht über die monatlichen Sitzungen der Mitglieder des Vereins. - Jahrbücher des Vereins für Naturkunde im Herzogthum Nassau 13: 355-358.
- (1858): Die Athysanus-Arten der Gegend von Wiesbaden. - Wiesbaden: Festschrift Wett. Ges. ges. Naturk., Fünfzigjährigen Bestehens, S. 1-14.
- (1859): Bericht über die monatlichen Sitzungen der Mitglieder des Vereins. - Jahrbücher des Vereins für Naturkunde im Herzogthum Nassau 14: 450-454.
- (1863): Die Reptilien und Fische des Herzogthums Nassau. Verzeichniß und Bestimmungstabelle. - Jahrbücher des Vereins für Naturkunde im Herzogthum Nassau 17/18: 77-122.
- (1866): Nekrolog [Carl Heinrich Georg von Heyden +]. - Jahrbücher des Nassauischen Vereins für Naturkunde 19: 511-.
- (1868): Die Cicadinen der Gegend von Wiesbaden und Frankfurt a. M. nebst einer Anzahl neuer oder schwer zu unterscheidender Arten aus anderen Gegenden Europas. - Jahrbücher des Nassauischen Vereins für Naturkunde 21: 1-202.
- (1868): Die Gattung Idiocerus Lew. und ihre europäischen Arten. - Schulprogr. Königl. Gymn. 1868: 3-38, Wiesbaden.
- (1868): Nekrolog [Johann Daniel Wilhelm Bayrhoffer +]. - Jahrbücher des Nassauischen Vereins für Naturkunde 21: 429-432.
- (1872): Zoologische Mitteilungen: 1. Tringa maritima im Spessart. - Jahrbücher des Nassauischen Vereins für Naturkunde 25: 439-441.
- (1872): Zoologische Mitteilungen: 2. Über Sternschnuppengallerte. - Jahrbücher des Nassauischen Vereins für Naturkunde 25: 441-446.
- (1872): Zoologische Mitteilungen: 3. Über das Nest von Anthidium strigatum Latr.. - Jahrbücher des Nassauischen Vereins für Naturkunde 25: 446-447.
- Nekrolog [Karl Wilhelm Gottlieb Leopold Fuckel +]. - Jahrbücher des Nassauischen Vereins für Naturkunde 29/30: 432-433.
