= Istituto Sperimentale per la Zoologia Agraria =

Italian research centre

The Istituto Sperimentale per la Zoologia Agraria (Centre for Experimental Agricultural Zoology), located in Florence, Italy, is the oldest phytopathology centre in the world.

Although the Istituto Sperimentale per la Zoologia Agraria, which is also the headquarter of the Accademia Nazionale Italiana di Entomologia, was not officially formed until 1875 its activity can be traced back at least ten years prior.

In Florence scientific agriculture, promoted by the Lorena dynasty, was well established at the already centennial Academy of the Georgofili, the Ministry of Agriculture, then in Via Pandolfini. The Lorena family sought the advice of Adolfo Targioni Tozzetti, holder of the chair of Zoology and Comparative Anatomy of the Invertebrates, to obtain answers to the pressing problems presented by locusts, scale insects which were major pests of peaches, and other phytophagous insects and by diseases of silkworms. He suggested the foundation of a specialised institute.

The resultant station was a centre for the co-ordination of research into agricultural pests, mainly insects for the whole of Italy involving general agrarian representation, the Agricultural Colleges and private individuals. It was the headquarters of the Italian Entomological Society following its foundation in 1869.

Targioni, the President of that society for thirty years became the Director of the institute, the first centre for phytopathogy in the world. His main assistants were Fernandino Maria Piccioli, Aggregate Professor of Entomology and the Curator of the Gabinetto di Zoologia e Anatomia comparata degli animali invertebrate at the R. Museo di Firenze Museum of Florence. The conservator at the institute's museum was Oreste Battaglini Mancini.

The first collections of insects originated, partially, from the duplicates from La Specola. Expanded by gifts from Ferdinando Piccioli, and Marquis Pietro Bargagli. Some very large collections were then acquired: Macrolepidoptera from Fritz Rühl of Zurich, Microlepidoptera Piralidini from Otto Staudinger of Dresden, and collections from Professor Pietro Stefanelli. Many were then added by workers at the Institute and from the Forest Institute of Vallombrosa, from forest Inspectors, the "agencies" of the tobacco cultivations and from private individuals who had requested determinations. The collections are extant.

The library contains publications on agriculture and Zoology, and the institutes own publications on agrarian and forest Entomology. In the 1899 catalogue of the library it contained 1411 entomological works andjournals, these last in various languages. There were 2604 volumes, 3287 pamphlets, making a total of 7,302 units.

The Station produced a series of Reports "Relazioni a S.E. il Ministro de l'Agricoltura, Industria e Commercio, intorno ai lavori della Stazione di Entomologia Agraria", published in part in "Annali del Ministero di Agricoltura, Industria e Commercio", "Giornale delle Stazioni agrarie", in "Bullettino di Notizie Agrarie" and in "Giornale di Agricoltura". Of particular importance is volume 84 (1876) of the "Annali del Ministero di Agricoltura Industria e Commercio" in which Targioni reported on the life of the Institution in 1875, 1876, 1877–1882, 1882–1886.

The first published review from the Station was entitled "Nuove Relazioni intorno ai lavori della R. Stazione di Entomologia Agraria di Firenze", stampata dalla Tipografia di Mariano Ricci. Tali i. Such reports came in succession in years 1875, 1876, 1877–1882, 1882–1886". Each contained an entomologica report and a scientific report.

After Targioni's death from hemiplegia on 27 June 1899 the next Director was Antonio Berlese. Successive directors were: Antonio Melis, Giacomo Del Guercio, and Guido Large, formerly a professor of entomology in Bologna.
