= Anatomical model =

Three-dimensional representation of human or animal anatomy

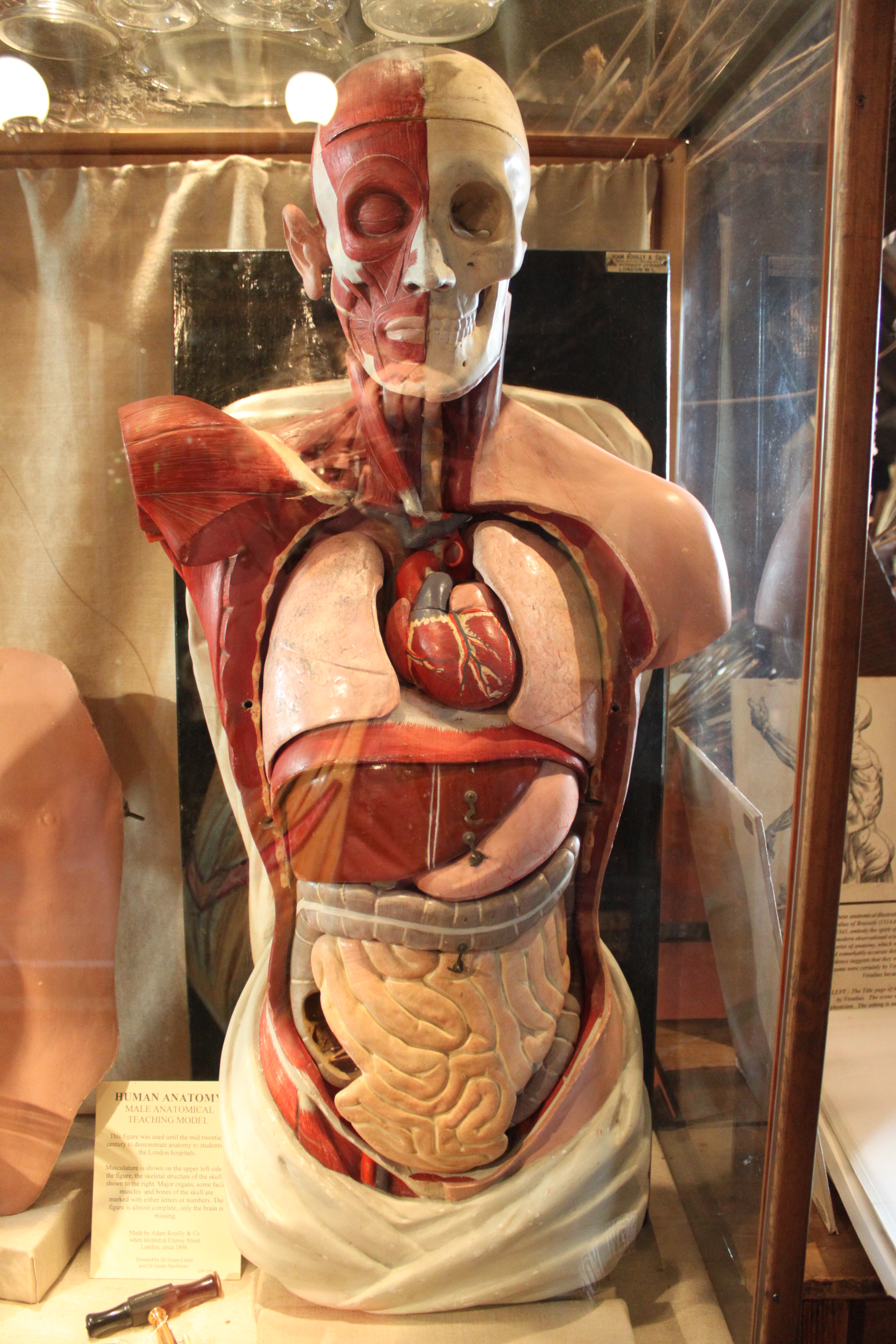
Anatomical model of a human head and torso

An anatomical model is a three-dimensional representation of human or animal anatomy, used for medical and biological education. From the 16th to the 19th century, the most prominent models were made from wax. These techniques were developed partly from a shortage of cadavers due to religious objections to their use by anatomists. The use of these models declined with the use of cadavers in modern medical instruction. Digital anatomical models have been created by scanning microscopically sliced human bodies.

== The evolution of materials and models ==
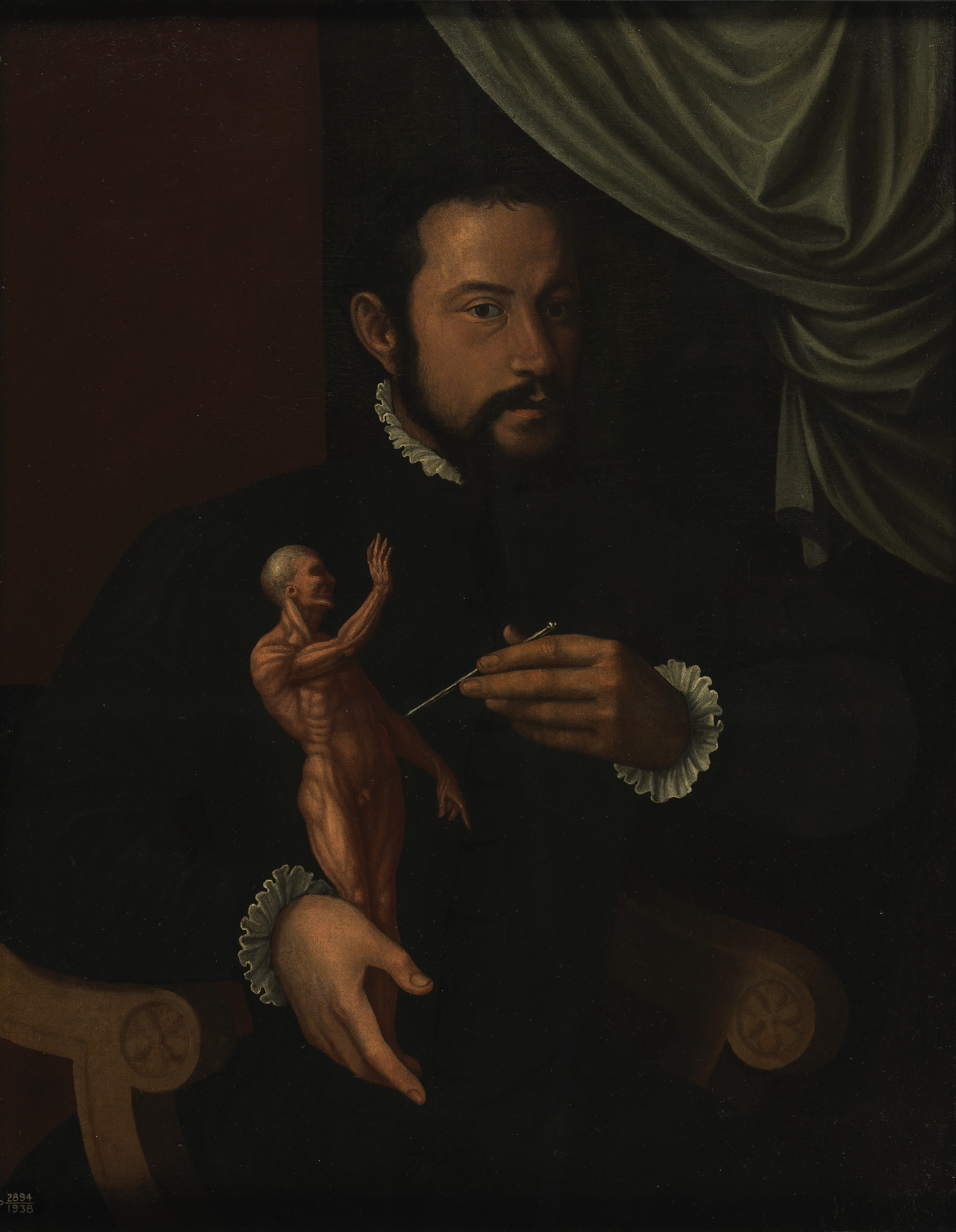
A painting showing a physician holding an "écorché"

=== Paper ===
Books with anatomical illustrations were extended by innovations such as flaps. The oldest anatomical work of this kind was produced by Heinrich Vogtherr in 1538. Andreas Vesalius published De Humani Corporis Fabrica (“On the fabric of the human body”) and the Epitome in 1543. The Epitome, allowed students to cut parts of the illustrations to produce their own layered anatomical model. Johann Remmelin produced a flap book Catoptrum Microcosmicum in 1619.

=== Wax ===
Among the earliest anatomical models was the Écorché made by Ludovico Cardi around 1600. This was widely copied and became a model and inspiration for further anatomical models. By the end of the 17th century the first anatomical wax models were produced by artists like Gaetano Giulio Zumbo collaborating with the anatomist Guillaume Desnoues. The growth of anatomical instruction and medical education in Italy led to more work on models. Noted artist included Giovanni Manzolini and his wife Anna Morandi working in Bologna which became a centre for the development of the art. Joseph Towne (1808–1879) was one of the few who attempted similar work in England. In the 19th century reclining models of women meant for medical instruction came to be called "Venuses" after Venus de Medici, typically showing a fetus in position. Other Italian artists included Clemente Susini (1754–1814), Ercole Lelli (1702–1766), Giuseppe Astorri (1795–1852), and Francesco Calenzuoli (1796–1829). In Germany Rudolf Weisker began an Institute for Wax Modelling (Institut für Wachsbildnerei) in Leipzig. These developed wax models beyond humans into the zoological domain. Gustav Zeiller (1826-1904) worked with the anatomists Carl Bogislaus Reichert, Johannes Müller, Friedrich Theodor von Frerichs, or Emil Du Bois-Reymond while his brother Paul Zeiller (1820–1893) worked with Michael Erd in Munich. Paul Zeiller and his wife Franziska also protested the use of dissections in anatomical teaching. Wax models went into decline at the end of the 19th century.

The model may show the anatomy partially dissected, or have removable parts allowing the student to remove and inspect the modelled body parts. Some models may have changeable genital inserts and other interchangeable parts which permit a unisex model to represent an individual of either sex.

=== Digital ===
One of the first computational models was through the ADAM project. Although 3D computer models of anatomy now exist as an alternative, physical anatomical models still have advantages in providing insight into anatomy.

== See also ==
- Anatomy
- Visible Human Project
- Comparative anatomy
- Mannequin § Medical education
