= Pietro Bargagli =

Italian entomologist

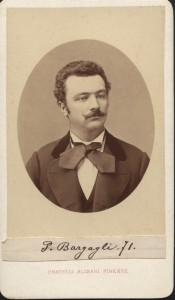
Pietro Bargagagli

Pietro Bargagli (2 August 1844, Siena – November 1918 Florence) was an Italian entomologist who specialised in Coleoptera. His collection is in La Specola and the Istituto Sperimentale per la Zoologia Agraria. He was a member of La Società Entomologica Italiana.

== Works ==
Partial list.

- Escursioni entomologiche sulla montagna di Cetona. Bullettino della Società Entomologica italiana 2: 169-176 (1870)
- Materiali per la fauna entomologica dell'isola Sardegna. Bull. Soc. ent. Hal., 5: 244-256 (1873).
- Ricordi di una escursione entomologica al Monte Amiata. Bullettino della Società Entomologica italiana 7: 122-133 (1875).
- Ricordi di una escursione entomologica al Monte Amiata. Coleotteri. Bullettino della Società Entomologica italiana 7: 257-265 (1875).
- Insetti Comestibili Lettura nell. Soc. Entomol. Ital. Revista Europaea-Riv. Internaz. Fasc. 16, 6, 11 pp (1877)
- Note intorno alla biologia di alcuni Coleotteri. Bolletino della Società Entomologica italiana, Genova, 16 (1884).
