= Nabothian cyst =

Mucus filled cyst on the surface of the cervix

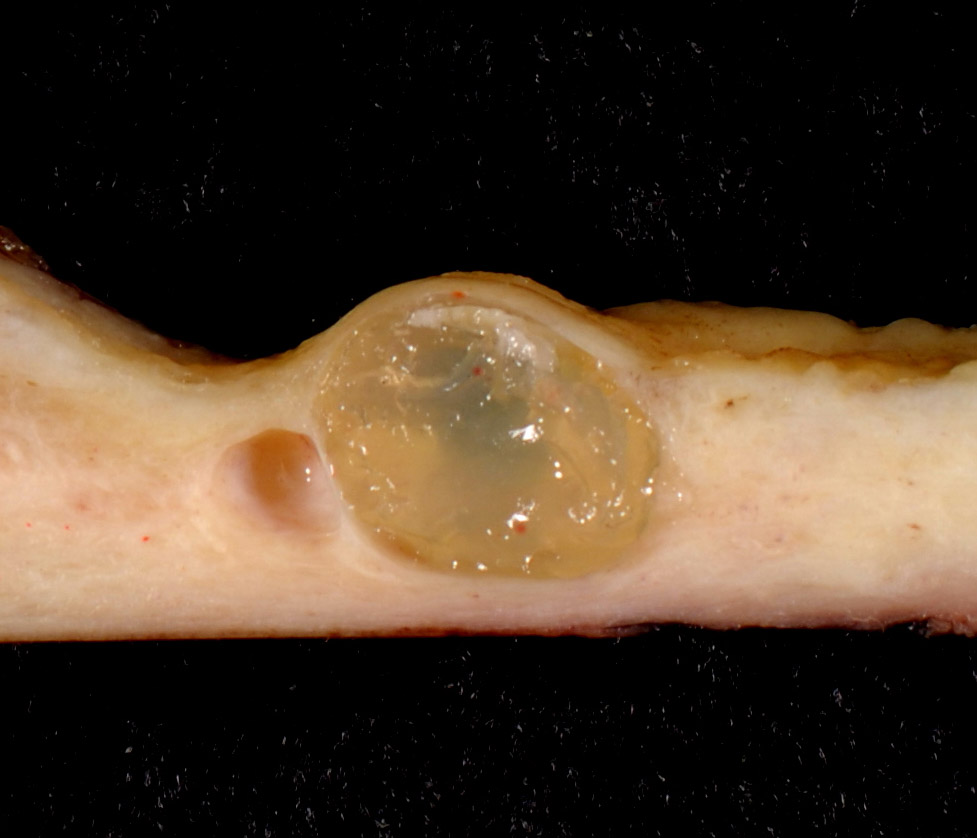
- Nabothian cyst
- Specialty: Obstetrics and gynaecology

A nabothian cyst (or nabothian follicle) is a mucus-filled cyst on the surface of the cervix. They are most often caused when stratified squamous epithelium of the ectocervix (portion nearest to the vagina) grows over the simple columnar epithelium of the endocervix (portion nearest to the uterus). This tissue growth can block the cervical crypts (subdermal pockets usually 2–10 mm in diameter), trapping cervical mucus inside the crypts.

== Presentation ==
Nabothian cysts appear most often as firm bumps on the cervix's surface. A woman may notice the cyst when inserting a diaphragm or cervical cap, or when checking the cervix as part of fertility awareness. A health care provider may notice the cysts during a pelvic exam.

Nabothian cysts are also incidentally found during MRI imaging. During the healing process of chronic cervicitis, squamous epithelium of ectocervix proliferates and enter the cervical canal (endocervix), covering and obstructing the columnar epithelium of endocervical glands. Thus, retention of mucus in the endocervical glands causes cyst formation. The size of the cyst may vary from a few millimetres to 4 cm in diameter.

== Diagnosis ==
If a cyst has an unusual appearance, a colposcopy will be performed to rule out other diagnoses. If the blood vessels are short, comma-like or corkscrew-shaped and bleed on contact, then the cyst may be a very rare mucin-producing carcinoma of the cervix. Magnetic resonance imaging is used to distinguish cancer from the typical nabothian cyst.

T1-weighted MRI imaging would show intermediate to high intensity while T2-weighted imaging would show high signal intensity. Findings of solid components separating multiple cysts would be suggestive of adenoma malignum (a form of cervical cancer).

== Treatment ==
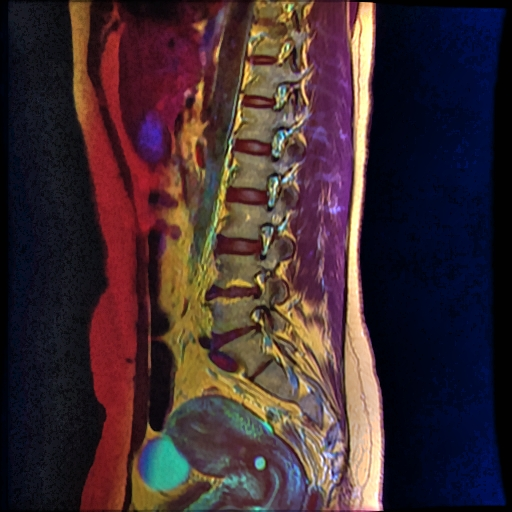
Color MRI showing nabothian cyst as small blue circle in cervical region

Nabothian cysts usually require no treatment and frequently resolve on their own. Cryotherapy has been used to treat nabothian cysts but is rarely necessary. Very rarely a cyst may be so large that it prevents a clinician from performing a pap smear, in which case the clinician may puncture the cyst with a needle and drain it. If nabothian cysts occur with chronic cervicitis (inflammation of the cervix) then the underlying cause of the inflammation must be treated.

== Eponym ==
Nabothian cysts are also known as nabothian follicles, mucinous retention cysts, or epithelial inclusion cysts. They are named after German anatomist Martin Naboth (1675–1721), who wrote about them in a 1707 treatise titled De sterilitate mulierum. However, they were earlier described by French surgeon Guillaume Desnoues (1650–1735). Since it is a derived term, nabothian is not spelled with a capital first letter.

== See also ==
- Cyst
- Polyp (medicine)
