= Fritz Wagner =

Fritz Wagner may refer to:

- Fritz Wagner (entomologist) (1873–1938), Austrian entomologist
- Fritz Arno Wagner (1889–1958), German cinematographer
- Fritz Wagner (footballer) (1913–1987), Swiss footballer
- Fritz Wagner (actor) (1915–1982), German actor
- Friedrich Wagner (born 1943), German physicist
