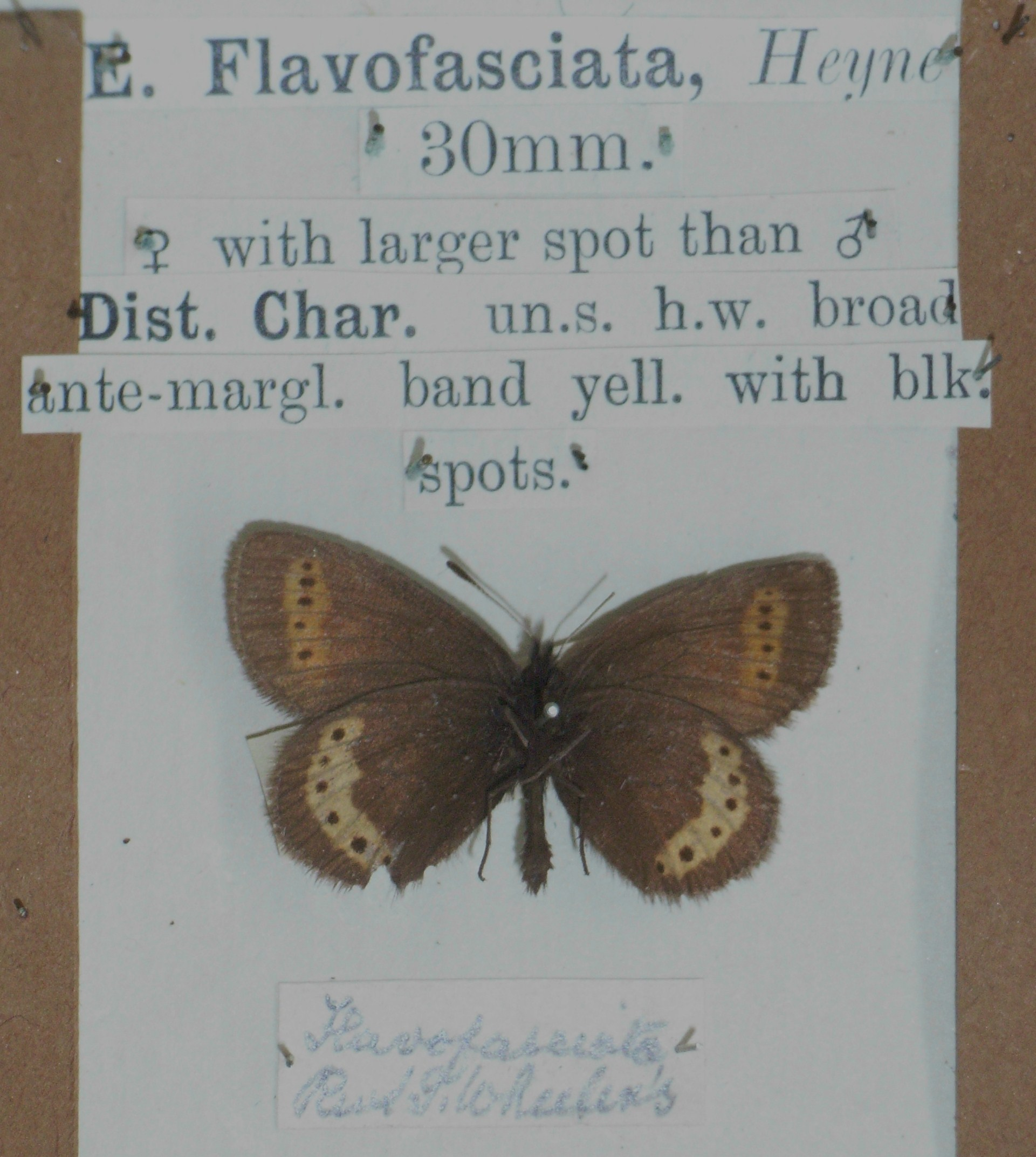
- Langham and Wheeler collection - Ulster Museum

Scientific classification
- Kingdom: Animalia
- Phylum: Arthropoda
- Clade: Pancrustacea
- Class: Insecta
- Order: Lepidoptera
- Family: Nymphalidae
- Genus: Erebia
- Species: E. flavofasciata

Binomial name
- Erebia flavofasciata Heyne, [1895]

= Yellow-banded ringlet =

Species of butterfly

The yellow-banded ringlet (Erebia flavofasciata) is a member of the subfamily Satyrinae of the family Nymphalidae. It is a high mountain butterfly found in a small area of the Alps in Switzerland and Italy.

== Description in Seitz ==
E. flavofasciata Heyne (36 b). This interesting Erebia has only lately been discovered. Lieutenant-Colonel von Nolte obtained the first specimens in July 1893 in the Alps of Tessin in the Campolungo-Pass near Fusio. Later the species has also been found, in a but slightly different form, at Pontresina in the upper Engadine. In shape and size like cassiope, but nearer melampus in pattern. Ground-colour dark brown, as in most Erebias, the female being distinctly paler. The narrow russet-brown distal band of the forewing is separated by the veins into 5—6 rounded or ovate spots which bear small black dots; the spots in cellules 4 and 5 are generally somewhat elongate and bear a stronger black dot than the others. The hindwing above bears before the outer margin 4 russet-yellow rounded spots with black dots. In the female these spots are larger and have stronger black dots. The underside of the forewing greyish brown, the more yellow-brown distal band not separated into spots as above but continuous, also somewhat broader. The black dots contrast sharply. The central area has a feebly red-brown tint which gradually fades away proximally. The hindwing beneath is brownish grey; there is, before the outer margin and parallel with the same, a rather large straw-yellow band, which extends from the costal margin to near the anal angle. In this band there is a row of 5 — 6 black dots of almost even size, being shifted a little distad. The female beneath is lighter and brighter in colour than the male. — The form thiemei Bartel (36 c) from the Engadine is darker than specimens from Tessin. The distal band of the forewing is separated into isolated spots of different sizes. The number of these small spots, which have but feeble black dots, varies, the spots being sometimes obsolescent. Otherwise but little different from the name-typical form. — The butterflies occur on steep grassy and rocky slopes.

Its larval host plant is unknown. A Swiss subspecies, Erebia flavofasciata warreni, has been proposed.
