= La Specola =

Natural history museum in Florence, Italy

Coordinates: 43°45′52.31″N 11°14′50.43″E

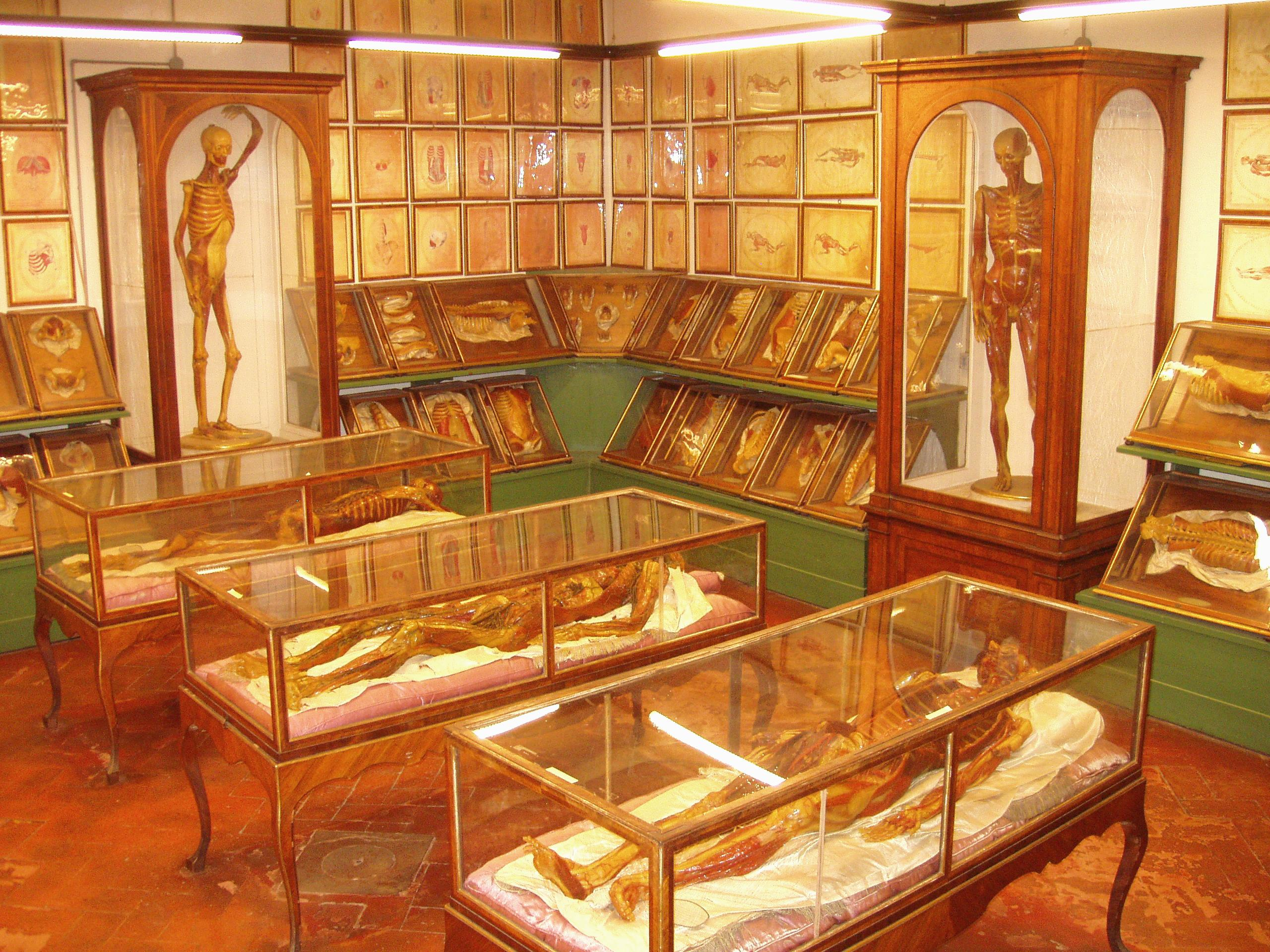
Wax anatomical models.

The Museum of Zoology and Natural History, best known as La Specola, is an eclectic natural history museum in Florence, central Italy, located next to the Pitti Palace. The name Specola means observatory, a reference to the astronomical observatory founded there in 1790. It now forms part of the Museo di Storia Naturale di Firenze. This museum is part of what are now six different collections at four different sites for the Museo di Storia Naturale di Firenze.

== History ==
The museum has deep ties with history; parts of the collection can be traced back to the Medici Family. It is known for its collection of wax anatomical models from the 18th century. It is the oldest scientific Museum of Europe.

This museum is located in the former Palazzo Torrigani at Via Romana 17, near the Pitti Palace. The Imperial Regio Museo di Fisica e Storia Naturale (The Imperial-Royal Museum for Physics and Natural History) was founded in 1771 by Grand Duke Peter Leopold to display publicly the large collection of natural curiosities such as fossils, animals, minerals and exotic plants acquired by several generations of the Medici. At the time of its opening, and for the first years of the 19th century, it was the only scientific museum or Wunderkammer of its kind specifically created for the public to view. It opened on 21 February 1775 to the public.

Today the museum spans 34 rooms and contains not only zoological subjects, such as a stuffed hippopotamus (a 17th-century Medici pet, which once lived in the Boboli Gardens), but also a collection of anatomical waxes (including those by Gaetano Giulio Zumbo and Clemente Susini), an art developed in Florence in the 17th century for the purpose of teaching medicine. This collection is very famous worldwide for the extraordinary accuracy and realism of the details, copied from corpses. Also in La Specola on display are scientific and medical instruments. Parts of the museum are decorated with frescoes and pietra dura representing some of the principal Italian scientific achievements from the Renaissance to the late 18th century.

The collections include

- Entomological collections belonging to:
  - Camillo Rondani, specimens of Diptera and Hymenoptera
  - Ruggero Verity, specimens of Lepidoptera
  - Pietro Stefanelli, specimens of Lepidoptera
  - Victor Antoine Signoret, specimen of Hemiptera
  - Adolfo Targioni Tozzetti
  - Fernandino Maria Piccioli
  - Waldemar Fuchs, specimens of Coleoptera
  - Pietro Bargagli, specimens of Coleoptera
- Giacomo Damiani, ornithological collections
- Skeleton of the famous Hansken the elephant (1630 – Florence, 9 November 1655)
