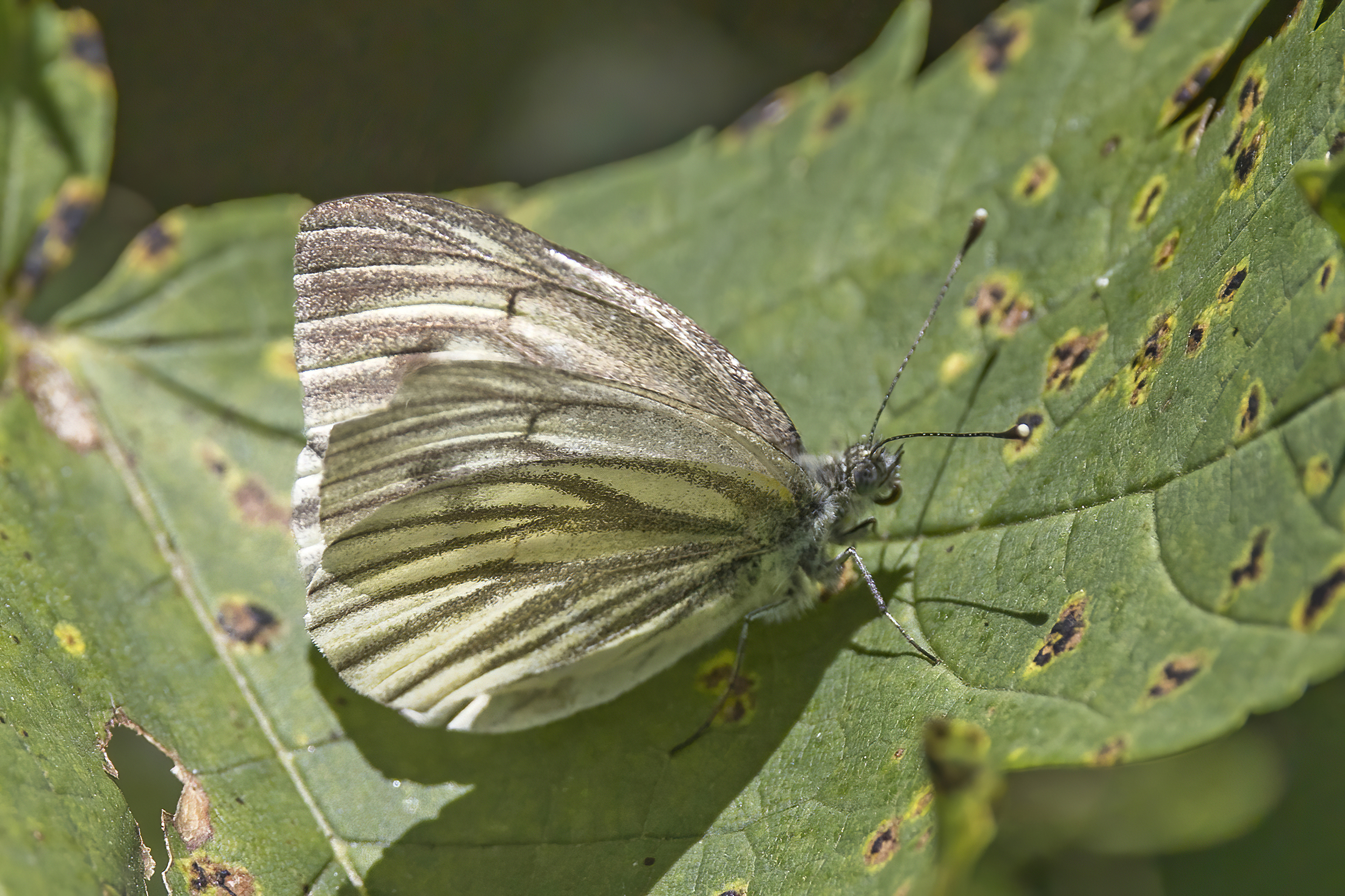
- Female, Romania

Scientific classification
- Kingdom: Animalia
- Phylum: Arthropoda
- Clade: Pancrustacea
- Class: Insecta
- Order: Lepidoptera
- Family: Pieridae
- Genus: Pieris
- Species: P. bryoniae

Binomial name
- Pieris bryoniae (Hübner, 1806)

= Pieris bryoniae =

Dark-veined white

Species of butterfly

Pieris bryoniae, the dark-veined white or mountain green-veined white, is a Palearctic butterfly of the family Pieridae.

It has variously been considered to be a full species, a subspecies of Pieris napi or a superspecies complex.

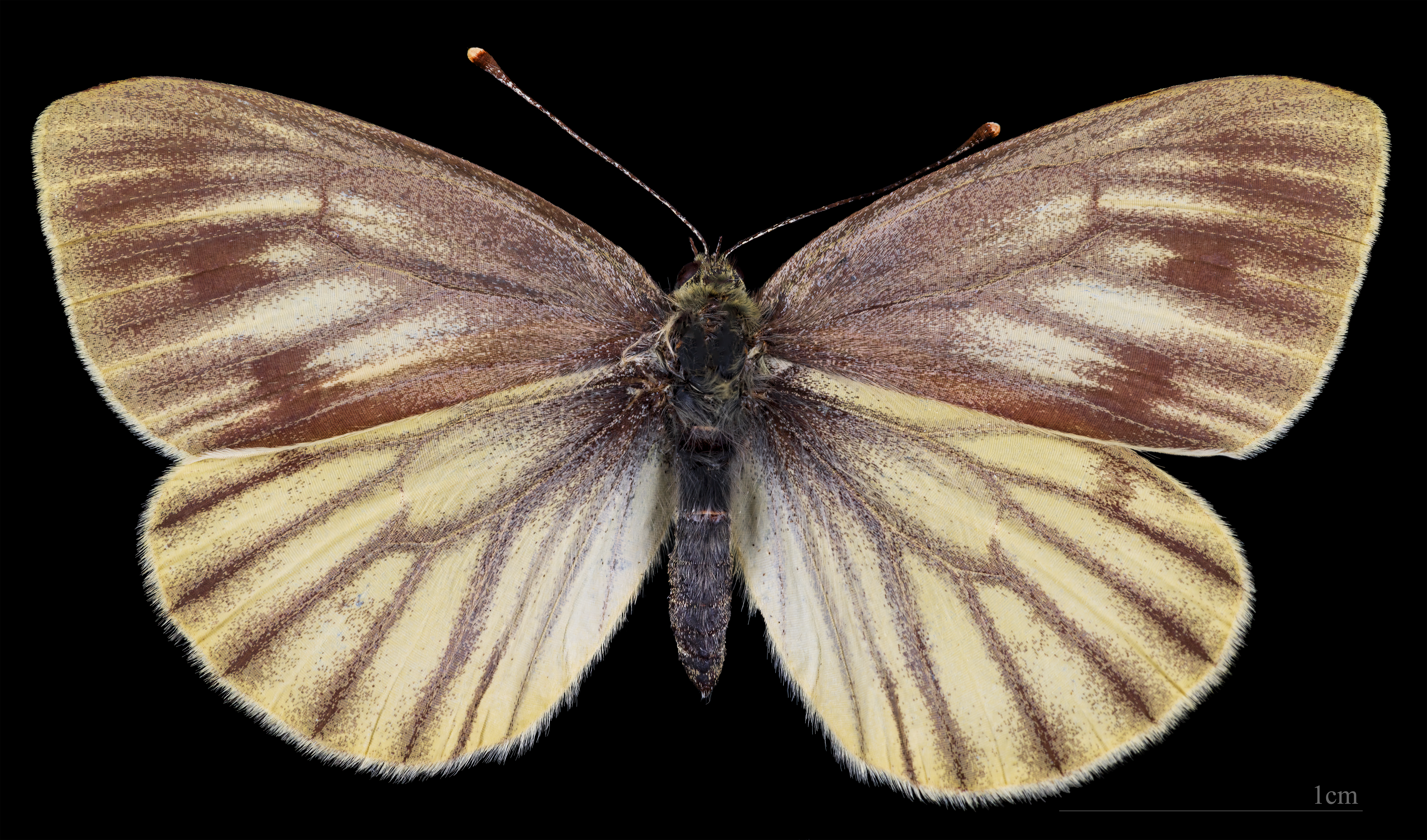
♀

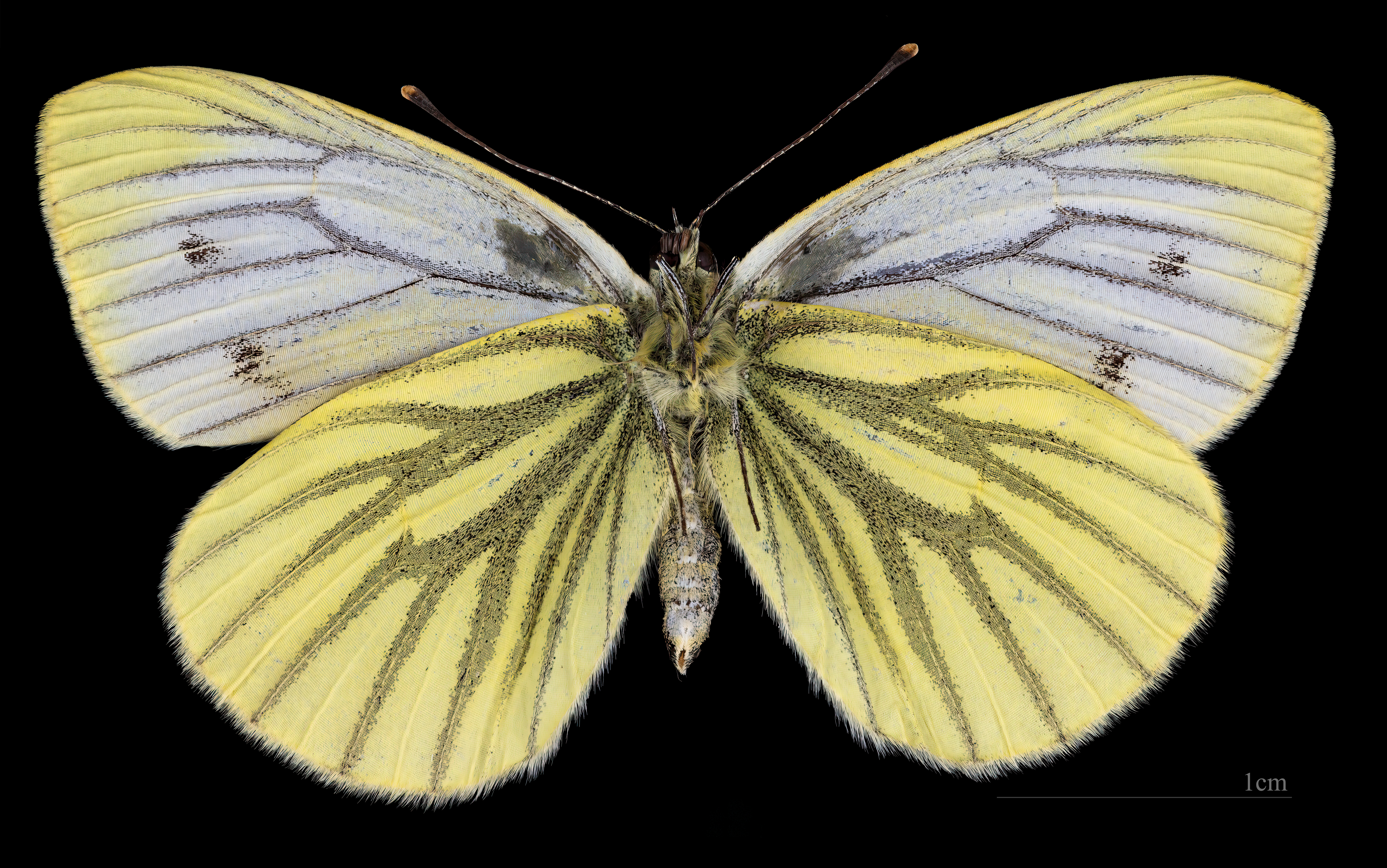
♀ △

== Description and Differentiation ==
Seitz-bryoniae (21c), which inhabits the Alps, Northern Scandinavia and the mountains of Asia Minor; the male of the latter is rather more narrow-winged than napi-males, not bearing any markings on the forewing above except the blackish apical and basal areas; the female has a yellowish ground-colour, which is however more or less suppressed by the great extent of the dark scaling situated along the veins. Among the females there occur specimens in which the discal spots and the vein-streaks of the forewing are strongly obsolescent, there being consequently no prominent marking; we name this form ab. obsoleta nov.; individuals in which the yellowish ground-colour, especially on the forewing, is almost entirely suppressed by the greater extension of the dark scaling may be named ab. concolor nov..The form kamtschadalis Bang-Haas i. 1., from Kamchatka, is in the female somewhat paler than bryoniaeand the discal spots of the forewing are less sharply marked, the hindwing beneath being much paler. sifanica Gr.-Grsh., from Amdo, is nearly as large as orientis [Pieris melete orientis Oberthür, 1880]; in males the veins are broadly edged with greenish black beneath; it has not yet been ascertained if sifanica is really different from orientis.

The main difference with respect to the phylogenetically similar species (Pieris napi, Pieris ergane, Pieris rapae) is the presence of much more marked alar veins on both wings, especially on the upper part. The female has a basic coloration ranging from yellowish to greyish-brown. In some cases, the male is almost indistinguishable, as sexual dimorphism is almost absent. In some cases there is a blackish-gray band along the entire external margin of the fore wing. On the rear wing the endings of the veins may widen to form dark triangulations. The summer generations are paler than the spring ones and, in general, the front wings are paler than the rear ones, as well as having less marked veins. Other less evident morphological characteristics are currently the subject of discussion among entomologists, given that their relevance appears only in restricted populations.The wingspan is between 4 and 4.4 cm. Ireland female napi are often heavily marked but Langham (1922) failed to find bryoniae.

The type locality of the nominate form is the Alps, where it is found at considerable altitudes (up to 2000 m) and has only one generation per year. Both pairs of the female's wings are dark. At lower altitudes, two or three generations appear during a year. Subspecies neobryoniae, closely resembles the Carpathian populations, and is found in the southern parts of the Alps and ssp. flavescens Wagner inhabits the northern parts. The ground coloration of the wings is yellowish or rich yellow, often with a mauve gloss. The populations inhabiting the Carpathians are very varied. The most distinct ones include the ssp. vihorlatensis found in Vihorlat, the east Slovak mountains. Others are Pieris bryoniae adalwinda Fruhstorfer, 1909 Type locality: Norway, Porsanger.Pieris bryoniae bicolorata (Petersen, 1947) Type locality: Schweden, Murjek

- Pieris bryoniae bryonides Sheljuzhko, 1910 Type locality: Russia
- Pieris bryoniae caucasica Lorkovic, 1968 Type locality: NW Kaukasus
- Pieris bryoniae carpathensis Moucha, 1956 Type locality: Eats Karpates, Osa
- Pieris bryoniae flavescens (Müller, 1933) Type locality: Austria, Mödling, Wien
- Pieris bryoniae kamtschadalis (Röber, 1907) Type locality: Kamtschatka
- Pieris bryoniae lorcovici Eitschberger, 1983 Type locality: Juliske Alpe, Vršic (North), 1400–1600 m.
- Pieris bryoniae marani Moucha, 1956 Type locality: Slovakia, Zadiel Tal
- Pieris bryoniae schintlmeisteri Eitschberger, 1983 Type locality: USSR, Jakutia, Tommot
- Pieris bryoniae sheljuzhkoi Eitschberger, 1983 Type locality: Omsukchan, Magadan Gebiet
- Pieris bryoniae sifanica (Grum-Grshimailo, 1895) Type locality: Amdo
- Pieris bryoniae turcica Eitschberger & Hesselbarth, 1977 Type locality: Turkey, Anatolia, Ilgaz dagh-Pass, 1800 m.
- Pieris bryoniae vitimensis (Verity, 1911) Type locality: Russia, Vitim
- Pieris bryoniae wolfsbergeri Eitschberger, 1983 Type locality: Italia, Piemonte, Termi di Valdieri, S. Giovanni, 1500 m.

== Occurrence and habitat ==
The species occurs in the Alps, the Fatra (Slovakia), the High Tatras, the Carpathians, parts of Turkey, the Caucasus, the Tian Shan and the Altai. The altitudinal distribution includes locations between 800 and 2700 meters. Typical habitats are mountainous meadows and flower-filled stream banks. In regions where the flight range of napi and bryoniae overlaps, hybrids napi x bryoniae can form .Because of the inherited migratory behavior of napi, these are occasionally found outside of the actual area of occurrence. However, these hybridsare us usually not capable of reproduction.

== Biology ==
In most areas of occurrence, they fly in one generation from May to September, only occasionally further generations can occur. The forage plants of the caterpillars include various cruciferous plants (Brassicaceae), for example Biscutella laevigata or Lunaria rediviva. The species overwinters as a pupa .

== Other ==
It is sought after by collectors, particularly in Austria. This is because one of the most variable populations of this butterfly lives in the Mödling area near Vienna.
