= Fernandino Maria Piccioli =

Italian entomologist

Ferdinando Maria Piccioli (26 July 1821 – 14 February 1900) was an Italian entomologist. He specialised in Hymenoptera and Coleoptera.

Born at San Felice, Piccioli was an “Assistant” at the Stazione di Entomologia Agraria in Florence. He was a member of the founding committee of La Società Entomologica Italiana.

Part of his collections of Tuscany Coleoptera are in the Genoa Natural History Museum. The remainder of the Coleoptera and his Hymenoptera, Diptera, Lepidoptera and other Orders are in La Specola museum.

He died at Sesto Fiorentino in 1900.
