= Leonello Picco =

Italian entomologist

Leonello Picco (1876–1921) was an Italian entomologist who specialised in Coleoptera and Hemiptera.

His main work was Contributo allo studio della fauna entomologica Italiano. Elenco sistematico degli Emitteri finora raccolti nella Provincia di Roma. (1908). This treatise is a catalogue in systematic order of 423 species in 229 genera and 24 families of Hemiptera from the Province of Rome with full references as a contribution to an entomological fauna of Italy. It builds on the previous list of Carlo de Fiore which listed 144 species in 100 genera. Picco acknowledges the help of Giovanni Battista Grassi then Professor in Rome. A meticulous entomologist and specialist Picco lists the works he used for determinations principally monographs by Franz Xaver Fieber, Étienne Mulsant and Charles Jean-Baptiste Amyot. He described Evacanthus rostagnoi (Picco, L. 1921), a species of Leafhopper. His collection is in the Museo Civico di Zoologia in Rome. Picco was a Member of La Società Entomologica Italiana.

== Works ==
- Picco, L. 1919 Descrizione de tre nuove specie di Emitteri dell'Italia centrale. Bollettino della Società Entomologica Italiana, 4(1). (1921): 99–107.
