= Pietro Stefanelli =

Italian Professor of Entomology

Pietro Stefanelli (30 July 1835, Florence – 23 December 1919, Florence) was an Italian Professor of Entomology. mainly interested in Lepidoptera and Odonata.He was a founding member of the Italian Entomological Society. He was also instrumental in the early development of Istituto Sperimentale per la Zoologia Agraria being especially concerned with pest species of Lepidoptera.His collection of foreign and Italian Lepidoptera is in the Zoological Museum La Specola and in the Istituto Istituto Sperimentale per la Zooogia Agraria.

== Sources ==
- Conci, C. & Poggi, R. 1996: Iconography of Italian Entomologists, with essential biographical data. Mem. Soc. Ent. Ital. 75 159–382.418 figures.Portrait.
- Poggi, R. & Conci, C. 1996: Stefanelli, P.] Mem. Soc. Ent. Ital. 75:107
