= Adolph Schenck =

German entomologist

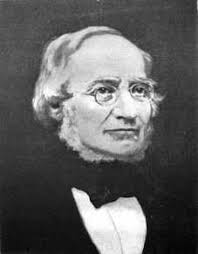
Adolph Schenck

Adolph Schenck (born 11 April 1803 in Dillenburg, Germany, died February 23, 1878 ) was a German entomologist and teacher.

Philipp Adolph Schenck was a son of Judicial Counselor and mining assessor, Johann Jacob Schenck (born May 23, 1763 in Siegen, Germany, February 14, 1805 in Dillenburg) and Sophie Karoline, b. Jaeckel, from Herborn (1767-1836). At the age of 9, he suffered a knee injury while playing, which developed into a paralysis of the right leg which meant that he had to use a walking aid for a long time. Despite this disability he was able to collect entomological specimens in the field and amass an important collection, including the discovery of an otherwise Mediterranean species of spider wasp.

Schenck attended the Boys' School (Pädagogium) in Dillenburg until 1818, then the Grammar School in Weilburg (Gymnasium Philippinum Weilburg), where he took the Abitur in 1821. He then studied philology, natural sciences and pedagogy at the University of Göttingen, and in 1824, he took the teacher's examination in the fields of natural sciences, mathematics, ancient languages and history in Weilburg. Schenck then worked as a private tutor and taught mathematics at the Weilburg Gymnasium. From 1828 to 1830 he worked as an auxiliary teacher at the preparatory school (Progymnasium) in Hadamar, where he held the position of the second vice rector until 1835, here he taught German, Latin, history, geography, mathematics and natural history.

On 1 August 1830, Adolph Schenck married Julie Stöckicht, who came from Braubach, (born 1811, died 24 November 1882 in Weilburg). In the autumn of 1835 he returned to the Boys' School in Dillenburg, where he held the office of the prorector from Easter 1841 to 1845, teaching Greek and Hebrew, and in June 1844 was appointed professor. While in Dillenburg he initiated the creation of a Botanical Garden while also being involved in entomological field studies. In 1845, Schenck was transferred to the Gymnasium in Weilburg against his will, and in 1876, he became the first lecturer. At his own request he retired on October 1, 1876. Schenck was a corresponding member or honorary member of several natural sciences and societies. In recognition of his work on insects, the Philipps-Universität Marburg awarded him an Honorary Doctorate of Philosophy and he was appointed to the Order of the Red Eagle by the Kaiser Wilhelm I.

After retirement Schenck remained an active researcher, corresponding member of many entomological societies and lecturer up to his death. he was on his way to give a lecture when he died of a stroke in Weilburg on the 23 February 1878. He is buried in the Old Cemetery in Weilburg where his grave can still be seen.

Schenck was described as charismatic educator and natural scientist who was "modest and unobtrusive, but ambitious for himself and his pupils." He was also described as an disciplinarian, who instilled fear in his pupils, but they always ended up respecting him. His pupils enthusiastically joined in his biological excursions, his colleagues remembered his some times prickly nature. This is how he acquired his nickname "Alte Granit" which means "old granite". The restrictions his lifelong disability imposed on him may have contributed to his temper. The relationship between Schenck and other entomologists varied, Schenck and Carl Eduard Adolph Gerstaecker, were on bad terms all of Schenck's life but with his former student Carl Ludwig Kirschbaum he was friends until his death. Schenck conducted intense correspondence with numerous German and foreign entomologists and also assisted these colleagues with extensive exchanges of insect specimens. Among the entomologists he exchanged speciemsn with and had correspondenve with were Arnold Förster, William Nylander and Frederick Smith.

Schenck had an ability to identify different insect species despite their apparent uniformity, and used this to determine new species and to uncover newly described forms which were in fact already known. For example, the slave-making ant Strongylognathus testaceus was discovered by him in Weilburg in 1850, and the workerless socially parasitic ant Myrmica atratulus which had also been discovered in Weilburg, Of the more than 500 bee species found in Germany, more than 40 of them were described scientifically for the first time by Schenck and are regarded as valid species today. Schenck's scientific literary work is astonishing. Many of his papers were published in the "Jahrbuchen des vereins fur Naturkunde im Herzogthun Nassau" ("Yearbook of the Association for Natural History in the Duchy of Nassau"). His work includes "Beschriebung Nassauischer Amiensarten (A Description of the Ants of Nassau") ", and works on Sphecid wasps, bees and vespid wasps. Other publications by Schenck can be found in the "Berliner Entomologisches Zeitschrift", the Entomologische Nachrichten, and in various publications of the Weilburg Gymnasiums.

Schenck's extensive natural science collections were divided up after his death, and, unfortunately, they have not all been preserved. However, Schenck's collection of Hymenoptera, was preserved and became the property of the Zoological Institute of Marburg. This extensive collection, comprising circa 13,400 specimens, was transferred to the Senckenberg Museum in Frankfurt in exchange for other material.

The following species were named after Schenck because of the importance of his entomological work Andrena schencki, Sphecodes schenckii, Psenulus schencki, Myrmica schencki and Chrysis schencki, all Hymenoptera.

== Publications ==
- Schenck, A. 1840. Ueber den naturwissenschaftlichen Unterricht auf Pädagogien und Gymnasien. Programm des Pädagogiums zu Dillenburg Fortsetzung 1841, Dillenburg, pp. 3 – 38, 3 - 65
- Schenck, A. 1845. Anleitung zur Bestimmung der im Herzogthum Nassau und dessen Umgebung wildwachsenden Pflanzen-Gattungen nebst pädagogisch-didactischen Vorbemerkungen. Programm des Pädagogiums zu Dillenburg 1845, Dillenburg, pp. 1–111
- Schenck, A. 1851. Beschreibung nassauischer Bienenarten. Jahrbücher des Nassauischen Vereins für Naturkunde Volume 7, Wiesbaden, pp 1–106
- Schenck, A. 1852. Beschreibung Nassauischer Ameisenarten. Jahrbücher des Nassauischen Vereins für Naturkunde Volume 8, Wiesbaden, pp 1–149
- Schenck, A. 1853 Beschreibung nassauischer Arten der Familie der Faltenwespen (Vesparia, Diploptera). Jahrbücher des Nassauischen Vereins für Naturkunde Volume 9, Wiesbaden, pp 1–87
- Schenck, A. 1853. Nachtrag zu der Beschreibung nassauischer Bienenarten (siehe Heft 7). Jahrbücher des Nassauischen Vereins für Naturkunde Volume 9, Wiesbaden, pp 88–307
- Schenck, A. 1853. Die nassauischen Ameisenspecies. Stettiner Entomologische Zeitung Volume 14, Stettin, S. 157-163
- Schenck, A. 1853. Monographie der geselligen Wespen mit besonderer Berücksichtigung der nassauischen Species. Programm des königlichen Gymnasiums zu Weilburg für das Schuljahr 1853 24pp.
- Schenck, A. 1855. Über einige schwierige Genera und Species aus der Familie der Bienen. Jahrbücher des Nassauischen Vereins für Naturkunde Volume 10, Wiesbaden, pp 137–149
- Schenck, A. 1855. Über die im Heft VIII Eciton testaceum genannte Ameise. Jahrbücher des Nassauischen Vereins für Naturkunde Volume 10, Wiesbade, p150
- Schenck, A. 1855. Register zu der Beschreibung nassauischer Bienenarten im Heft VII, Heft IX und X. Jahrbücher des Nassauischen Vereins für Naturkunde Volume 10, Wiesbaden, pp 151–160
- Schenck, A. 1856. Beschreibung der in Nassau aufgefundenen Goldwespen (Chrysidida) nebst einer Einleitung über die Familien im Allgemeinen und einer kurzen Beschreibung der übrigen deutschen Arten. Jahrbücher des Nassauischen Vereins für Naturkunde Volume 11:; Wiesbaden, pp13–89
- Schenck, A. 1856. Systematische Eintheilung der nassauischen Ameisen nach Mayr. Jahrbücher des Nassauischen Vereins für Naturkunde Volume 11, Wiesbaden, pp 90–96
- Schenck, A. 1857. Beschreibung der in Nassau aufgefundenen Grabwespen. Jahrbücher des Nassauischen Vereins für Naturkunde Volume 12, Wiesbaden, pp 1–341
- Schenck, A. 1859. Die nassauischen Bienen. Revision und Ergänzung der früheren Bearbeitungen. Jahrbücher des Nassauischen Vereins für Naturkunde, Volume 14, Wiesbaden, pp 1–414
- Schenck, A. 1859. Die deutschen Gattungsnamen der Bienen. Jahrbücher des Nassauischen Vereins für Naturkunde Volume 14, Wiesbaden, pp 415 – 416
- Schenck, A. 1859. Die Honigbiene vom Hymettus. Jahrbücher des Nassauischen Vereins für Naturkunde Volume 14 Wiesbaden, pp 417–419
- Schenck, A. 1860. Hymenoptera aculeata und Nachtrag zu Nassaus Aculeaten, Stettiner Entomologische Zeitung Volume 21, Stettin, pp 132–157 and pp 417–419
- Schenck, A. 1861. Zusätze und Berichtigungen zu der Beschreibung der nassauischen Grabwespen (Heft XII), Goldwespen (Heft XI), Bienen (Heft XIV) und Ameisen (Heft VIII und XI). Jahrbücher des Nassauischen Vereins für Naturkunde Volume 16, Wiesbaden, pp 137–207
- Schenck, A. 1863. Beiträge zur Kenntnis der nassauischen Cynipiden (Gallwespen) und ihrer Gallen. Jahrbücher des Nassauischen Vereins für Naturkunde Volume 17, Wiesbaden, pp 123–260
- Schenck, A. 1863. Naturgeschichte der Ameisen und Anleitung zur Bestimmung der nassauischen Arten Theil 1 1863 und Theil 2 1864. Programm des Gymnasiums zu Weilburg 1863 Weilburg, pp 1 – 39, pp 1 – 24
- Schenck, A. 1866. Verzeichnis der nassauischen Hymenoptera aculeata mit Hinzufügung der übrigen deutschen Arten. Berliner Entomologische Zeitschrift Volume 10, Berlin, pp 317–369
- Schenck, A. 1867. Zusätze zu dem Verzeichnis der nassauischen Hymenoptera aculeata. Berliner Entomologische Zeitschrift Volume 11, Berlin, p 156
- Schenck, A. 1868. Beschreibungen der nassauischen Bienen. Zweiter Nachtrag. Jahrbücher des Nassauischen Vereins für Naturkunde, Volume 21, Wiesbaden, pp 269–382
- Schenck, A. 1870. Die Goldwespen mit Bestimmungstabelle der nassauischen und kurzen Beschreibung der übrigen deutschen Arten. Programm des Gymnasiums zu Weilburg Weilburg, pp 1–17
- Schenck, A. 1871. Bemerkungen zu einigen der im Jahrg. 30 der Entom. Zeitung beschriebenen Bienen. Stettiner Entomologische Zeitung Volume 31, Stettin, pp. 104–107
- Schenck, A. 1871. Ueber einige schwierige Arten Andrena. Stettiner Entomologische Zeitung Volume 31, Stettin, pp. 407–414
- Schenck, A. 1872. Mehrere seltene, zum Theil neue Hymenopteren. In: Stettiner Entomologische Zeitung, Volume 32, Stettin, pp 253–257
- Schenck, A. 1873. Ueber einige streitige und zweifelhafte Bienenarten. In: Berliner Entomologische Zeitschrift, Volume 17, Berlin, pp 243–259
- Schenck, A. 1874. Aus der Bienenfauna Nassaus I. In: Berliner Entomologische Zeitschrift, Volume 18, Berlin, pp. 161–173 and 337-347
- Schenck, A. 1875. Aus der Bienenfauna Nassaus II. In: Deutsche Entomologische Zeitschrift, Volume 19, Berlin, S. 321-332
- Schenck, A. 1876. Über einige Bienen-Arten. In: Entomologische Nachrichten Volume 2, Putbus, pp 92–93
