= Gaetano Giulio Zumbo =

Italian sculptor

Gaetano Zumbo
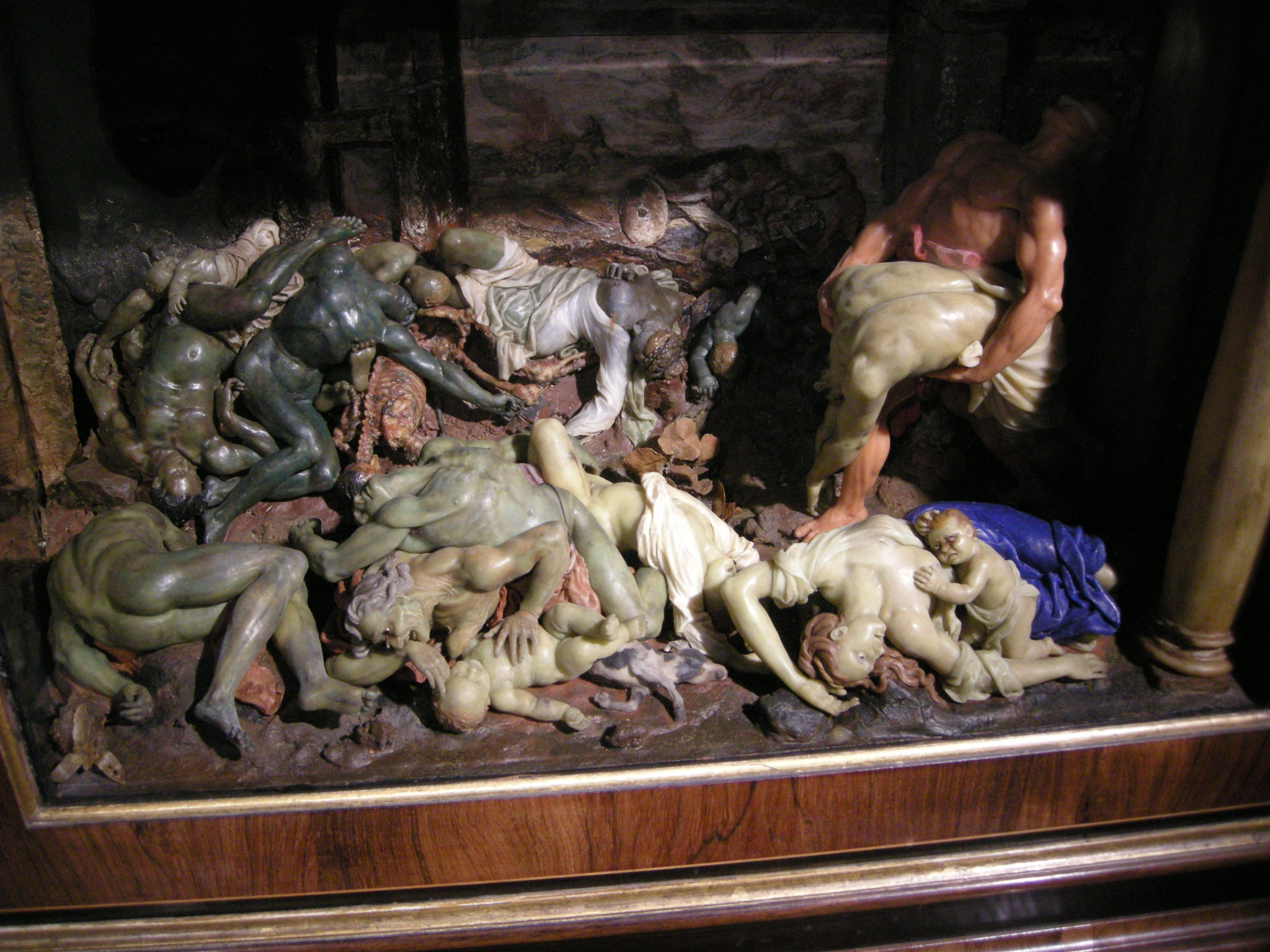
- Wax statues depicting effects of the plague, La Specola, Florence
- Born: 1656; Syracuse, Italy
- Died: 1701 (aged 44–45); Paris
- Known for: Sculpture, Ceroplasty
- Movement: Anatomical art

Gaetano Giulio Zumbo (1656–1701) was an Italian sculptor in wax or wax modeller of the Baroque era. His primary talents were not those generally considered as artistic but devoted to the creation of scientific models that were highly regarded as curiosity pieces in his time. He has also been called an anatomist.

He was born in Syracuse (Siracusa), Sicily, and showed an entirely self-taught inclination to the sculptural arts and anatomy. Not familiar with chiseling, he learned to model colored wax. This led to his patronage by the Grand Duke of Tuscany in Florence, for whom he created a series of five morbid models, almost a memento mori, depicting the progressive Corruption after death, beginning with a dying man, followed by a corpse, a corpse just starting to decompose, half corrupt, another completely corrupt, and finally eaten by worms. Once displayed in the Medici gallery, it was later transferred to the cabinet of natural history and zoological specimens (now displayed in the Section of the Natural History Museum called La Specola). Zumbo left Florence for Genoa. There he completed wax sculptures: a Nativity and a Deposition. He formed a partnership with a French surgeon, Guillaume Desnoues, and with him completed a number of anatomical studies, including a woman who died while in childbirth. With Denoues, he travelled to Paris, and at the Academy of Sciences presented a wax sculpture of the head with naturalistic depiction of veins, arteries, nerves, glands, and muscles.

Similar work by Giuseppe Salerno is in the Sansevero Chapel in Naples, Italy.

The central character of the novel Secrecy (2013) by Rupert Thomson, is based on Zumbo.
