= Ernst Heyne =

German entomologist

Ernst Heyne (1833-1905) was a German entomologist who specialised in Lepidoptera. He was the father of Alexander Heyne and Martin Heyne. The Heyne family were natural history dealers, booksellers and publishers in Berlin and London. Ernst Heyne was a friend and business associate of insect dealers Otto Staudinger and Andreas Bang-Haas.
