= Waldemar Fuchs =

German entomologist

Waldemar Fuchs (died 27 January 1876 in Nepal) was a German entomologist who specialised in Coleoptera. His collection is in La Specola in Florence.
