= Filippo Corridi =

Italian mathematician (1806-1877)

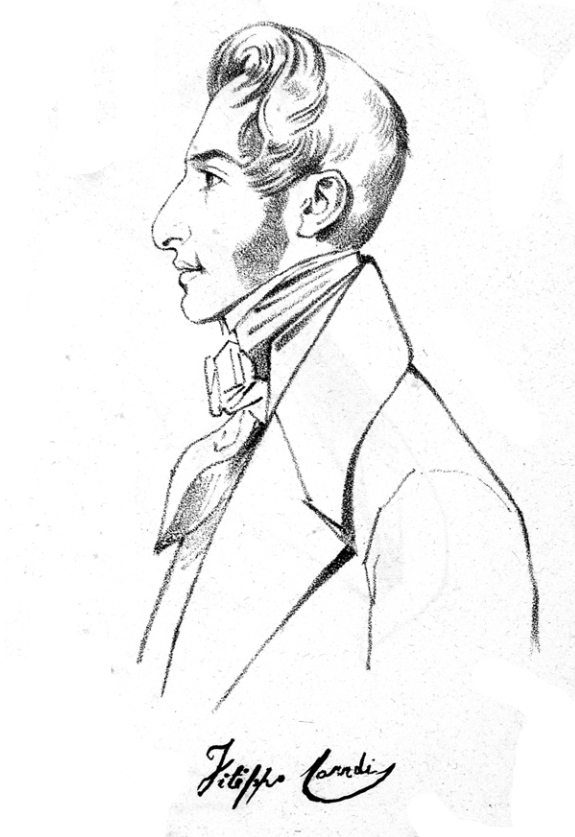
Profile by Francesco Boggi

Filippo Corridi (June 12, 1806 – January 2, 1877) was an Italian professor of mathematics and technical educator. He was a founder of the Istituto Tecnico in Tuscany in 1852 and served as its director until 1860. and was involved in popular education, writing several textbooks on didactics.

== Biography ==
Corridi was born in Livorno to trader Giuseppe and Giovanna Bianconi. He went to the Barnabite school at St. Sebastiano and was encouraged to join the school of the Royal Artillery and Marine Corps by the professor of mathematics Giuseppe Doveri. Corridi wrote an essay on the mechanics of solids and liquids in 1823 and received a scholarship to study at the University of Pisa. He graduated in 1821 and received the chair of arithmetic and geometry. He taught geometry and trigonometry, including spherical trigonometry. He wrote a textbook on algebra for geometry in 1834. He translated a French text on descriptive geometry in 1838. He also taught differential and integral calculus. He also promoted schools and kindergartens in Livorno and Pisa. With support of the Grand Duke, he was able to make a tour through Europe in 1840, meeting many scientists of the time. In 1839 he was secretary for the first Italian scientists congress. In 1843 he was preceptor for the son of the Grand Duke. Superintendent of the Florentice Society for Children's Schools. He was commissioner for Tuscany in the Great Exhibition of 1851 in London and the Paris Exposition in 1855.

In 1850 he was called to work on a school of arts and manufacture based on a Parisian model. He founded the Istituto Tecnico Toscano in 1853 which gave courses in technical topics including physics by Gilberto Govi. It had an impressive library and collection. The first graduates were produced in 1859 with training in surveying and geometry. He was however forced to move out due to changes in governance and regimes by 1860 and his position was taken by Vincenzo Amici. Among the accusations against him was the import of a guillotine from France in 1856. In 1883 the institute was renamed as the Istituto Tecnico Galileo Galilei and moved to a larger place in 1891.

Corridi married Orazio Hall, heir to a Tuscan industrialist. He published a number of books from the 1860s including on Italian typography, and printing technology.
