= Wilhelm Mink =

German entomologist

Wilhelm Mink (1807, Krefeld – 1883) was a German entomologist who specialised in Coleoptera and Hymenoptera, particularly of the Rhine. He was a teacher in Krefeld, and a corresponding member of the Netherlands Entomological Society from 1867. His collection is in the Municipal Museum of Annaberg-Buchholz in Saxony.
