= Fritz Rühl =

Fritz Rühl, also Roule, (1836 – 1893 in Zurich) was a Swiss entomologist. He was a professional insect collector and insect dealer who worked with the Berlin natural history dealers and publishers Alexander Heyne and Otto Staudinger. His Hymenoptera collections were sold to Paolo Magretti and are conserved in the Museo Civico di Storia Naturale di Genova. He supplied collections of Lepidoptera and Coleoptera from around the world to the Istituto Sperimentale per la Zoologia Agraria in Florence.

Rühl edited Die palaearktischen Grossschmetterlinge und ihre Naturgeschichte. Band 1. Leipzig, Ernst Heyne (1892-1895), a monograph with the Berlin insect dealer Max Bartel (1879-1914) and wrote scientific papers on Coleoptera.
