= Adolfo Targioni Tozzetti =

Italian entomologist (1823–1902)

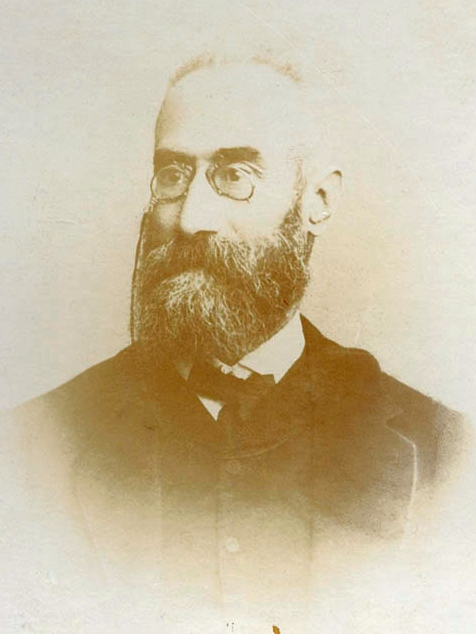
Adolfo Targioni Tozzetti

Adolfo Targioni Tozzetti (13 February 1823 in Florence – 18 September 1902) was an Italian entomologist who specialised in Sternorrhyncha. He was Professor of Botany and Zoology in Florence, associated with Museo di Storia Naturale di Firenze where his collection remains today at La Specola. He was especially interested in pest species, mainly mealybugs, scale insects and other pests that attack citrus and peaches. He described many new insect taxa.

== Biography ==
Tozzetti was the second son of lawyer and magistrate Giovanni Targioni Tozzetti and Elena Ferrati in family of scientists in Florence. His grandfather Ottaviano Targioni Tozzetti was a botanist as was his uncle Antonio Targioni Tozzetti. He studied medicine at Pisa and graduated in 1848. He attended lectures by Gaetano Savi, Paolo Savi and Pietro Savi and shifted to study the natural sciences. He practiced medicine at the Arcispedale di Santa Maria Nuova briefly including during the 1854-55 cholera epidemic in Viareggio. He was also appointed professor of botany and materia medica at the Santa Maria Nuova Hospital in 1854. He taught natural history from 1856 at the Tuscan Technical Institute under Filippo Corridi and then taught chemistry at the Agricultural Institute in Cascine from 1859. He then served in the Second War of Independence as a physician. He became a friend of Nino Bixio during this period. After the war he gave up working on botany and became a professor of the anatomy of invertebrates in a newly created institution called the Institute of Higher Studies founded by Cosimo Ridolfi in 1859. He collaborated on entomology with Ferdinando Piccioli. He visited the national exposition in London in 1861 and 1862 as a jury member. He was a member of the founding committee of La Società Entomologica Italiana created on 31 October 1869 and served as its first president. He specialized in agricultural entomology and took a special interest in the pests of grape and potato. Studies on Phylloxera occupied him for many years. Between 1871 and 1880 he was tasked with the study of crustacea collected by the corvette Magenta. He was involved in the Italian delegation for the Berlin International Exhibition of 1880. He served as vice president of the Georgofili Academy from 1884 to 1899. He was involved in several scientific societies including the Italian Geographical Society and served as a city councilor for Florence between 1868 and 1879. He gave advice on the planting of the city avenues and gardens.

Tozzetti married Anna Greiner (1846–1893) in 1878 and they had two children. After her death he married Anna's sister Clara Luisa (1841–1899) in 1897. In 1898 he donated the scientific archives of his uncle, father and grandfather to the National Central Library of Florence. In 1899 he suffered from hemiplegia and died three years later.

== Works ==
(partial list)

- 1867 Studii sulle Cocciniglie. Memorie della Società Italiana di Scienze Naturali. Milano 3: 1-87.
- 1868 (separate), 1869. Introduzione alla seconda memoria per gli studi sulle cocciniglie, e catalogo dei generi e delle specie della famiglia dei coccidi. Atti della Società Italiana di Scienze Naturali 11: 721–738.
- 1876. [Mytilaspis flavescens sp. n., on orange and citron, Italy. (?=M. anguinus Boisd.).] (In Italian.) Annali di Agricoltura. (Ministero di Agricoltura, Industria e Commercio). Firenze, Roma 1876: 1-36.
- 1879. [Diaspis blankenhornii.] Bollettino della Società Entomologica Italiana, Firenze 1879: 17, 32.
- 1879. Notizie e indicazioni sulla malattia del pidocchio della vite o della fillossera (Phylloxera vastatrix). Roma. Tipografia Eredi Botta 1879 (Estratto da "Annali di Agricoltura" 1879.Num.11). In 8°,
- 1881. Relazione intorno ai lavori della R. Stazione di Entomologia Agraria di Firenze per gli anni 1877–78. Parte scientifica. Fam. coccidi. Annali di Agricoltura. Ministero di Agricoltura, Industria e Commercio, Firenze, Roma No. 34: 134–161.
- 1884. Relazione intorno ai lavori della R. Stazione di Entomologia Agraria di Firenze per gli anni 1879–80. Article V. - omotteri. (In Italian). Annali di Agricoltura. Ministero di Agricoltura, Industria e Commercio, Firenze, Roma 1884 Nos 86-89: 383–414.
- 1886. Sull'insetto che danneggia i gelsi. Rivista di Bachicoltura (1885) 18: 1–3.
- 1886. Sull'insetto che danneggia i gelsi. Bollettino della Società Entomologica Italiana 19: 184–186.
- 1891 Animali ed insetti del tabacco in erba e del tabacco secco. Con 100 figure intercalate e 3 tavole litografiche. Firenze-Roma : Tip. dei fratelli Bencini. /0

== Other sources ==
- Anonym 1903: [Targioni Tozzetti, A.] Entomologist's Monthly Magazine (3) 39
- Bargagli, P. 1902: [Targioni Tozzetti, A.] Boll. Soc. geogr. ital. 34
- Conci, C. & Poggi, R. 1996: Iconography of Italian Entomologists, with essential biographical data. Mem. Soc. Ent. Ital. 75 159–382, 418 Fig.
