= Alexander Heyne =

German entomologist (1869–1927)

Alexander Heyne (1 July 1869, Leipzig – 1927, Berlin) was a German entomologist who specialised in Lepidoptera. He was the son of Ernst H. Heyne (1833-1905) also an entomologist as was Martin Heyne, Alexander's brother. The Heyne family were natural history dealers, booksellers, and publishers in Berlin and London. He contributed to Die palaearktischen Grossschmetterlinge und ihre Naturgeschichte. Band 1. Leipzig, Ernst Heyne (1892–1895) a monograph on butterflies edited by Fritz Rühl and the Berlin insect dealer Max Bartel (1879–1914).
