= Fritz Wagner (entomologist) =

Austrian entomologist (1900–1938)

Fritz Wagner (28 November 1873 – 17 June 1938) was an Austrian insect dealer and entomologist who specialised in the Lepidoptera. He worked in the natural history company of Winkler & Wagner of Vienna and made numerous expeditions to collect insect specimens.

Wagner was born in Szombathely and grew up in Vienna. He became interested in natural history at an early age. He became an insect dealer in Vienna from 1902 to 1905 as a partner in the firm Ortner Brothers & Co. (Vienna), from 1906 to 1924, was with the coleopterist Albert Johann Winkler (1881–1945) co-proprietor of Winkler & Wagner (Vienna) and also from 1918 owner of the company Fritz Wagner. The dealership specialised in Palaearctic especially Parnassius and Erebia and Lepidoptera of Central Asia and the Mediterranean area (collected on various personal expeditions). The company also sold specialist literature, insect nets, lenses, microscopes and other equipment. Wagner described nearly 100 lepidoptera species based on his collections made in Corfu (1907), Dalmatia and Bosnia (1907-1909), Herzegovina (1909), Tunis (1910), and Spain (1911). During World War I he served in Romania and Italy. After the war he collected in Sicily (1921), Dalmatia (1923-24), Spain (1925-26) and in the Pyrenees (1927).

== Works ==
Partial list

- Wagner, F. (1909): Einige neue Lepidopterenformen. Entomologische Zeitschrift 23 (4), pp. 17–19
- Wagner, Fritz (01. Nov 1931): Dritter (IV). Beitrag zur Lepidopteren-Fauna Inner-Anatoliens. Internationale Entomologische Zeitschrift 24(45), pp. [467-485, (47):487-493, 1 pl.
- Wagner, Fritz (17 Dec 1910): Zwei neue mitteleuropäische Lepidopteren-Formen. Internationale Entomologische Zeitschrift 4(38), pp. 208–209
- Wagner, Fritz (1913): Beitrag zur Kenntnis der Lepidopteren - Fauna des Iligebietes sowie des Sary-Dschas (Asia centr.). Ent. Mitt. 2, pp. [22-30, 50–62, 88–95, 112–116, 153–158, 185–190, 244–254, 285–288, 1 pl, 21 text-figs.
- Wagner, Fritz (1926): Einige neue Lepidopteren-Formen meiner Sammlung. Z. öst. EntVer. 11, pp. [25-26]
- Wagner, Fritz (1929): Weiterer Beitrag zur Lepidopteren-Fauna Inner-Anatoliens. Mitteilungen der Münchner Entomologischen Gesellschaft 19, pp. [1-28, 57–80, 175-206
- Wagner, Fritz (27 Dec 1919): Neue Lepidopteren-Formen meiner Sammlung. Internationale Entomologische Zeitschrift 13(20), pp. 156–160
