= Guillaume Desnoues =

Guillaume Desnoues (born 1650 - died 1735) was a French surgeon.

== Biography ==
He studied with Lescot, in 1680 he was received at the Academy of New Discoveries of Medicine by Nicolas de Blégny, he was forced into exile and, around 1691, was a surgeon in Genoa where he succeeded Lescot. He was the first surgeon of the hospital and linked with Gaetano Zumbo for the presentation of anatomical waxes, after his estrangement with the latter, he collaborated with François De la Croix who was an ivory sculptor.

Alfred Franklin notes in his Dictionary: "Desnoues having completed his work opened in the rue de Tournon, a museum made up of numerous wax pieces. One admired there above all a whole man, a girl about twelve years old, a woman nine month, "with the child still lying in the womb. Everything there is so just and natural that nothing is missing even in the smallest veins; the wax being sometimes red, sometimes white, blue, mixed, according to the various colors of the fleshy parts or veins of the human body [Nemeitz, Séjour de Paris, vol. I, p. 373]". Vigneul-Marville, who had seen all this, also praises it highly [Mixtures of History and Literature, t. III, p. 307.]. The admission price, quite expensive for the time, was fifty cents."

In 1704 he went to Bologna, Florence in 1706 to Rome where he presented his anatomical preparations. He did the same in Paris in 1717, in 1719 in London and in 1720 passed through Amsterdam.

== Bibliography ==
- Anatomies artificielles dont la principale composition est de cire colorée, ou Moyen prompt et facile de connaître la disposition intérieure et extérieure du corps humain tant de l'homme que de la femme, inventées par le sieur Guillaume Desnoues, in-18.
- De Laesione aponevroseon. Theses anatomico-chirurgicae quas... tueri conabitur Guillelmus-Raymundus Desnoues... Parisiis, in regiis chirurgorum scholis, die 17a martis..., Parisiis, typis P. A. Le Prieur, 1764.
- Arrêt du Parlement autorisant le chirurgien Guillaume Desnouës à faire pendant le jour des démonstrations anatomiques sur une figure de cire, Paris : imp. de Vve F. Muguet, 1712.
- Lettres de G. Desnoues professeur d'anatomie et de chirurgie de l'académie de Bologna et de M. Guglielmi, il est dédié à Philippe V, Roy d'Espagne et des Indes, Rome, «avec permission des Supérieurs», Antoine Rossi, imprimeur, 250 pages in-8°.
