= Società Entomologica Italiana =

La Società Entomologica Italiana, the Italian Entomological Society, is Italy's foremost society devoted to the study of insects. The society promotes applied entomology. Its past members have saved millions from deadly diseases such as malaria.

The society has two academic publications: Bollettino della Società Entomologica Italiana (1869-) and Memorie della Società Entomologica Italiana (1922-).

== History ==
The society was founded on 31 October 1869, near the Regio Museo di Storia Naturale, the Royal Natural History Museum (effectively "Museo zoologico de La Specola") in Florence. The founding members were Adolfo Targioni Tozzetti – the first president of the society – Giovanni Battista Grassi, Antonio Berlese, Filippo Silvestri, and Guido Grandi.

The Society had been promoted almost two years before by a group of Italian and other scientists from various institutions across Italy. On 1 January 1868, 21 members of the Comitato dei Promotori della Società Entomologica Italiana committee signed a manifesto coordinated by Alexander Enrico Haliday and four academic associates:

- Emilio Cornalia, then director of del Museo civico di Storia naturale di Milano, the author of works of applied entomology, such as "La Monografia del bombice del gelso" published in 1856;
- Giovanni Passerini, university professor of Botany at the Università di Parma;
- Paolo Savi, director of the "Museo zoologico dell'Università di Pisa", and author of "Ornitologia Toscana", Tuscany Birds (1827–1831), who had also promoted the first congress of Italian scientists, Primo Congresso degli Scienziati Italiani at Pisa in 1839 an author of notes on breeding Samia cynthia, an alternative silk producer of optimal quality "shantung"
- Achille Costa, holder of the first chair of Entomology and director of Museo zoologico dell'Università di Napoli. Adolfo Targioni Tozzetti and Pietro Stefanelli are also listed as one of the Comitato.

Fernandino Maria Piccioli was an editor.

The founding of the society was a part of the Risorgimento. In 1922, it moved to Genoa, to Museo Civico di Storia Naturale di Genova, where it is based.

La Società Entomologica Italiana collaborates with Unione Zoologica Italiana, the Italian Zoological Society in maintaining a website listing the Italian Fauna FaunaItalia.

== Notables ==
- Achille Costa - Vice President of the society (1879-1898)
- Raffaello Gestro - President of the society (1922-23)
- Giovanni Battista Grassi
- Alexander Henry Haliday
- Leonello Picco
- Camillo Rondani
- Ruggero Verity
