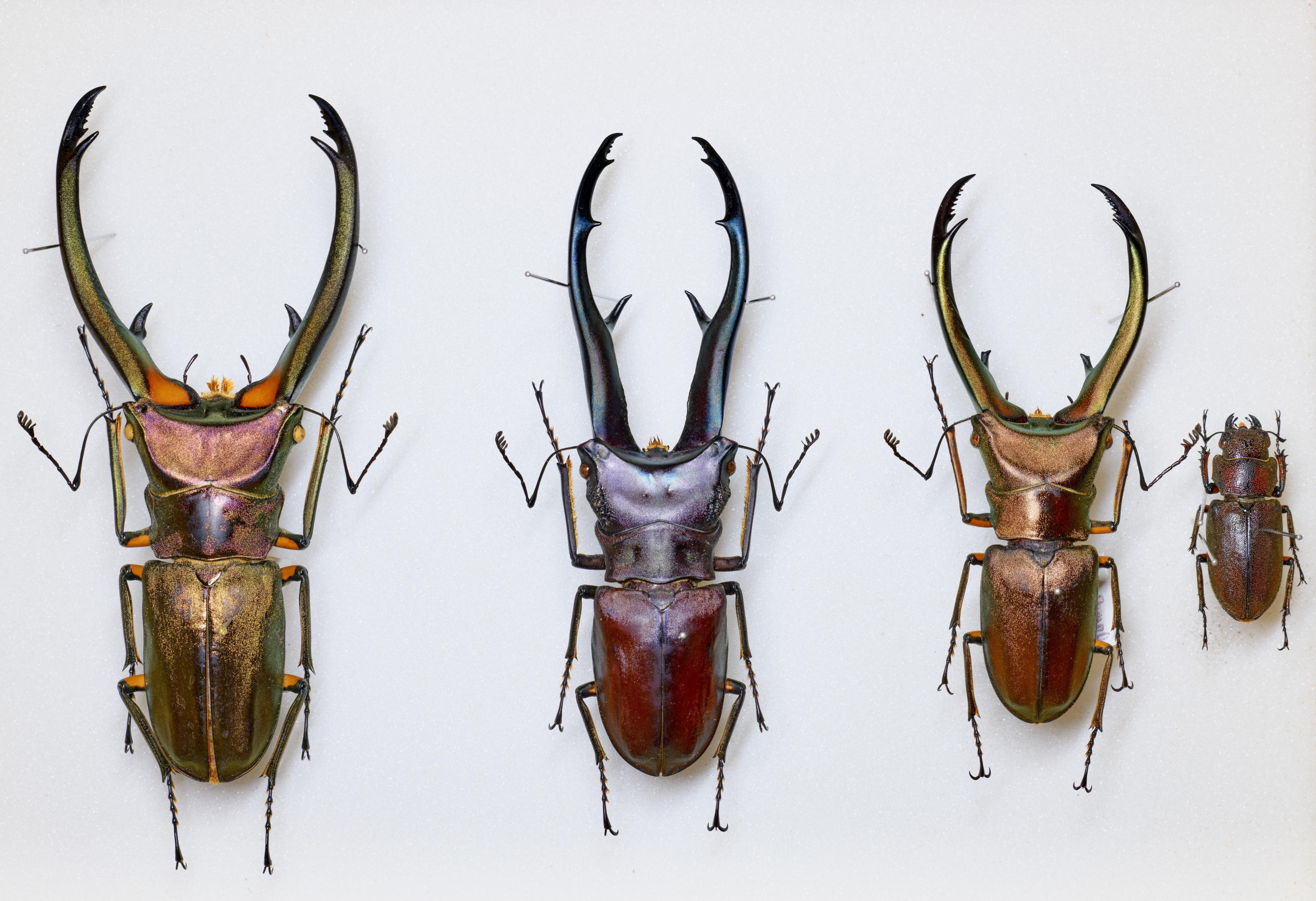
- From left to right: C. elaphus male, C. imperator male, C. e. truncatus pair.

Scientific classification
- Kingdom: Animalia
- Phylum: Arthropoda
- Class: Insecta
- Order: Coleoptera
- Suborder: Polyphaga
- Infraorder: Scarabaeiformia
- Family: Lucanidae
- Subfamily: Lucaninae
- Tribe: Cyclommatini
- Genus: Cyclommatus; Parry, 1863

Type species
- Cyclommatus metallifer (Boisduval, 1835)

Subgenera
- Cyclommatus Parry, 1863; Cyclommatinus Didier, 1927; Cyclommatellus Nagel, 1936

Diversity
- 134 species

= Cyclommatus =

Cyclommatus Temporal range: 33.2–0 Ma Oligocene to Recent

Genus of beetles

Cyclommatus is a genus of the family Lucanidae, also known as the stag beetle. The majority of the species from the genus Cyclommatus are located in Southeast Asia, though some species are found in China and Taiwan as well. The genus Cyclommatus also consists of three subgenera: Cyclommatus (Parry, 1863), Cyclommatinus (Didier, 1927) and Cyclommatellus (Nagel, 1936). Each subgenera contains 80, 24 and 3 species respectively. In total, the genus Cyclommatus consists of a total of 134 species, though more are still being discovered to this day.

The chief distinguishing characteristics of this genus are its impressive mandibles, which can sometimes be as long as its body, as well as its lustrous metallic exoskeleton, which can range from red, brown, green, purple, gold and a rarer blue-black. As such, beetles from the genus Cyclommatus can command a high price from collectors, with a demand for both live and dried specimens.

The largest species from this genus is Cyclommatus elaphus, with the largest recorded wild collected specimen being 109.0 mm (4.29 in) in length measured from the tip of the mandibles to the end of the elytra.

== Taxonomy ==
The first beetle from genus Cyclommatus was described by Jean Baptiste Boisduval in 1835 and was initially given the binomial name Lucanus metallifer. Later in 1863, in "A few Remarks upon Mr. James Thomson's Catalogue of Lucanidæ, published in the 'Annales de la Société Entomologique de France, 1862'," English entomologist Frederic Parry first suggests the name Cyclommmatus as the name of a new genus in the family Lucanidae, and this has been the name of this genus ever since.

Different sources place the genus Cyclommatus under the tribe Cladognathini (Parry, 1870), or Cyclommatini (Maes, 1992).

=== Evolution ===
The family Lucanidae is a monophyletic group in which it evolved from a unique ancestor or group of ancestors. Using the BEAST software, which stands for Bayesian Evolutionary Analysis Sampling Trees to model the genetic divergence in Lucanidae, the genus Cyclommatus is thought to have diverged around 50-20 million years ago, with the average being 33.2 million years ago. The temporal range given above is with a 95% highest posterior density (HPD) confidence interval.

=== Distribution ===
Cyclommatus is found in many parts of the world, including:

Afghanistan, Bhutan, China, India, Indonesia, Laos, Malaysia, Myanmar, Nepal, Papua New Guinea, Philippines, Singapore, Solomon Islands, Taiwan, Thailand, Vietnam and AC.

== Description ==
Male beetles of genus Cyclommatus are generally larger than females of the same species, and exhibit brighter and lustrous exoskeletons compared to females. Some species of this genus are also colour polymorphic and as such exhibit a wide variety of different colours within the same species, which can range from red, brown, green, purple, gold and a rarer blue-black.

Males of a larger size, or major males, relative to their respective species in this genus exhibit enlarged mandibles. These enlarged mandibles are used for scratching the surfaces of bark to allow the beetle to feed on tree sap, or to compete with other males for mates. Males with larger mandibles are more likely to win these fights, which often involves throwing the competitor off of branches and leaves.

Due to their smaller mandibles and need to chew through decaying wood to lay eggs, female beetles of this genus were thought to have a greater biting force. However, the biting force of the males can in fact exceed the biting force of the females, for example, the biting force of Cyclommatus metallifer males was found to be 3 times that of females.

== Life cycle ==
The life cycle of beetles in genus Cyclommatus share many characteristics of that of other stag beetles, starting with an egg, three larval stages, pupation and finally eclosion.

After mating, female beetles use their smaller mandibles better adapted to cutting wood to create tunnels within decaying logs in which eggs are laid. The beetle larva once hatched from its egg, experiences three larval stages: the first, second and third instar. The transition between each of the instars requires the larva to moult, as each larva of each successive instar has a larger chitin head. For members of genus Cyclommatus, the larval stage can last a few months to up to one and a half to two years for large individuals. During this time, larva mainly subsist on decaying logs.

Once the larva have received adequate nutrition, the larva then creates a pupal chamber in which it lies in a pre-pupal state with limited mobility, creating its pupa beneath its larval skin. On completing its pupa, the larva then sheds its skin and fills the entirety of the pupa with hemolymph. When the pupa is filled, the soft white pupa gradually darkens to a brown colour and hardens.

As the beetle inside the pupa matures, the beetle within becomes more prominent, for example, the eyes of the beetle may be seen through the pupal walls. When this occurs, the beetle will usually eclose a few days later.

As adults, beetles of genus Cyclommatus generally subsist on tree sap, and typically do not have a lifespan of any longer than one year.

== Pet trade ==
Large specimens of these genus can command high prices upwards of $700 USD due to the lustrous metallic bodies that the beetles possess. Collectors buy both live and dried specimens, with many of the live specimens being exported to countries such as Japan and Taiwan, which has a large market for keeping beetles as exotic pets. Popular beetle species from this genus include: Cyclommatus elaphus, Cyclommatus metallifer, Cyclommatus monguilloni and Cyclommatus imperator.

When kept in captivity, beetles of this genus can consume mangos, bananas and a variety of fruits in addition to purpose beetle jellies as adults, whilst beetle breeders in Japan have experimented with many foods for the larva, such as fermented wood, decaying logs and sawdust inoculated with mycelium. This is done in order to maximise the growth during the larval period, as all growth occurs during the larval period and thus the adult size is dependent on the availability of nutrients to the larva.

The most suitable type of food for beetle larva of this genus differs between species, but beetle larva of this genus generally subsist on white rotten wood from different species of tree or flake soil, much like other beetle larva of family Lucanidae.

== Species ==
The genus Cyclommatus comprises:

- Cyclommatus alagari DeLisle, 1968
- Cyclommatus asahinai Kurosawa, 1974
- Cyclommatus assamensis Seguy, 1955
- Cyclommatus bicolor Bomans, 1991
- Cyclommatus canaliculatus Ritsema, 1891
  - Cyclommatus canaliculatus canaliculatus Ritsema, 1891
  - Cyclommatus canaliculatus consanguineus Boileau, 1898
  - Cyclommatus canaliculatus freygesseneri Ritsema, 1892
  - Cyclommatus canaliculatus ramlii T.Wakatake et K.Sakamaki, 2002
- Cyclommatus chewi Mizunuma, 1994
- Cyclommatus cupreonitens Boileau, 1901
- Cyclommatus dehaani Westwood, 1842
- Cyclommatus dooseokyii Kim, 2018
- Cyclommatus elaphus Gestro, 1881
- Cyclommatus elsae Kriesche, 1921
- Cyclommatus eximius Möllenkamp, 1909
- Cyclommatus faunicolor Westwood, 1844
- Cyclommatus gestroi Nagel, 1931
- Cyclommatus giraffa Mollenkamp, 1904
- Cyclommatus imperator imperator Boileau, 1905
- Cyclommatus imperator monguilloni Lacroix, 1981
- Cyclommatus imperator splendidus Schenk, 2000
- Cyclommatus martinii Lacroix, 1989
- Cyclommatus metallifer (Boisduval, 1835)
- Cyclommatus modigliani Ritsema, 1899
- Cyclommatus multidentatus Westwood, 1848
- Cyclommatus pahagensis Nagel, 1936
- Cyclommatus pasteuri Ritsema, 1891
- Cyclommatus vanrooni Oberthür & Houlbert, 1914
- Cyclommatus zuberi Waterhouse, 1876
