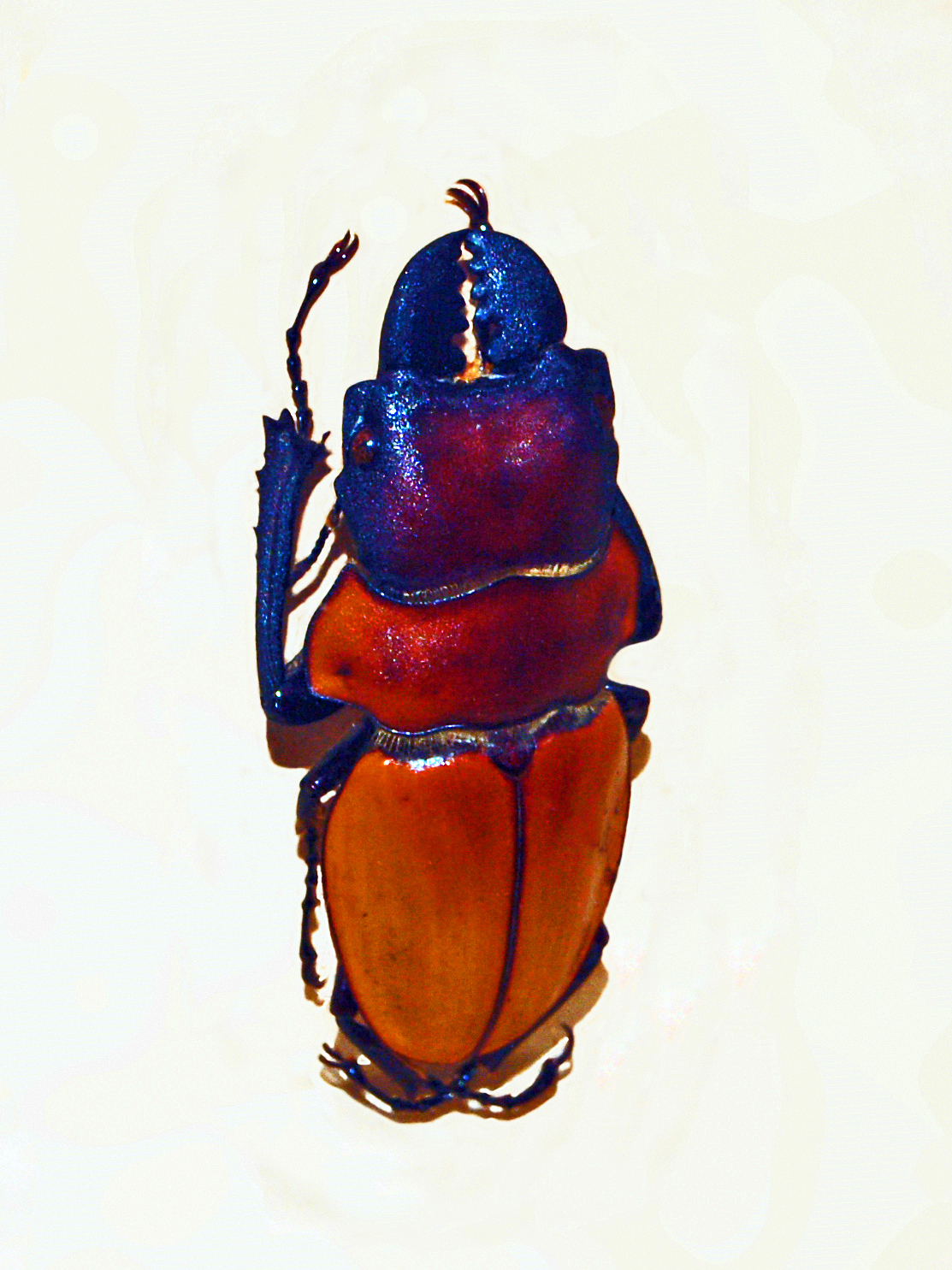
- Odontolabis lowei from Sumatra

Scientific classification
- Kingdom: Animalia
- Phylum: Arthropoda
- Clade: Pancrustacea
- Class: Insecta
- Order: Coleoptera
- Suborder: Polyphaga
- Infraorder: Scarabaeiformia
- Family: Lucanidae
- Genus: Odontolabis
- Species: O. lowei

Binomial name
- Odontolabis lowei Parry, 1873

Synonyms
- Odontolabis sommeri lowei Parry, 1873

= Odontolabis lowei =

Species of beetle

Odontolabis lowei is a species of beetles belonging to the family Lucanidae.

== Description ==
Odontolabis lowei can reach a length of about 50–55 millimetres (2.0–2.2 in).

== Distribution ==
This species can be found in Borneo, Sumatra and Java.
