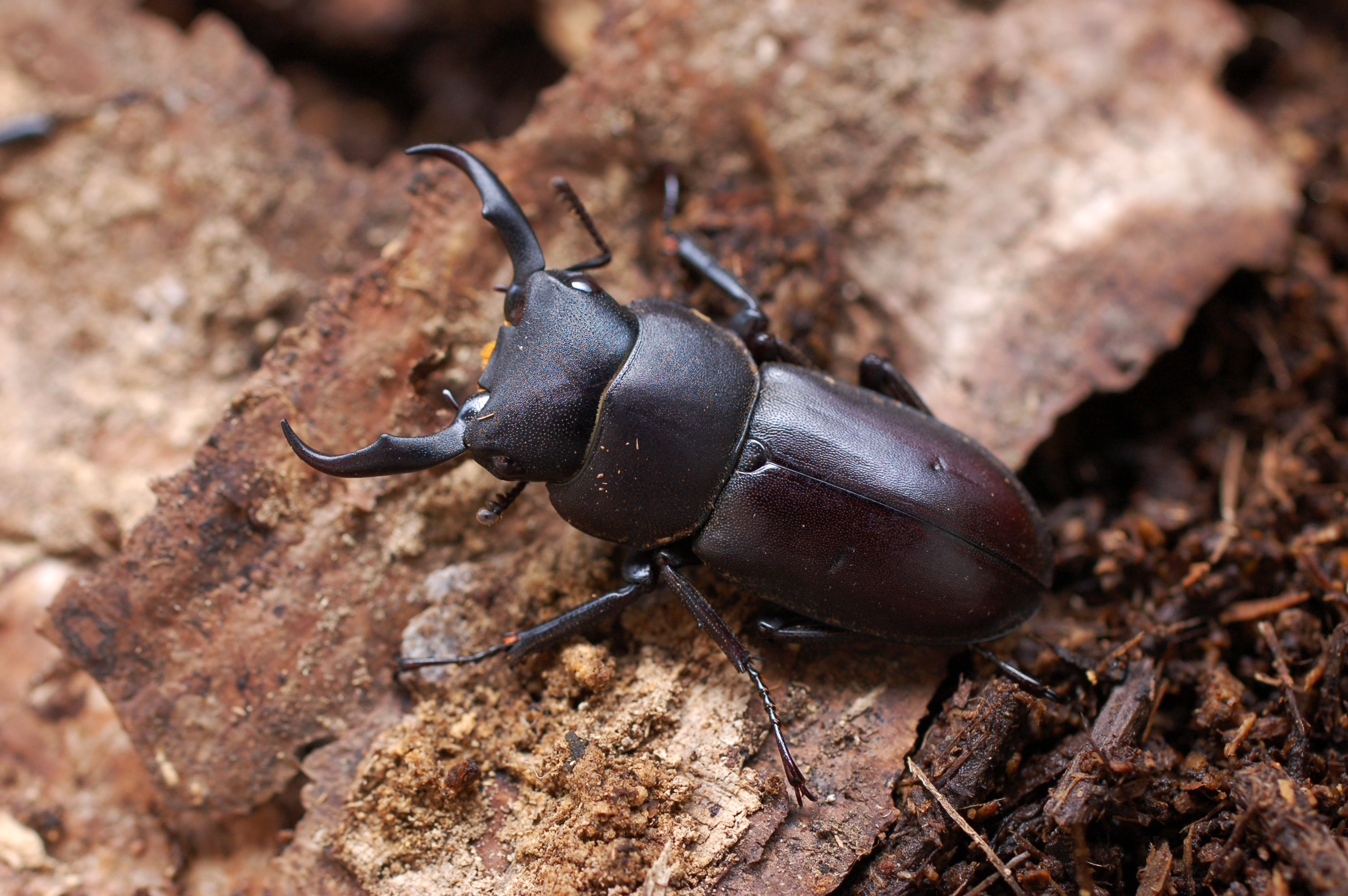

Scientific classification
- Kingdom: Animalia
- Phylum: Arthropoda
- Clade: Pancrustacea
- Class: Insecta
- Order: Coleoptera
- Suborder: Polyphaga
- Infraorder: Scarabaeiformia
- Family: Lucanidae
- Genus: Dorcus
- Species: D. rectus

Binomial name
- Dorcus rectus (Motschulsky, 1857)

= Dorcus rectus =

Species of beetle

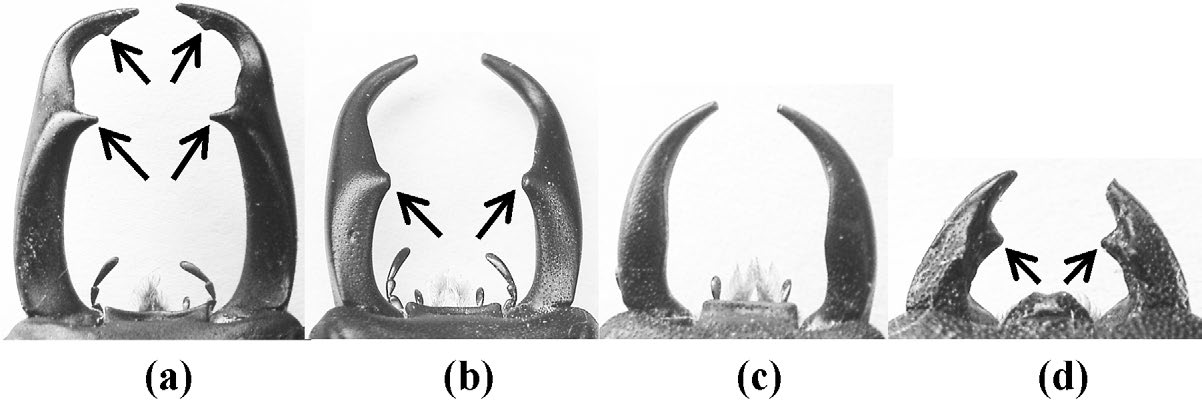
(a) Male mandibles with two pairs of teeth (arrows). (b) Male mandibles with one pair of teeth (arrows). (c) Male mandibles with no teeth. (d) Female mandibles with one pair of teeth (arrows).

Dorcus rectus, the little stag beetle, is a species of beetles in the family Lucanidae. It can be found in China(Liaoning), Korea, Japan, Russia. These beetles have a distinctive red shell that separates them from Dorcus curvidens. Males of this species have been observed to have mandible trimorphism, a characteristic that has only been described in two species of Lucanidae—with the other one being Odontolabis cuvera—"and a small number of other invertebrates" as of 2017. The mandibles are used by males as weapons.
