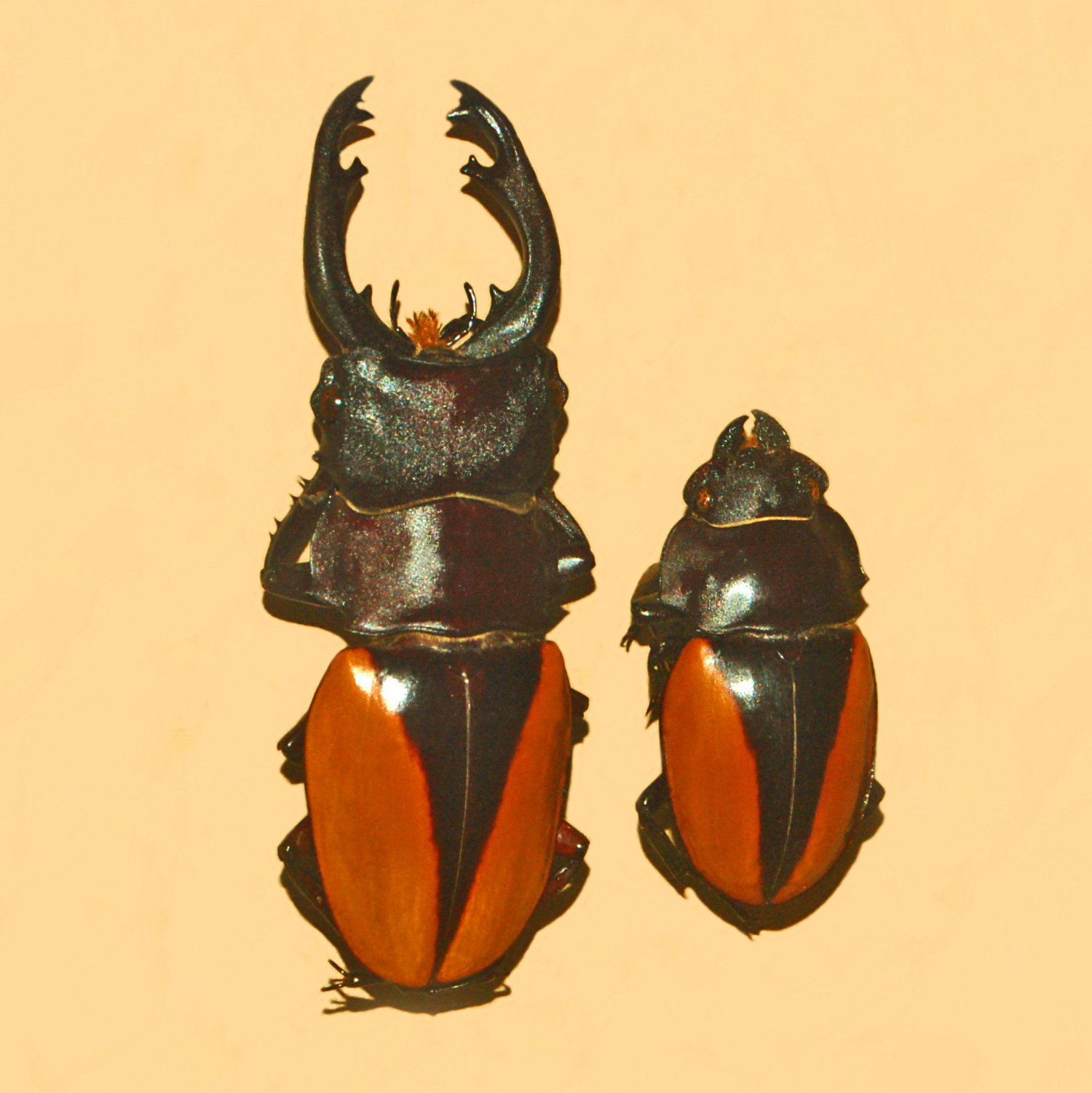
- Odontolabis cuvera, male and female. Museum specimen

Scientific classification
- Kingdom: Animalia
- Phylum: Arthropoda
- Clade: Pancrustacea
- Class: Insecta
- Order: Coleoptera
- Suborder: Polyphaga
- Infraorder: Scarabaeiformia
- Family: Lucanidae
- Genus: Odontolabis
- Species: O. cuvera

Binomial name
- Odontolabis cuvera Hope, 1842

= Odontolabis cuvera =

Species of beetle

Odontolabis cuvera, the golden stag beetle, is a beetle of the family Lucanidae, stag beetles.

== Etymology ==
The Latin species name Cuvera comes from a mythical king of riches (Kubera or "Kuvera") who lived in the Himalayas.

== List of subspecies ==
- Odontolabis cuvera alticola Möllenkamp, 1902
- Odontolabis cuvera boulouxi Lacroix, 1984
- Odontolabis cuvera cuvera Hope, 1842 (Bhutan, India, Nepal)
- Odontolabis cuvera fallaciosa Boileau, 1901 (China, Laos, Thailand, Vietnam)
- Odontolabis cuvera gestroi Boileau, 1902 (India, Myanmar)
- Odontolabis cuvera lunulata Lacroix, 1984
- Odontolabis cuvera mandibularis Möllenkamp, 1909
- Odontolabis cuvera sinensis Westwood, 1848 (China)

== Description ==
Odontolabis cuvera can reach a length (mandibles included) of about 43–90 millimetres (1.7–3.5 in) in male, of about 41–51 millimetres (1.6–2.0 in) in females. Moreover, males have a conspicuously elongated and large pair of mandibles. The basic color of the body is black. Elytra have broad orange margins on the outer edge. The female closely resembles the male in coloration but it lacks long mandibles.

The remarkably disparity between male and females (sexual dimorphism) evolved through sexual selection for securing mating females. The males have also three morphological forms with variations in the size of their mandibles. These three alternative phenotypes (male trimorphism) in the types of male weapons are considered conditional reproductive strategies. In Lucanidae, there has only been two species described with this trimorphic characteristic as of 2017, with the other one being Dorcus rectus.

In the subspecies Odontolabis cuvera sinensis elytra are almost completely black, with a small orange border. These beetles can reach a length of about 80 millimetres (3.1 in).

== Life cycle ==
The females lay their eggs into leaf litter substrate and rotten wood. Larvae build their cave system and stay inside it, feeding for several years on rotting wood.

== Distribution ==
This beetle is native to southeast Asia and it is present in Bhutan, China, India, Laos, Myanmar, Nepal, Thailand, Vietnam.

== Gallery ==
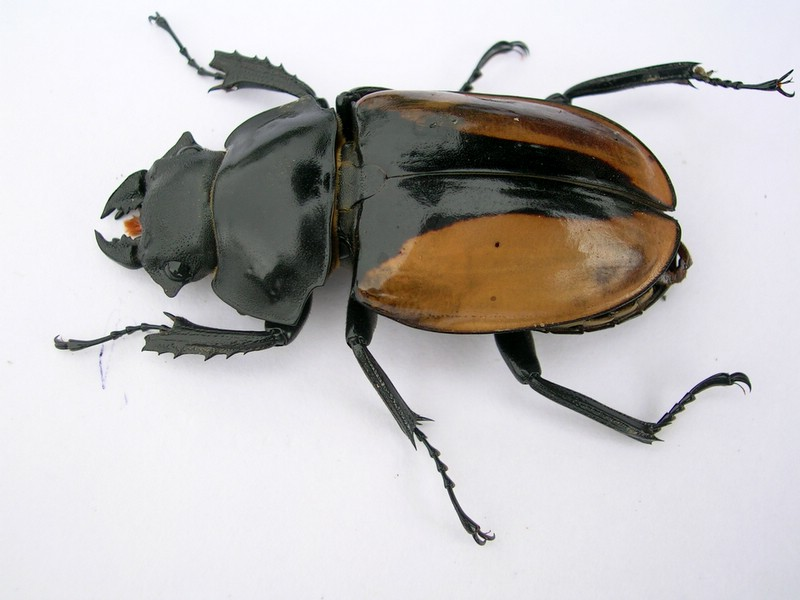
Odontolabis cuvera from Talakaveri, Coorg

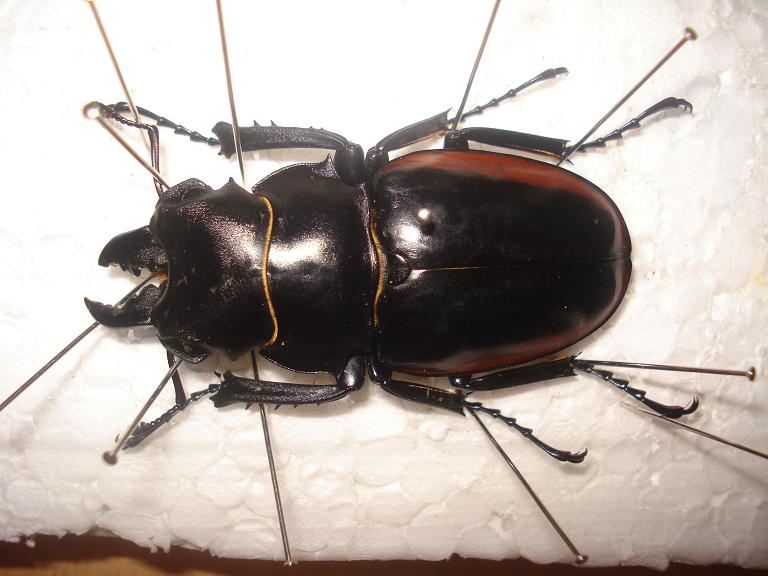
Odontolabis cuvera sinensis. A 65 mm long male.

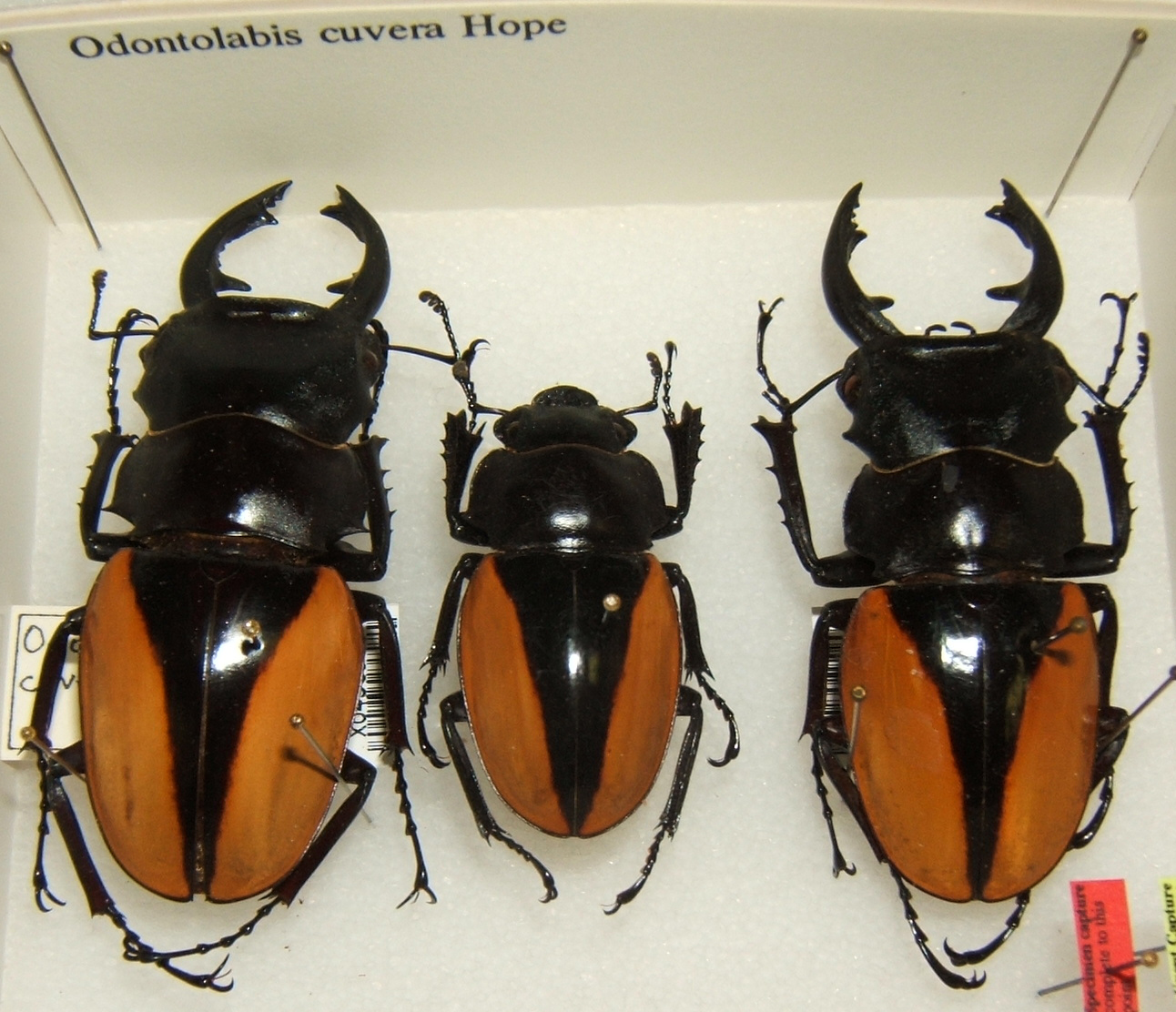
Odontolabis cuvera. Adult from the Texas A&M University Insect Collection in College Station

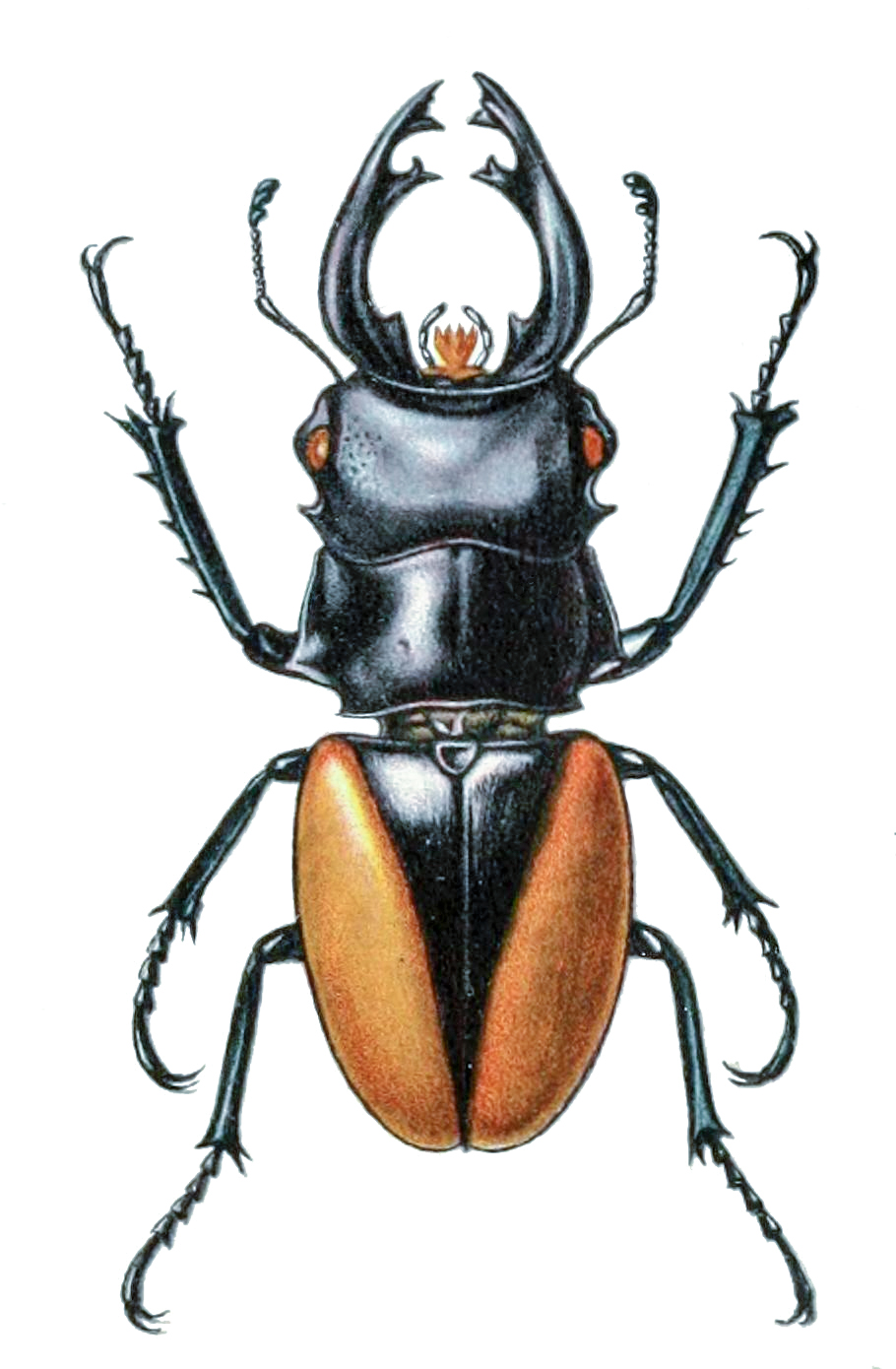
Odontolabis cuvera. Illustration from the Journal of the Bombay Natural History Society

== Monograph ==
- Lacroix, J.-P., 1984 - The Beetles of the World, volume 4, Odontolabini I (Lucanidae) - Genera Chalcodes, Odontolabis, Heterochtes. 1984, 175 pg.
