= Jacqueline Schaeffer =

French psychoanalyst (1934–2026)

- Born: Jacqueline de Lisle; 1934
- Died: 4 January 2026 (aged 91)
- Occupation: Psychoanalyst

Jacqueline Schaeffer (French: [ʒaklin ʃɛfɛʁ]; née de Lisle; 1934 – 4 January 2026) was a French psychoanalyst.

== Life and career ==
Born in 1934, Schaeffer was the daughter of polytechnician and entymologist Melchior de Lisle and the organist Christiane de Lisle. In 1962, she married composer Pierre Schaeffer, who was a key figure in musique concrète. The couple had one daughter named Justine.

She was an honorary member of the Paris Psychoanalytic Society and served on the editing committee of Revue française de psychanalyse from 1988 to 1997. She taught adult psychoanalysis at the Institut de psychanalyse de Paris and at the Sainte-Anne Hospital Center. She also oversaw psychoanalytic relations at the Observatoire de la petite sirène.

Schaeffer died on 4 January 2026, at the age of 91.

== Distinctions ==
- Prix Maurice Bouvet (1987)

== Selected works ==
=== Books ===
- Devenir psychanalyste (2001)
- The Universal Refusal (A Psychoanalytic Exploration of the Feminine Sphere and its Repudiation) (2011)
- Qu'est la sexualité devenue ? De Freud à aujourd'hui (2019)
- Le refus du féminin : la Sphinge et son âme en peine (2022)
- Le féminin. Un sexe autre (2022)

=== Articles ===
- "Quel retour d'âge ? Début de la fin ou fin du début ?" (2005)
- "Le fil rouge du sang de la femme" (2005)
- "Cent ans après les Trois essais, que reste-t-il des trois scandales ?" (2008)
- "Les portes des mères" (2011)
- "Hystérie : le risque du féminin" (2014)
- "Le tabou de la frigidité. Le silence des alcôves" (2012)
- "Le risque de la perte. Angoisses et dépression au féminin" (2013)
- "Du non-père de la horde au père amant et au père œdipien" (2013)
- "La nuit des Mères Ombre de l’homosexualité féminine" (2015)
- "Au-delà du phallique : le féminin" (2016)
- "Amour, passion et emprise sexuelle" (2018)
- "L'avenir des confusions" (2022)
