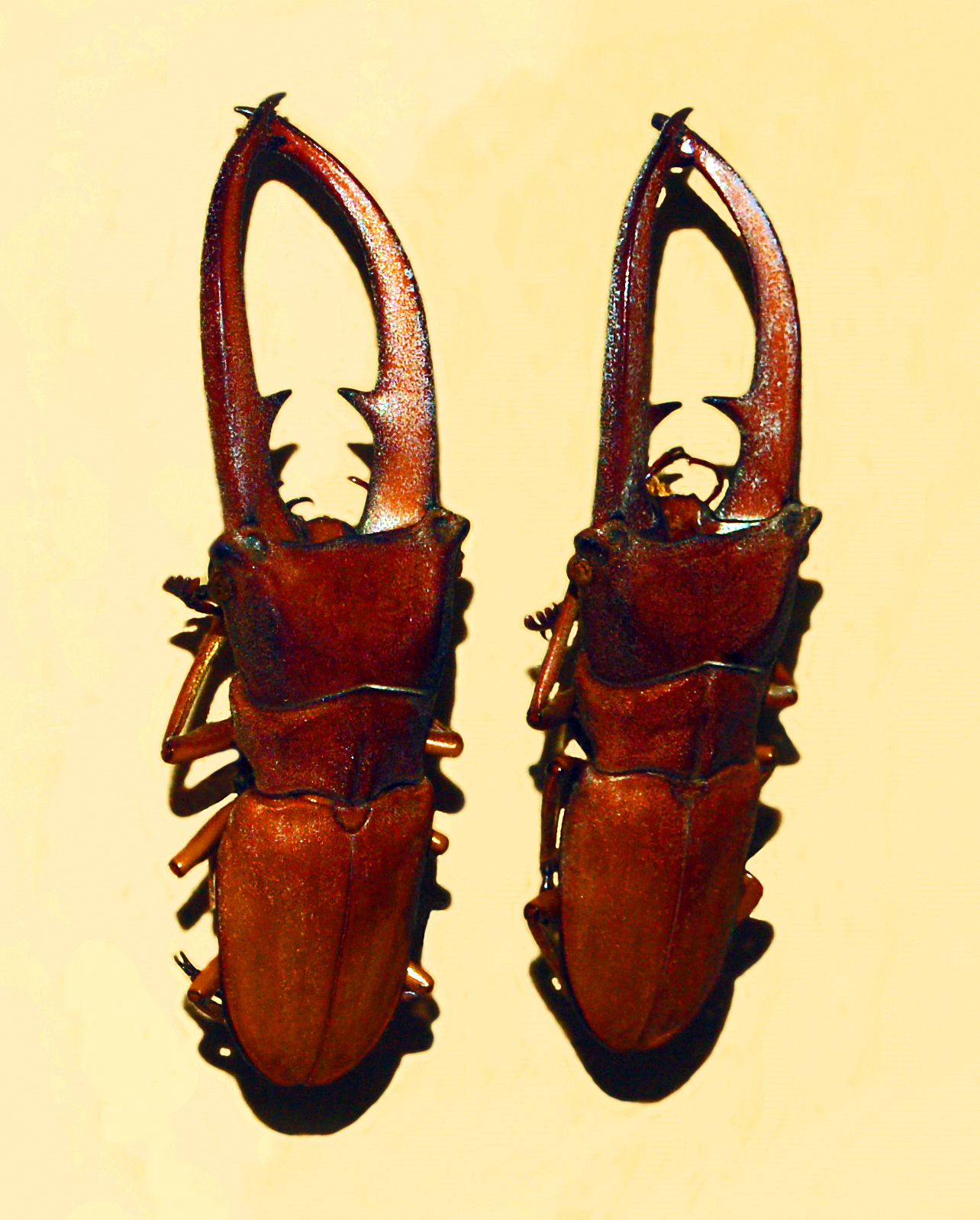
- Cyclommatus canaliculatus from Island of Nias

Scientific classification
- Kingdom: Animalia
- Phylum: Arthropoda
- Clade: Pancrustacea
- Class: Insecta
- Order: Coleoptera
- Suborder: Polyphaga
- Infraorder: Scarabaeiformia
- Family: Lucanidae
- Genus: Cyclommatus
- Species: C. canaliculatus

Binomial name
- Cyclommatus canaliculatus Ritsema, 1891

= Cyclommatus canaliculatus =

Species of beetle

Cyclommatus canaliculatus is a species of beetles belonging to the family Lucanidae.

== Description ==
Cyclommatus canaliculatus reaches a length of about 28–53 millimetres (1.1–2.1 in) in males, about 20 millimetres (0.79 in) in females. The basic colour is dark red-brown or blackish. The mandibles are long and their outer margin is straight, while their inner margins are armed at about one third of its length with a strong tooth. The mandibles are finely granulated and sub-opaque, but the apical portion is glossy. The upper side of the head shows a large flattened depression. The sides of the prothorax have an angular tooth. The elytra are covered with punctures.

== Distribution ==
This species can be found in Malaysia, Borneo, Java and Nias (Indonesia).

== Subspecies ==
- Cyclommatus canaliculatus canaliculatus Ritsema, 1891
- Cyclommatus canaliculatus consanguineus Boileu, 1898
- Cyclommatus canaliculatus freygessneri Ritsema, 1892
- Cyclommatus canaliculatus infans de Lisle, 1970
