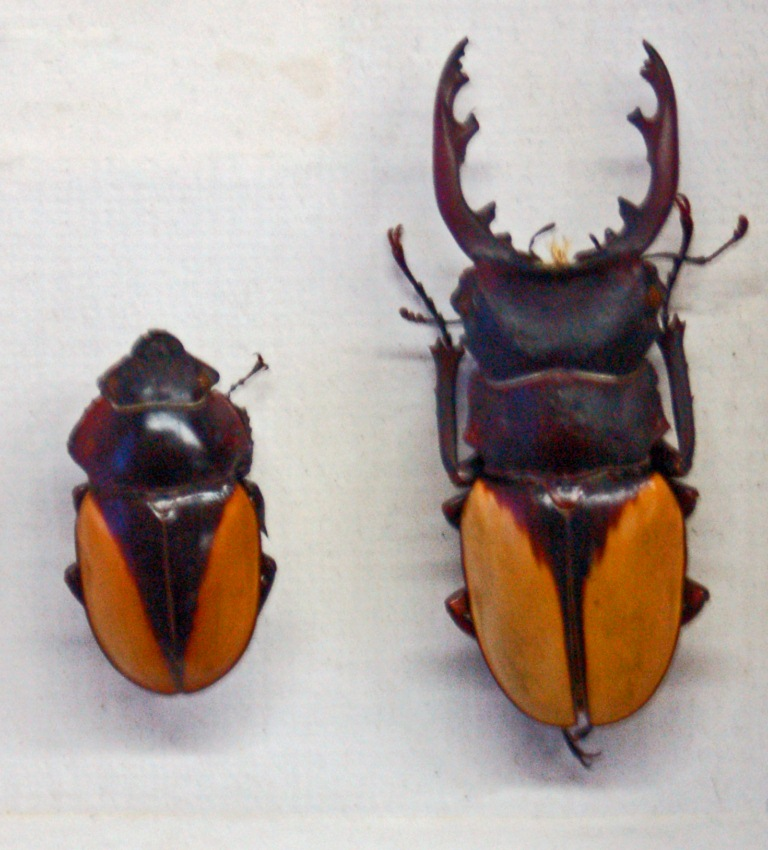
- Odontolabis delesserti, adult female and male from National Museum (Prague)

Scientific classification
- Kingdom: Animalia
- Phylum: Arthropoda
- Clade: Pancrustacea
- Class: Insecta
- Order: Coleoptera
- Suborder: Polyphaga
- Infraorder: Scarabaeiformia
- Family: Lucanidae
- Genus: Odontolabis; Hope, 1842

= Odontolabis =

Genus of beetles

Odontolabis is a genus of beetles belonging to the family Lucanidae.

== Description ==
The species of the genus Odontolabis are large (males up to 9 cm), oblong and shiny. Usually males have more or less enlarged head and jaws. The head and the pronotum usually are black, while elytra are often more or less brownish or yellowish. In some species the shape of the male's jaws have several different forms (polymorphism).

The species of this genus are native to Southeast Asia.

== List of selected species ==
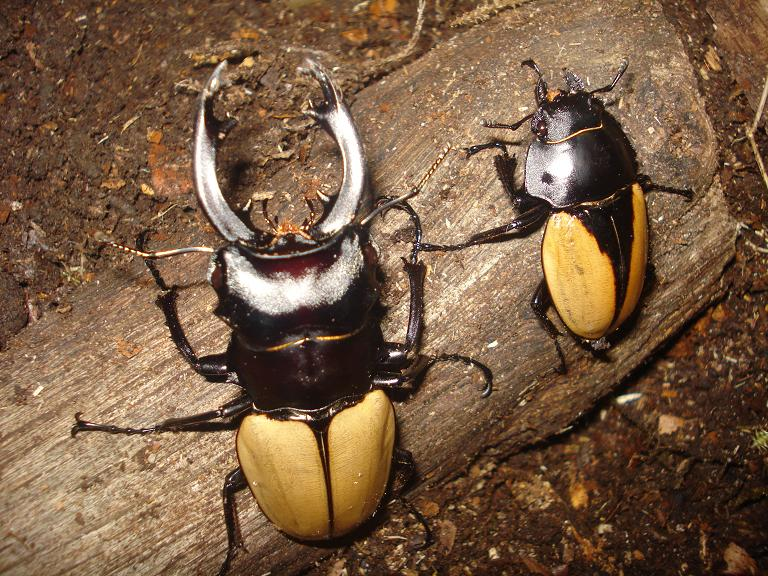
Odontolabis mouhotii mouhotii male and female

There are approximately 61 species and subspecies in this genus:

- Odontolabis alces (Fabricius, 1775) - Philippines
- Odontolabis antilope von Rothenburg, 1901 - Borneo, Sumatra
- Odontolabis brookeana (Vollenhoven, 1861) - Borneo, Sumatra, Java
- Odontolabis burmeisteri (Hope, 1841) - India
- Odontolabis camela (Olivier, 1789) - Philippines
- Odontolabis castelnaudi Parry, 1862 - Malaya, Borneo, Sumatra
- Odontolabis cuvera Hope, 1842 – India, Vietnam
- Odontolabis dalmani (Hope & Westwood, 1845) - Sumatra
- Odontolabis delesserti (Guérin-Méneville, 1843) - India
- Odontolabis eremicola Mollenkamp, 1905 - Borneo
- Odontolabis femoralis Waterhouse, 1887 – Thailand, Borneo
- Odontolabis gazella (Fabricius, 1787) - Philippines, Malaya, Borneo, Sumatra
- Odontolabis hitam Nagai, 1986 - Sumatra
- Odontolabis imperialis Mollenkamp, 1904 - Philippines, Sarawak, Sabah
- Odontolabis lacordairei (Vollenhoven, 1861) - Sumatra
- Odontolabis latipennis (Hope & Westwood, 1845) - Malaya
- Odontolabis leuthneri Boileau, 1897 - Borneo
- Odontolabis lowei Parry, 1873 - Borneo, Sumatra, Java
- Odontolabis ludekingi (Vollenhoven, 1861) – Malaya, Sumatra
- Odontolabis macrocephala Lacroix, 1984 - Thailand, Vietnam
- Odontolabis micros de Lisle, 1970 - Sulawesi
- Odontolabis mollenkampi Fruhstorfer, 1898 - Sumatra
- Odontolabis mouhoti Parry, 1864 - Indochina
- Odontolabis pareoxa Bomans & Ratti, 1973 - India
- Odontolabis picea Bomans, 1986 - Sumatra
- Odontolabis platynota (Hope & Westwood, 1845) - Burma, Laos, Vietnam
- Odontolabis quadrimaculata Kriesche, 1920 - Sumatra
- Odontolabis relucens Mollenkamp, 1900 - Sumatra
- Odontolabis sinensis (Westwood, 1848) - Southwestern China
- Odontolabis siva (Hope & Westwood, 1845) – India, Taiwan, Malaya, Viet Nam
- Odontolabis sommeri Parry, 1862 – Borneo, Sumatra
- Odontolabis spectabilis Boileau, 1902 - Sumatra
- Odontolabis stevensi Thomson, 1862 – Sulawesi, Timor
- Odontolabis versicolor (Didier, 1931) - India
- Odontolabis vollenhoveni Parry, 1864 - Borneo
- Odontolabis wollastoni Parry, 1864 – Malaya, Sumatra
- Odontolabis yasuokai Mizunuma, 1994 - Sumatra

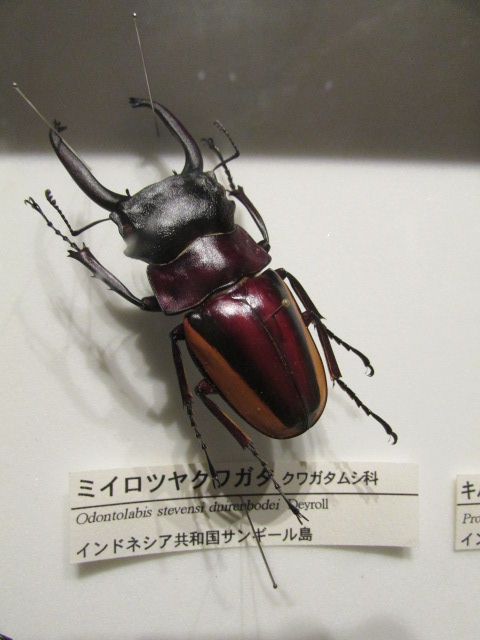
Odontolabis stevensi
