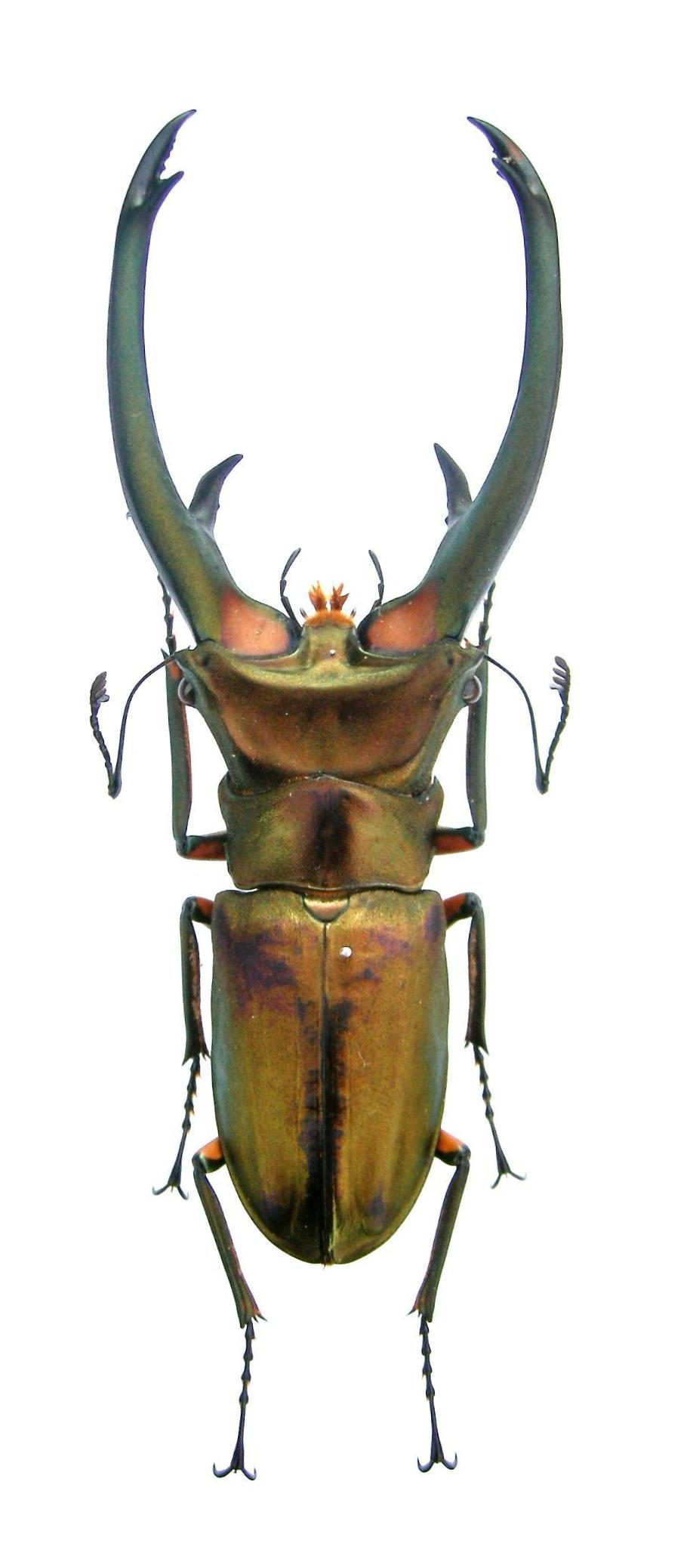
- Golden green Cyclommatus elaphus male

Scientific classification
- Domain: Eukaryota
- Kingdom: Animalia
- Phylum: Arthropoda
- Class: Insecta
- Order: Coleoptera
- Suborder: Polyphaga
- Infraorder: Scarabaeiformia
- Family: Lucanidae
- Genus: Cyclommatus
- Species: C. elaphus

Binomial name
- Cyclommatus elaphus Gestro, 1881
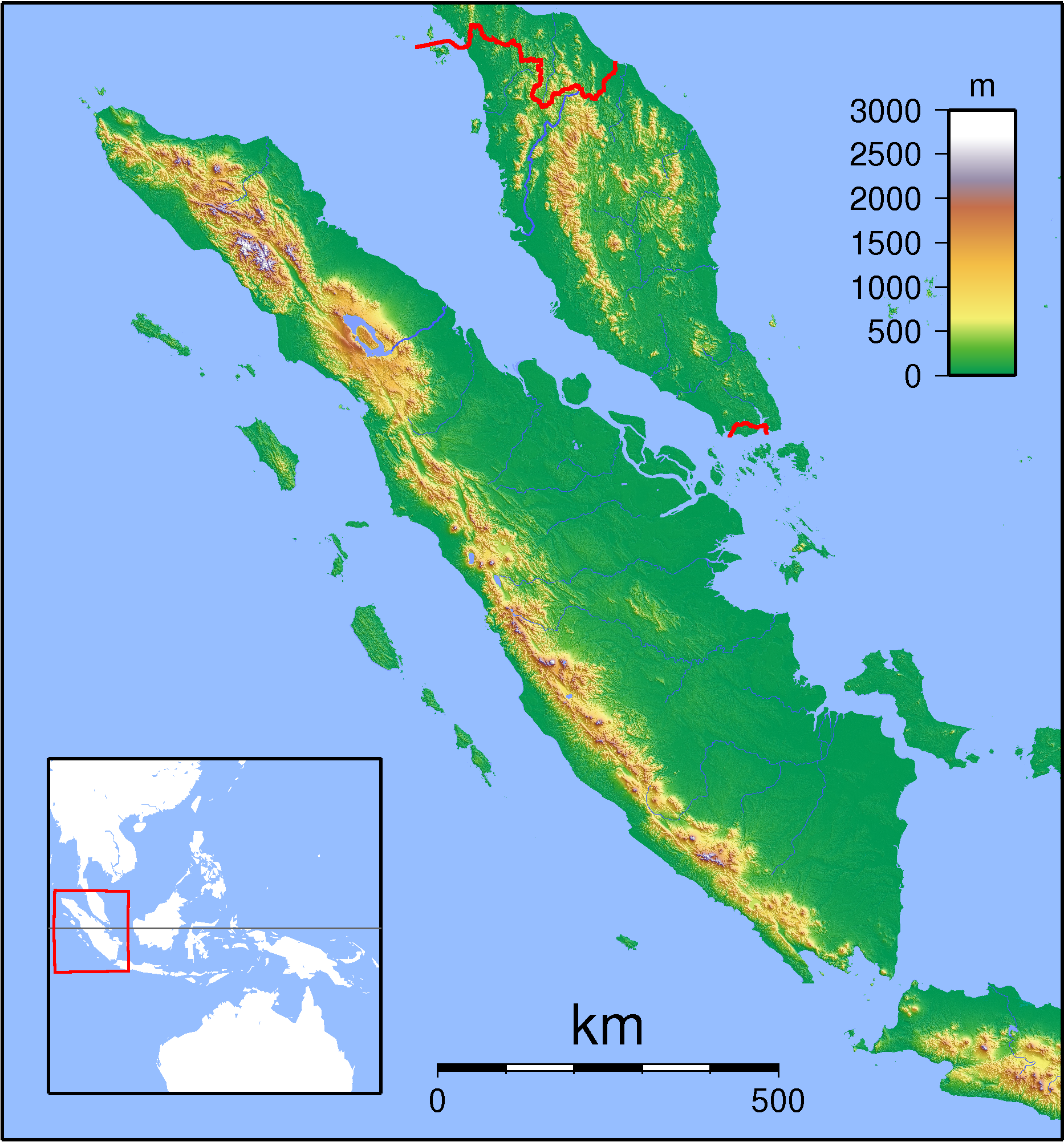
- Cyclommatus elaphus can be found near stratovolcanoes such as Mount Dempo and Bukit Daun, in Sumatra, Indonesia

= Cyclommatus elaphus =

Species of beetle

Cyclommatus elaphus is a species of stag beetle in the family Lucanidae. It is known from Sumatra (Indonesia) and Malaysia. It is also the largest species of the genus Cyclommatus and can grow up to a maximum of 109 mm (4.3 in) from the tip of the mandibles to the end of the abdomen.

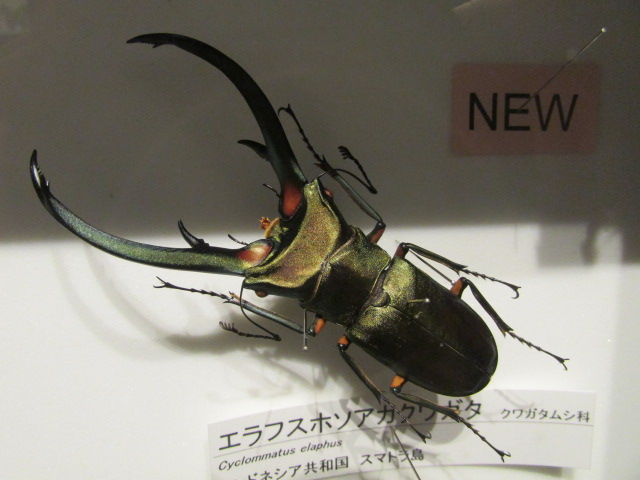
Specimen in Kanagawa Prefectural Museum of Natural History, Japan

Cyclommatus kirchneri and Cyclommatus truncatus from Sumatra were first described as subspecies of Cyclommatus elaphus but are now recognized as full species.
