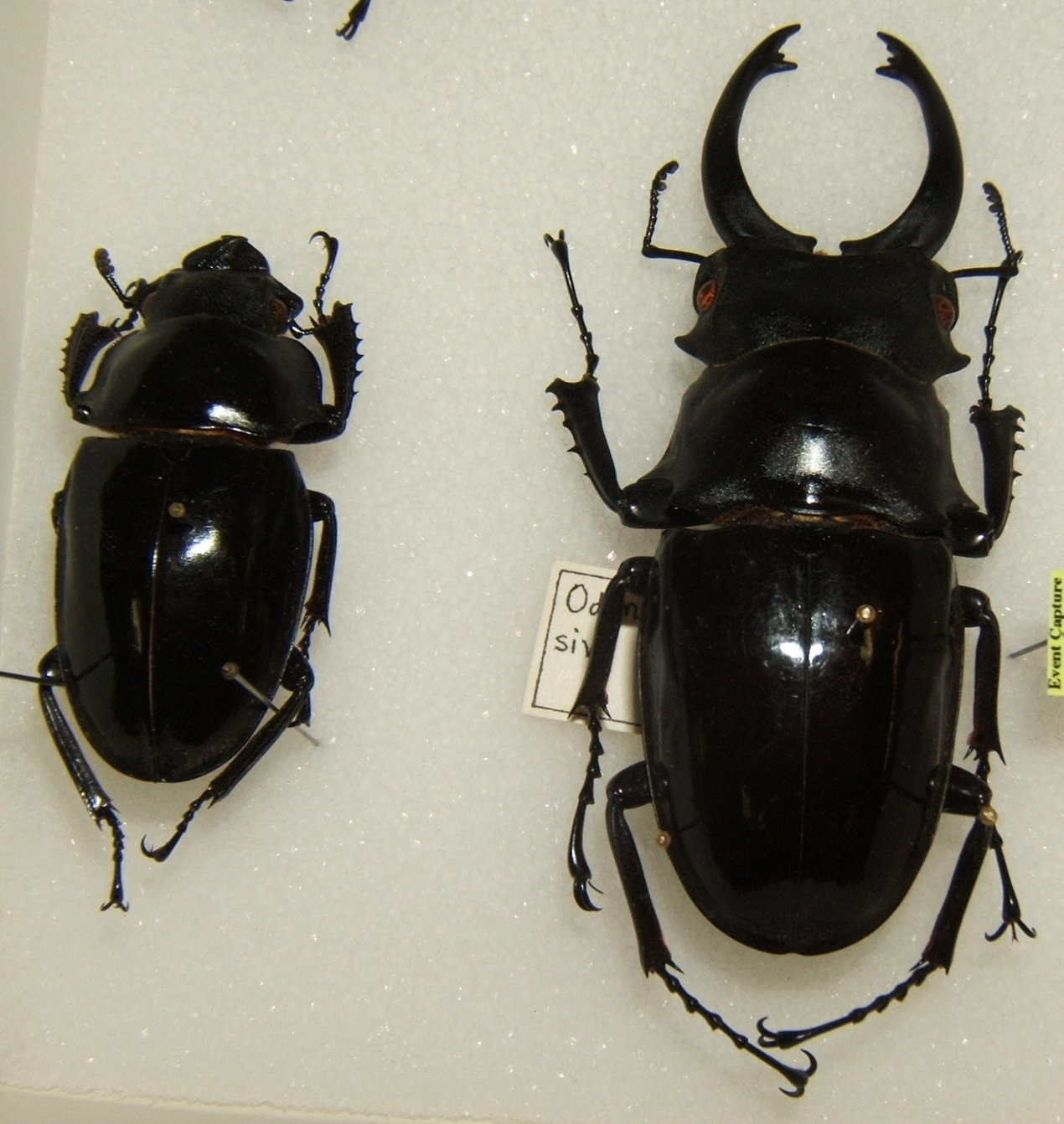
- Odontolabis siva, adult

Scientific classification
- Kingdom: Animalia
- Phylum: Arthropoda
- Class: Insecta
- Order: Coleoptera
- Suborder: Polyphaga
- Infraorder: Scarabaeiformia
- Family: Lucanidae
- Genus: Odontolabis
- Species: O. siva

Binomial name
- Odontolabis siva (Hope & Westwood 1845)

= Odontolabis siva =

Species of beetle

Odontolabis siva is a species of beetle in the family Lucanidae.

== Monograph ==
- Lacroix, J.-P., 1984 - The Beetles of the World, volume 4, Odontolabini I (Lucanidae) - Genera Chalcodes, Odontolabis, Heterochtes.
