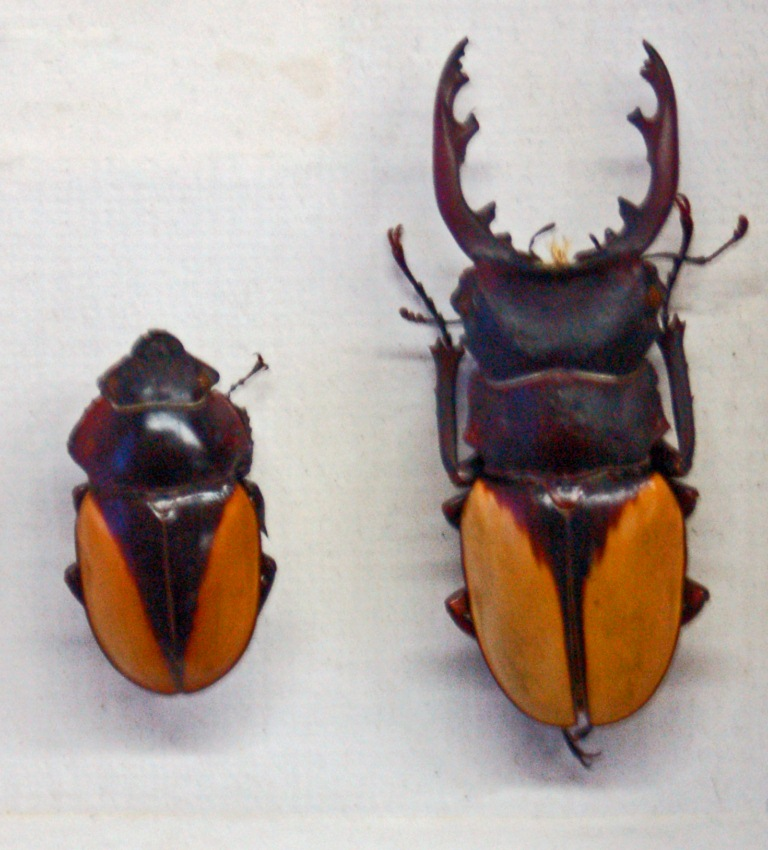
- Odontolabis delesserti, adult female and male from National Museum (Prague)

Scientific classification
- Kingdom: Animalia
- Phylum: Arthropoda
- Clade: Pancrustacea
- Class: Insecta
- Order: Coleoptera
- Suborder: Polyphaga
- Infraorder: Scarabaeiformia
- Family: Lucanidae
- Genus: Odontolabis
- Species: O. delesserti

Binomial name
- Odontolabis delesserti (Guérin-Méneville, 1843)

= Odontolabis delesserti =

Species of beetle

Odontolabis delesserti is a quite rare species of beetles of the family Lucanidae.

== Description ==
Odontolabis delesserti reaches a length of about 33–81 millimetres (1.3–3.2 in). In the males the head is large, with large jaws. The head and the pronotum are dark brown, while elytra are shiny and yellowish, with a triangular dark brown marking.

== Distribution ==
Odontolabis delesserti is found only in southwestern India.
