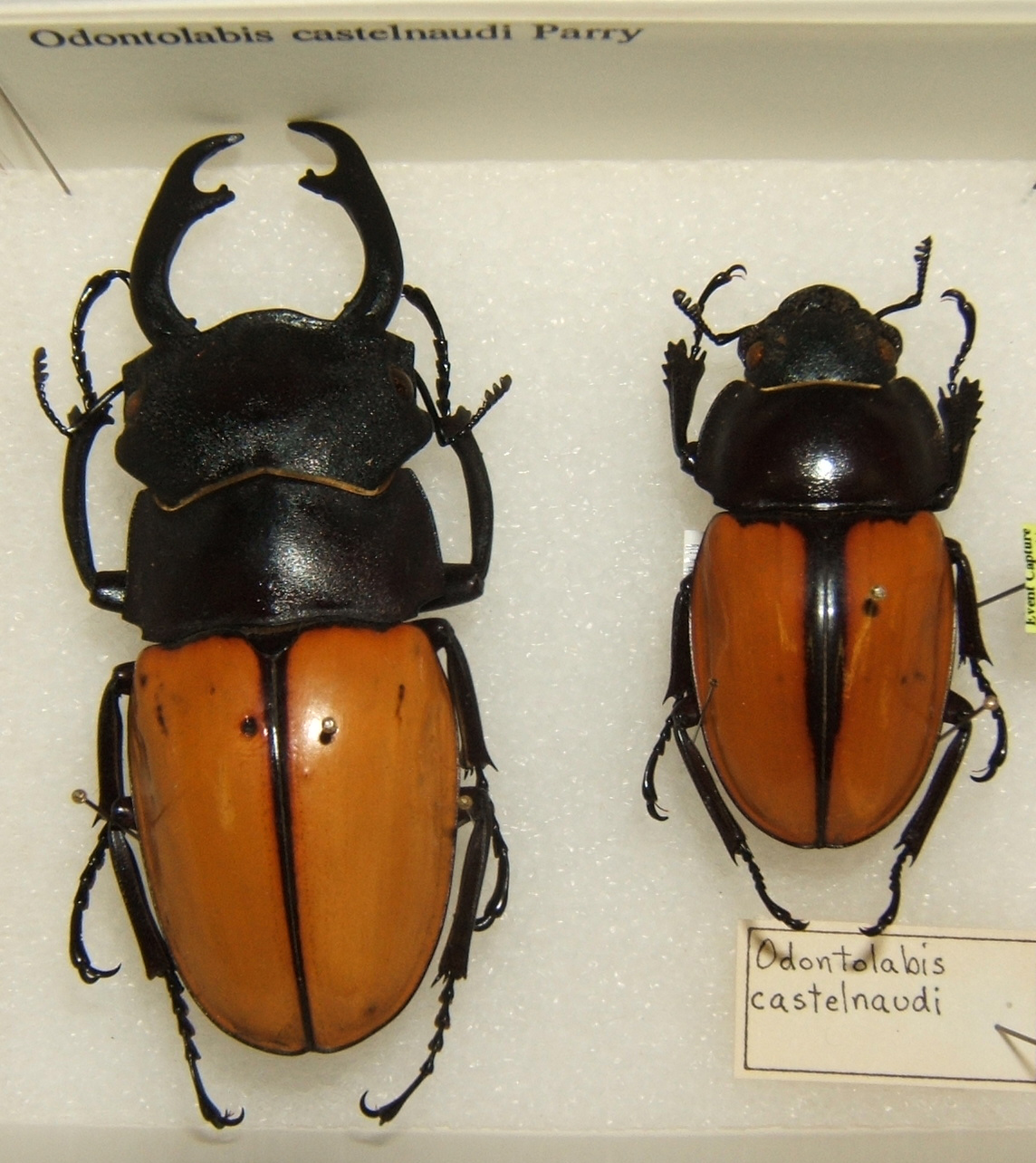
- Odontolabis castelnaudi, adult

Scientific classification
- Kingdom: Animalia
- Phylum: Arthropoda
- Class: Insecta
- Order: Coleoptera
- Suborder: Polyphaga
- Infraorder: Scarabaeiformia
- Family: Lucanidae
- Genus: Odontolabis
- Species: O. castelnaudi

Binomial name
- Odontolabis castelnaudi Parry, 1862

= Odontolabis castelnaudi =

Species of beetle

Odontolabis castelnaudi is a beetle of the family Lucanidae. It is known from Borneo (Sabah, Malaysia) and Sumatra (Indonesia).

Odontolabis castelnaudi can grow to 90 mm (3.5 in) in length. It is mostly black but has yellow wings sheaths.
