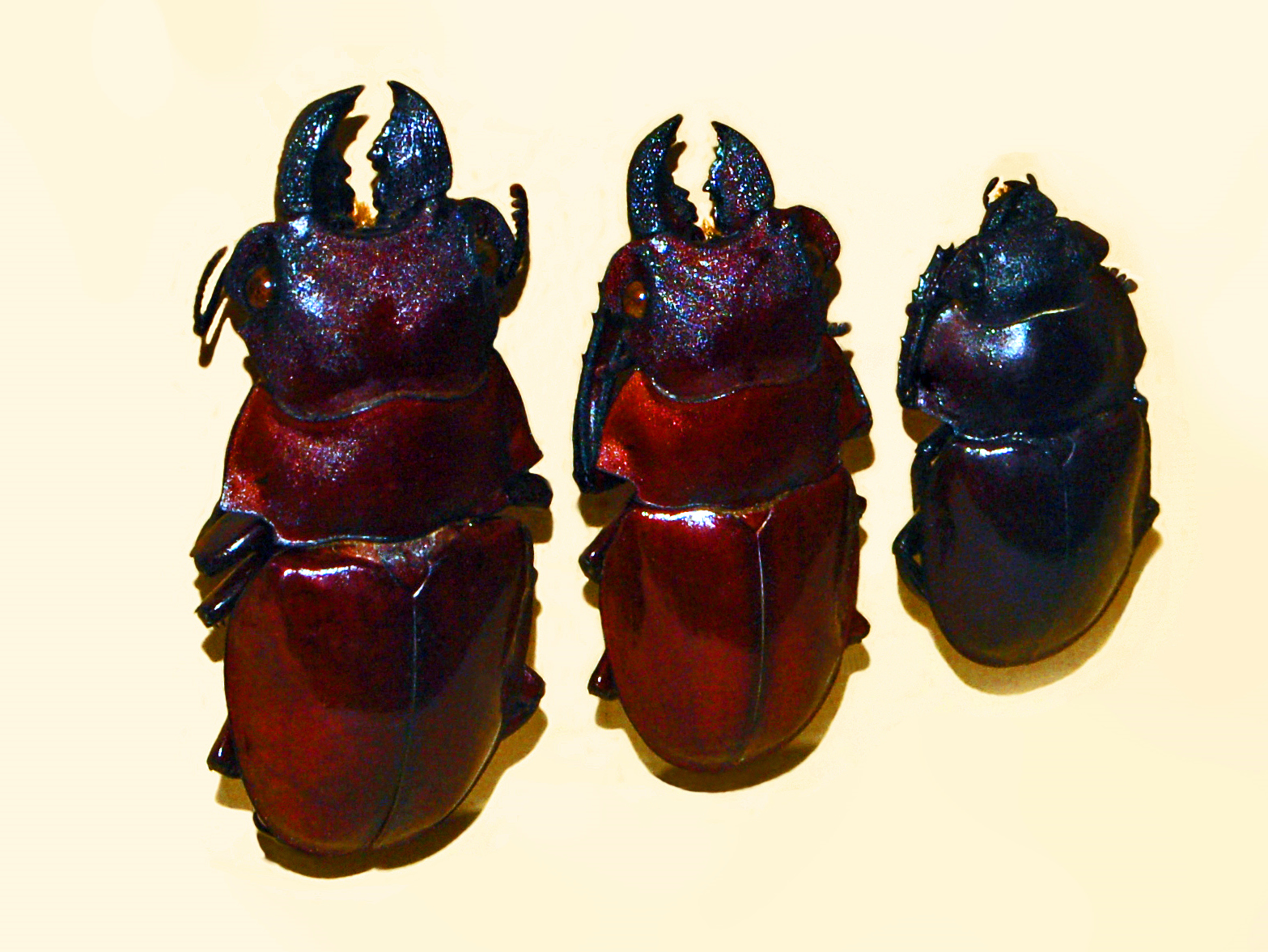
- Odontolabis gazella inaequalis from Nias Island

Scientific classification
- Kingdom: Animalia
- Phylum: Arthropoda
- Clade: Pancrustacea
- Class: Insecta
- Order: Coleoptera
- Suborder: Polyphaga
- Infraorder: Scarabaeiformia
- Family: Lucanidae
- Genus: Odontolabis
- Species: O. gazella

Binomial name
- Odontolabis gazella (Fabricius, 1787)

Synonyms
- Lucanus gazella Fabricius, 1787

= Odontolabis gazella =

Species of beetle

Odontolabis gazella is a species of beetle belonging to the family Lucanidae.

== Description ==
Odontolabis gazella can reach a length of about 40 millimetres (1.6 in) in females and of about 60 millimetres (2.4 in) in males. The basic colour is dark brown. The large mandible of males are used to wrestle each other for mating or food.

== Distribution ==
This species can be found in Malayan Peninsula, Borneo, Sumatra and Balabac Island (Philippines). The subspecies Odontolabis gazella inaequalis Kaup 1868 is endemic of Nias Island (Indonesia).
