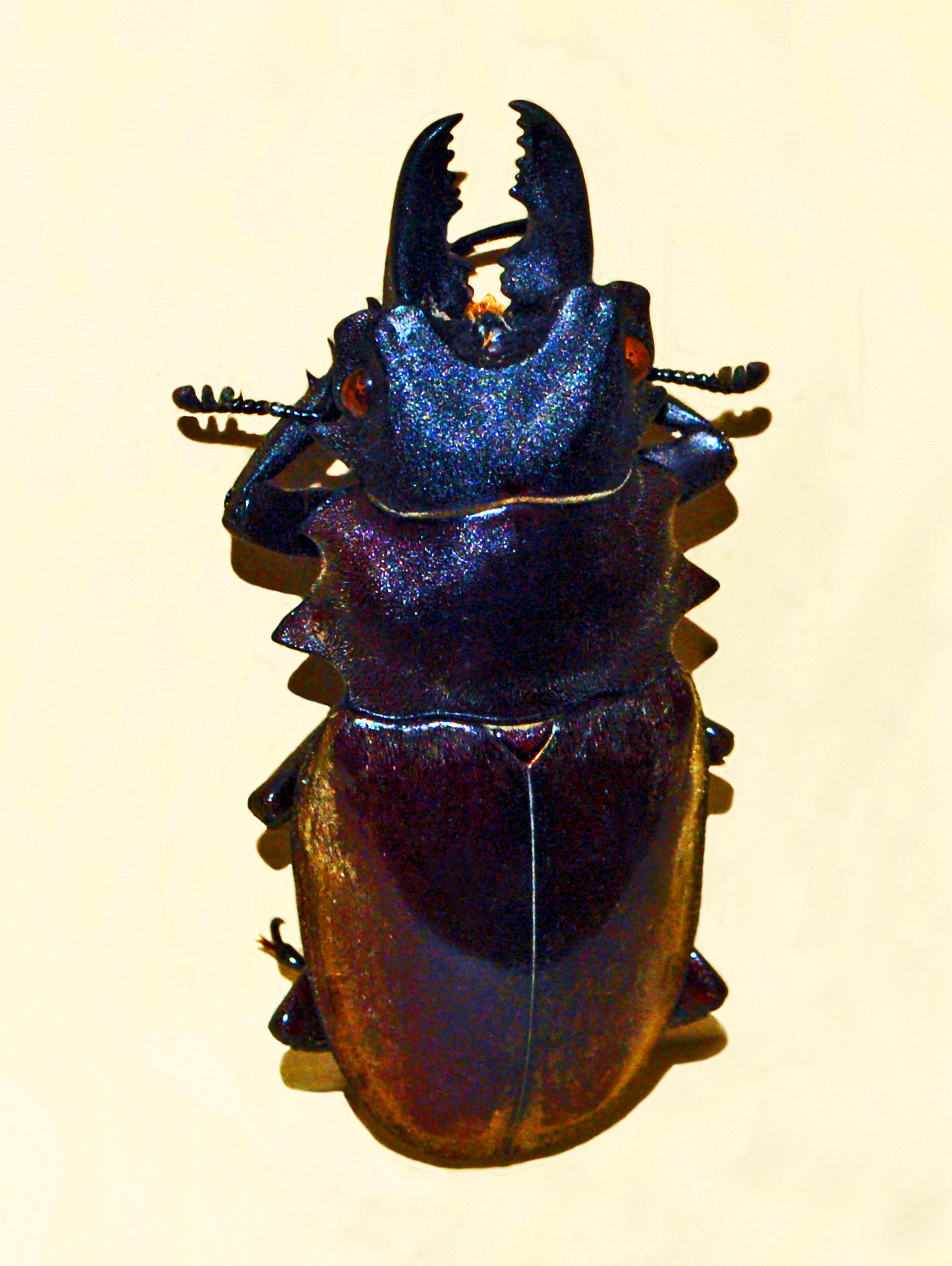
- Odontolabis dalmani from Sumatra

Scientific classification
- Kingdom: Animalia
- Phylum: Arthropoda
- Clade: Pancrustacea
- Class: Insecta
- Order: Coleoptera
- Suborder: Polyphaga
- Infraorder: Scarabaeiformia
- Family: Lucanidae
- Genus: Odontolabis
- Species: O. dalmani

Binomial name
- Odontolabis dalmani (Hope & Westwood, 1845)

Synonyms
- Lucanus dalmanni Hope & Westwood, 1845

= Odontolabis dalmani =

Species of beetle

Odontolabis dalmani is a species of beetles belonging to the family Lucanidae.

== Description ==
Odontolabis dalmani can reach a length of about 40–100 millimetres (1.6–3.9 in). The basic colour is dark brown, with a fine pubescence. The large mandible of males are used to wrestle each other for mating or food. These beetles are nocturnal. Adults feed on tree sap and decaying fruits. The life cycle lasts about 22 – 26 months.

== Distribution ==
This species can be found in Tenasserim Island, Malayan Peninsula, Borneo, Sumatra and Java.

== Etymology ==
The species is named to honour the Swedish entomologist Johan Wilhelm Dalman.
