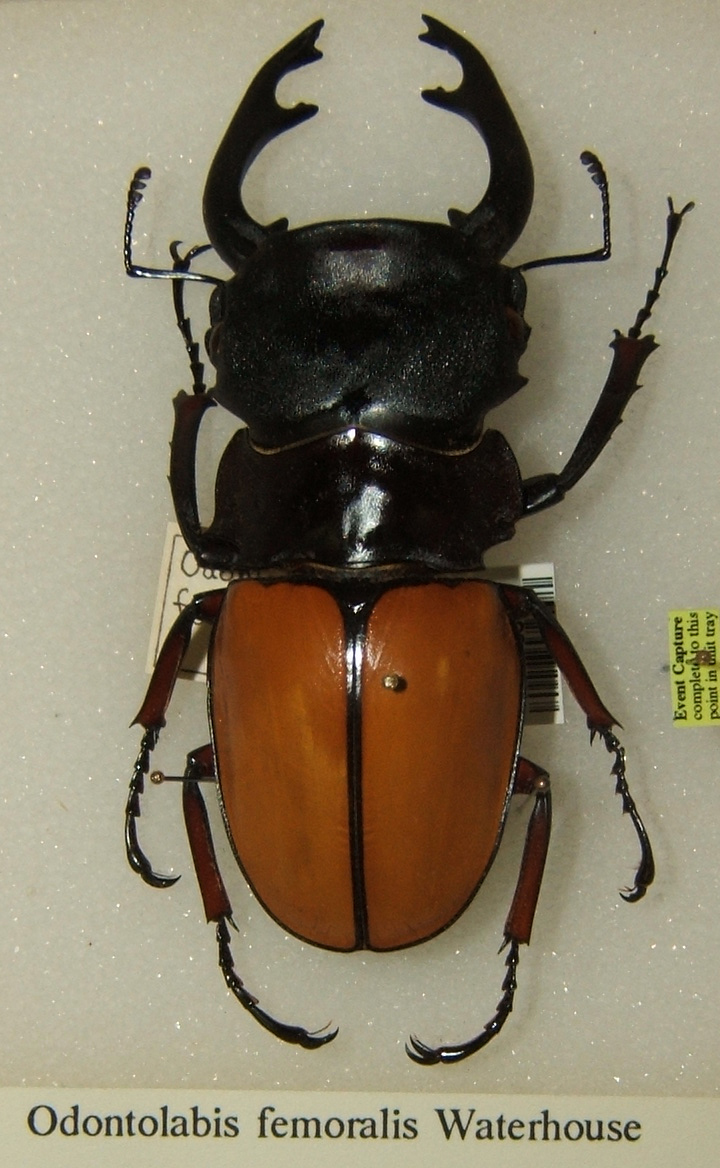
- Odontolabis femoralis, adult

Scientific classification
- Kingdom: Animalia
- Phylum: Arthropoda
- Class: Insecta
- Order: Coleoptera
- Suborder: Polyphaga
- Infraorder: Scarabaeiformia
- Family: Lucanidae
- Genus: Odontolabis
- Species: O. femoralis

Binomial name
- Odontolabis femoralis Waterhouse

= Odontolabis femoralis =

Species of beetle

Odontolabis femoralis is a beetle of the Family Lucanidae. It lives in Indonesia.

== List of subspecies ==
- Odontolabis femoralis femoralis Waterhouse, 1887
- Odontolabis femoralis kinabaluensis Möllenkamp, 1904
- Odontolabis femoralis waterstradti Von Rothenburg, 1900

== Monograph ==
- Lacroix, J.-P., 1984 - The Beetles of the World, volume 4, Odontolabini I (Lucanidae) - Genera Chalcodes, Odontolabis, Heterochtes.
