= Robert Didier =

Robert Didier (4 February 1885 in Porte sur Saône, Haute-Saône – 10 May 1977 in Paris) was a French surgeon, zoologist and entomologist.

Robert Didier was an Associé of the Muséum national d'histoire naturelle in Paris where his friend Eugène Louis Bouvier was Director of the Entomology Laboratory. He worked on mammals, birds and Lucanidae.

He wrote (1953). Catalogue illustré des lucanides du globe in Encyclopédie Entomologique (series A 27: 1-223) with another close friend Eugene Seguy.

His other publications include Les Mammifères de France(1935 with Paul Rode) and L' art de la taxidermie au XXe siècle recueil de technique pratique de taxidermie pour naturalistes, professionnels, amateurs et voyageurs1974, Lechevalier (Paris) with the museum’s senior taxidermist Boudarel.
