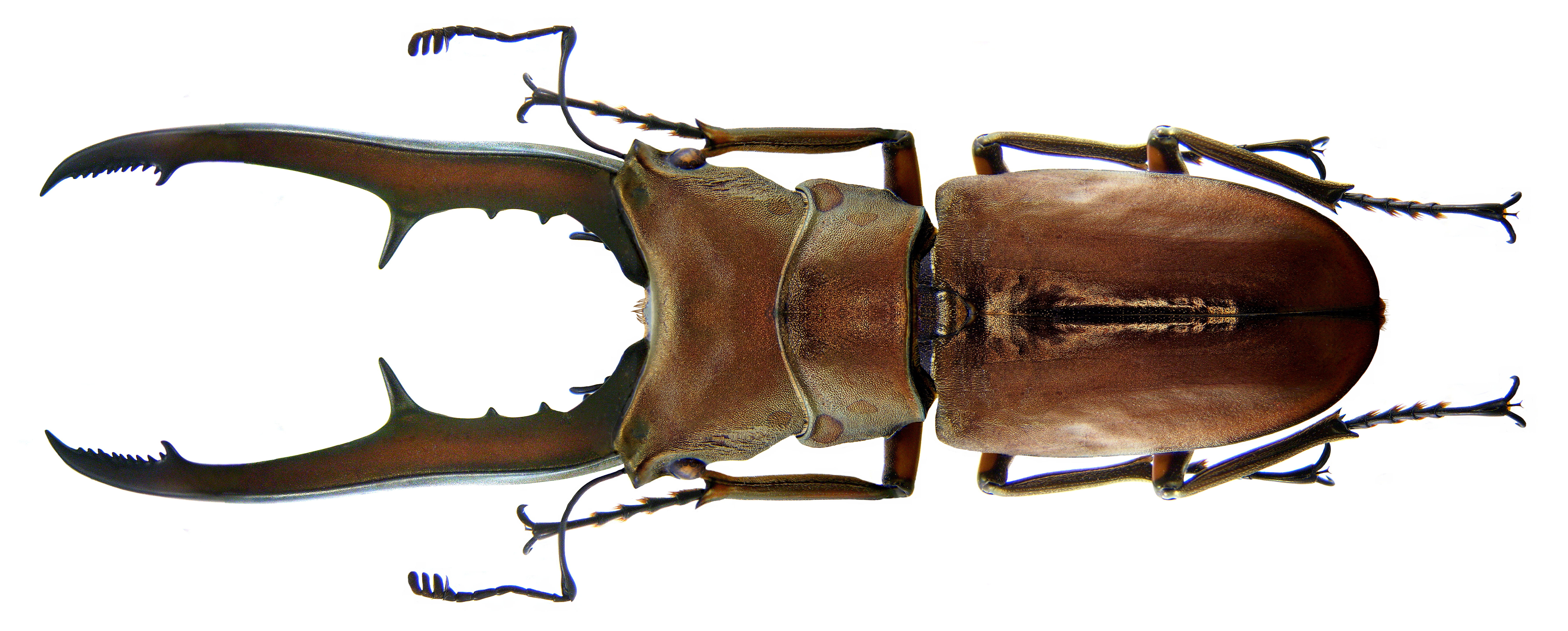

Scientific classification
- Kingdom: Animalia
- Phylum: Arthropoda
- Clade: Pancrustacea
- Class: Insecta
- Order: Coleoptera
- Suborder: Polyphaga
- Infraorder: Scarabaeiformia
- Family: Lucanidae
- Genus: Cyclommatus
- Species: C. metallifer

Binomial name
- Cyclommatus metallifer (Boisduval, 1835)

= Cyclommatus metallifer =

Species of beetle

Cyclommatus metallifer is a species of stag beetle in the family Lucanidae. There is sexual dimorphism within the species. Males are generally larger in size and have enlarged mandibles. It is named for its metallic coloration, which ranges in color and may be varying levels of black, brown, or gold. This species is notably easy to maintain, making it a useful species for scientific study. Additionally, it has been kept as an exotic pet.

== Description ==
C. metallifer exhibits extreme sexual dimorphism, where males are larger than females and have long mandibles. These mandibles are important for sexual selection, and males use them in competition. To compensate for the weakened bite force caused by their long mandibles, males of this species have larger head muscles than females. Because their entire head morphology is specialized for sexual selection, both the head and mandibles can be considered key components of their armaments. Because their bites are so powerful, their mandibles are adapted to resist against bending and torsion. They also have large teeth along their jaws, which are used to improve their grip on rivals.

The size of males varies greatly, with certain subspecies ranging from 26 to 100 millimetres in length. The females are subject to much less variation, typically ranging from 22 to 28 millimetres in length.

To avoid breaking their jaws when biting, male C. metallifer have a high density of mechanoreceptors on their mandibles. These act as sensors to allow C. metallifer to control the force of their bite, which protects their jaws despite having powerful bite muscles. Mechanoreceptors are especially dense around the tips of the mandibles, where the most stress is present.

== Distribution and habitat ==
C. metallifer and all its subspecies are found in Indonesia, primarily on the Maluku Islands and Sulawesi. They prefer a tropical to subtropical environment. They feed on sap, which they obtain by scratching plants with their mandibles. Additionally, they may also gather flowers and fruit.

== Development ==
C. metallifer is characterized by large mandibles in the male. Mandible growth is regulated by juvenile hormone, which controls many aspects of insect growth. Exact mandible size varies and is primarily determined by nutrition in the larval stage. There is a relationship between body size and the length of mandibles, which is a heritable trait. While the actual size of the mandibles is more dependent on nutrients, this relationship between body size and mandibles is determined by genetics.

C. metallifer has been used in genetic studies to determine the genes involved in its sexual dimorphism. Because the sexual dimorphism in this species is so extreme, it is useful for determining the development of these traits. The doublesex gene regulates the differences between males and females. While juvenile hormone is present in both males and females, doublesex influences the expression of this hormone.

== Locomotion ==
The large mandibles in C. metallifer males hinder their ability to move. Their ability to run is reduced, making flight especially important for covering long distances. Males must work harder than females to fly because of the weight of their mandibles. This creates an upper limit on the potential weight of their mandibles. However, variation in both size and shape of mandibles has minimal impact on flight. Mandible size is negatively correlated with wing size, which limits the flying ability of this species. Therefore, their mobility is overall low, which is a significant cost associated with their mandibles.

== Reproduction ==
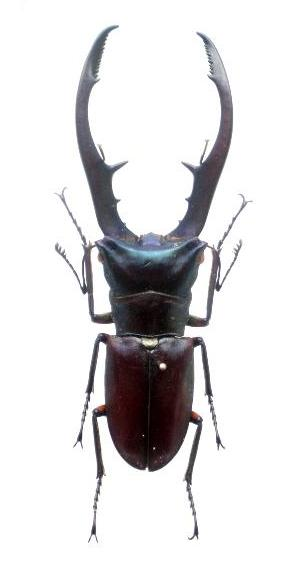
Cyclommatus metallifer aeneomicans

=== Sexual selection ===
The enlarged mandibles of C. metallifer are important for sexual selection. Although individuals with larger mandibles are more desirable mates and better competitors, having large mandibles has several trade-offs in terms of their stability and locomotion. Males compete for mating opportunities using their mandibles. Both mandible size and bite force are important in fights. Size is a visible trait that is positively correlated with fighting ability, making mandible size an example of honest signalling in this species. Because the development of large mandibles involves numerous investments and trade-offs, there is an upper limit to their size.

Competition between males takes the form of several interactions. These include jousting with their mandibles and forcefully biting, concluding with the loser being thrown off the tree and losing access to potential mates. Larger mandibles are advantageous in all of these interactions, and only males that are nearly evenly matched will advance past the early stages of competition.

=== Mating ===
Males will use mate-guarding behaviour to prevent females from mating with other males. This involves chasing away other males and protecting resources such as sap with territorial fights.

== Subspecies ==
These six subspecies belong to the species Cyclommatus metallifer:

- C. m. aeneomicans Parry, 1862 - North Moluccas Archipelago
- C. m. butonensis Kim, Park & Park, 2017 - Buton Island
- C. m. finae Mizunuma & Nagai, 1991 - Banggai Archipelago
- C. m. isogaii Mizunuma & Nagai, 1991- Sula Archipelago
- C. m. metallifer Boisduval, 1835 - Sulawesi Island
- C. m. sangirensis Mizunuma & Nagai, 1991 - Sangir Archipelago
