= Melchior de Lisle =

French entomologist (1908–1977)

Melchior de Lisle (22 February 1908 – 26 August 1977) was a French entomologist. He specialised in Coleoptera Lucanidae.

== His life ==
A biography was written by Jean-Pierre Lacroix.

In 1933 he married Christiane Frommer who operated a music lounge in Paris.

He was an alumnus of the École polytechnique.

In Cameroon he managed works of infrastructure (bridges), and on returning to Paris he became a headmaster of an engineering school.

== Entomological works ==
During his stay in Cameroon, he was interested in cetonids and described new species, subspecies, and observed behavior.

Upon his return to Europe, he was fascinated by the Lucanidae. He gathered a significant collection and described numerous new taxa. His most important works are published in a Swiss zoological journal.

He also studied the Cerambycidae.

== Entomological terms named after him ==
- Bangalaia lislei Villiers, 1941
- Dorcus delislei Nagai & Tsukawaki, 1999
- Figulus delislei Benesh, 1953
- Goniochernes lislei Vachon, 1941
- Horridocalia delislei Endrödi, 1974
- Ixorida venera delislei Miksic, 1972
- Prismognathus delislei Endrödi, 1971
- Rosenbergia lislei Rigout, 1981
- Sclerostomus delislei Weinreich, 1961
- Smaragdesthes delislei Paulian, 1940

== List of the taxa he created ==
The list of the 103 taxa he created, fully referenced, is published on the web.
