= Trimorphism =

Physiological concept

In plant and animal biology, trimorphism is the presence of three distinct forms or morphs, often in relation to reproductive organ development and mating.

In plants, trimorphism can refer to tristyly. In tristylous species, there are three forms, differing in the lengths of their pistils and stamens, in size and color of their pollen grains, and in some other respects. The three floral morphs described by tristyly are flowers with a long style, a medium style, and a short style. In flowers with long styles (L-morph), stamens are short and medium and located below the style. In flowers with medium styles (M-morph), stamens are short and long and located above and below the style. In flowers with short styles (S-morph), stamens are medium and long and located above the style. In most of these systems, due to self-incompatibility mechanisms involving two diallelic loci, fertilization can only occur in combinations between styles and stamens of the same height (i.e. pollen from short stamens can fertilize short styles). Six mating combinations are legitimate and fully fertile, and 12 are illegitimate, or more or less infertile. These systems function to facilitate allogamy, or cross-fertilization.

In animals, Wallace has shown that the females of certain butterflies from the Malay Archipelago appear in three conspicuously distinct forms without intermediate links.

In crystallography, trimorphism refers to the occurrence of certain forms in minerals which have the same chemical composition, but are referable to three systems of crystallization.

== See also ==
- Sexual dimorphism
