= Frederic Parry =

English entomologist (1810–1885)

Frederick John Sidney Parry (28 October 1810 – 1 February 1885, was an English entomologist who specialised in Coleoptera, principally Lucanidae.

Frederick Parry was educated at Harrow School 1823–1826 He attended the Cadetenhausen Dresden from 1827–1828 and was a Lieutenant in the 17th Lancers 1831–1835. He was married to Elizabeth Royds in 1835 and had 6 children. He was a knight of the Belgian Order of Leopold. He wrote "Description of a new genus of Lucanidae from New Zealand" (1843), "A decade or description of ten new species from the Kasya Hills near the boundary of the Assam district" (1845) and 17 further papers. The last was "Description of a new species of Chiasognathus" (1876). "Catalogue of Lucanoid Coleoptera with illustrations and descriptions of various new and interesting species" (1864–1866, revised 1870) listed 357 species.

Parry was a friend of John Obadiah Westwood and lived at 18 Onslow Square, London, close to the Natural History Museum, London, then the British Museum (Natural History).

He was a Fellow of both the Entomological Society of London and the Linnean Society.

Many of Parry's specimens ('at one time he had a general collection of Coleoptera, but latterly it was limited to Lucanidae and Cetoniidae, the former being very valuable, and probably the most complete in existence') were purchased by René Oberthür and other dealers and collectors. They are now conserved in the Natural History Museum (Cerambycidae, Elateridae, Heteromera, Anthribidae, Lucanidae, Cetoniinae and Cleridae). Duplicate specimens from these families and all the Paussidae are in Muséum national d'histoire naturelle in Paris.

Two well-known stag beetles described by Parry are Lucanus swinhoei and Odontolabis castelnaudi.
