= List of Oricon number-one manga of 2013 =

A chart with the best selling manga in Japan is published weekly by Oricon. This list includes the manga that reached the number one place on that chart in 2013.

== Chart history ==
Week	Date	Title	Author	Publisher	Copies	Reference
1	January 7–13	Natsume's Book of Friends, vol.15	Yuki Midorikawa	Hakusensha	135,185	
2	January 14–20	Silver Spoon, vol.6	Hiromu Arakawa	Shogakukan	414,297	
3	January 21–27	Kimi ni Todoke, vol.18	Karuho Shiina	Shueisha	473,368	
4	January 28–February 3	Kimi ni Todoke, vol.18	Karuho Shiina	Shueisha	290,488	
5	February 4–10	Kuroko's Basketball, vol.21	Tadatoshi Fujimaki	Shueisha	430,505	
6	February 11–17	Fairy Tail, vol.36	Hiro Mashima	Kodansha	181,008	
7	February 18–24	Magi: The Labyrinth of Magic, vol.16	Shinobu Ohtaka	Shogakukan	308,469	
8	February 25–March 3	One Piece, vol.69	Eiichiro Oda	Shueisha	404,920	
9	March 4–10	One Piece, vol.69	Eiichiro Oda	Shueisha	1,842,220	
10	March 11–17	One Piece, vol.69	Eiichiro Oda	Shueisha	298,509	
11	March 18–24	Drifters, vol.3	Kouta Hirano	Shōnen Gahosha	271,577	
12	March 25–31	Black Butler, vol.16	Yana Toboso	Square Enix	322,137	
13	April 1–7	Naruto, vol.64	Masashi Kishimoto	Shueisha	648,836	
14	April 8–14	Attack on Titan, vol.10	Hajime Isayama	Kodansha	417,414	
15	April 15–21	Silver Spoon, vol.7	Hiromu Arakawa	Shogakukan	370,676	
16	April 22–28	Vagabond, vol.35	Takehiko Inoue	Kodansha	277,732	
17	April 29–May 5	Kuroko's Basketball, vol.22	Tadatoshi Fujimaki	Shueisha	406,745	
18	May 6–12	Ansatsu Kyōshitsu, vol.4	Yūsei Matsui	Shueisha	132,529	
19	May 13–19	Magi: The Labyrinth of Magic, vol.17	Shinobu Ohtaka	Shogakukan	227,244	
20	May 20–26	Inu x Boku SS, vol.9	Cocoa Fujiwara	Square Enix	223,264	
21	May 27–June 2	Pandora Hearts, vol.20	Jun Mochizuki	Square Enix	87,211	
22	June 3–9	One Piece, vol.70	Eiichiro Oda	Shueisha	2,019,094	
23	June 10–16	One Piece, vol.70	Eiichiro Oda	Shueisha	397,934	
24	June 17–23	Fairy Tail, vol.38	Hiro Mashima	Kodansha	263,367	
25	June 24–30	Kimi ni Todoke, vol.19	Karuho Shiina	Shueisha	597,339	
26	July 1–7	Naruto, vol.65	Masashi Kishimoto	Shueisha	621,846	
27	July 8–14	Silver Spoon, vol.6	Hiromu Arakawa	Shogakukan	386,153	
28	July 15–21	Detective Conan, vol.80	Gosho Aoyama	Shogakukan	291,054	
29	July 22–28	Giant Killing, vol.28	Masaya Tsunamoto, Tsujitomo	Kodansha	189,629	
30	July 29–August 4	One Piece, vol.71	Eiichiro Oda	Shueisha	1,542,134	
31	August 5–11	Attack on Titan, vol.11	Hajime Isayama	Kodansha	764,022	
32	August 12–18	Attack on Titan, vol.11	Hajime Isayama	Kodansha	290,893	
33	August 19–25	Terra Formars, vol.6	Yū Sasuga, Kenichi Tachibana	Shueisha	317,248	
34	August 26–September 1	Black Butler, vol.17	Yana Toboso	Square Enix	349,405	
35	September 2–8	Naruto, vol.66	Masashi Kishimoto	Shueisha	679,096	
36	September 9–15	Naruto, vol.66	Masashi Kishimoto	Shueisha	172,373	
37	September 16–22	Magi: The Labyrinth of Magic, vol.18	Shinobu Ohtaka	Shogakukan	311,414	
38	September 23–29	March Comes in Like a Lion, vol.9	Chica Umino	Hakusensha	299,145	
39	September 30–October 6	Kuroko's Basketball, vol.24	Tadatoshi Fujimaki	Shueisha	364,400	
40	October 7–13	Kuroko's Basketball, vol.24	Tadatoshi Fujimaki	Shueisha	159,795	
41	October 14–20	Silver Spoon, vol.9	Hiromu Arakawa	Shogakukan	389,515	
42	October 21–27	Kimi ni Todoke, vol.20	Karuho Shiina	Shueisha	387,520	
43	October 28–November 3	One Piece, vol.72	Eiichiro Oda	Shueisha	1,540,005	
44	November 4–10	One Piece, vol.72	Eiichiro Oda	Shueisha	638,853	
45	November 11–17	Sakamoto desu ga?, vol.2	Nami Sano	Kadokawa	202,265	
46	November 18–24	Terra Formars, vol.7	Yū Sasuga, Kenichi Tachibana	Shueisha	312,009	
47	November 25–December 1	Real, vol.13	Takehiko Inoue	Shueisha	156,852	
48	December 2–8	Naruto, vol.67	Masashi Kishimoto	Shueisha	653,624	
49	December 9–15	Attack on Titan, vol.12	Hajime Isayama	Kodansha	924,685	
50	December 16–22	Fairy Tail, vol.41	Hiro Mashima	Kodansha	283,437	
51	December 23–29	Blue Exorcist, vol.12	Kazue Katō	Shueisha	276,710	
52	December 30–January 5	Blue Exorcist, vol.12	Kazue Katō	Shueisha	214,948	
