= Terra Formars =

Japanese manga series

- First tankōbon volume cover, featuring a young Shoukichi Komachi

テラフォーマーズ (Tera Fōmāzu)
- Genre: Adventure; Horror; Science fiction
- Manga
- Written by: Yū Sasuga
- Illustrated by: Kenichi Tachibana
- Published by: Shueisha
- English publisher: NA: Viz Media
- Imprint: Young Jump Comics
- Magazine: Miracle Jump (2011); Weekly Young Jump (2012–present)
- Original run: January 13, 2011 – present
- Volumes: 24
Further information
Manga
Terrafo Police
Written by	Manpuku Dou
Illustrated by	Kaito Shibano
Published by	Shueisha
Imprint	Young Jump Comics
Magazine	Jump X
Original run	May 10, 2014 – October 10, 2014
Volumes	1
Manga
Terra Formars wa Oyasumi Desu
Written by	Shouta Hattori
Published by	Shueisha
Imprint	Young Jump Comics
Magazine	Tonari no Young Jump
Original run	May 10, 2014 – November 18, 2016
Volumes	6
Manga
Oshiete! Michelle Kyōkan
Written by	Ryousangata Serebi
Published by	Shueisha
Imprint	Young Jump Comics
Magazine	Tonari no Young Jump
Original run	May 10, 2014 – November 19, 2014
Volumes	1
Original video animation
Terra Formars: Bugs 2 Arc
Directed by	Hiroshi Hamasaki
Produced by	Hiroyuki Ōmori; Satoshi Tanaka; Shinya Shinozaki; Tsutomu Yanagimura; Masato Sakai
Written by	Shōgo Yasukawa
Music by	Shūsei Murai
Studio	Liden Films
Released	August 20, 2014 – November 28, 2014
Runtime	24–29 minutes
Episodes	2
Anime television series
Directed by	Hiroshi Hamasaki
Produced by	Hiroyuki Ōmori; Satoshi Tanaka; Shinya Shinozaki; Tsutomu Yanagimura; Masato Sakai
Written by	Shōgo Yasukawa
Music by	Shūsei Murai
Studio	Liden Films
Licensed by	AUS: Madman Entertainment; NA: Viz Media; UK: Kazé UK
Original network	Tokyo MX, ABC, CBC, TV Asahi Channel 1, BS11
English network	SEA: Animax Asia
Original run	September 26, 2014 – December 19, 2014
Episodes	13
Manga
Terra Formars Gaiden Rain Hard
Written by	Satoshi Kimura
Published by	Shueisha
Imprint	Young Jump Comics
Magazine	Ultra Jump
Original run	October 18, 2014 – February 19, 2015
Volumes	1
Manga
Terra Formars Gaiden Asimov
Written by	Boichi
Published by	Shueisha
Imprint	Young Jump Comics
Magazine	Grand Jump
Original run	November 4, 2015 – June 15, 2016
Volumes	2
Manga
Terra Formars Gaiden Keiji Onizuka
Written by	Nonoyama Saki
Published by	Shueisha
Imprint	Young Jump Comics
Magazine	Miracle Jump
Original run	December 15, 2015 – April 19, 2016
Volumes	1
Manga
Terraho-kun
Written by	Forbidden Shibukawa
Published by	Shueisha
Imprint	Young Jump Comics
Magazine	Weekly Young Jump
Original run	January 7, 2016 – April 14, 2016
Volumes	1
Anime television series
Terra Formars: Revenge
Directed by	Michio Fukuda
Produced by	Hiroyuki Ōmori; Satoshi Tanaka; Shinya Shinozaki; Tsutomu Yanagimura; Masato Sakai; Hideaki Iwamoto; Shigeaki Miyata
Written by	Naruhisa Arakawa
Music by	Michio Fukuda
Studio	Liden Films; TYO Animations
Licensed by	AUS: Madman Entertainment; NA: Viz Media
Original network	Tokyo MX, TVA, ABC, BS11, TV Asahi Channel 1
English network	SEA: Animax Asia
Original run	April 1, 2016 – June 24, 2016
Episodes	13
Original video animation
Terra Formars: Earth Arc
Directed by	Michio Fukuda
Produced by	Hiroyuki Ōmori; Satoshi Tanaka; Shinya Shinozaki; Tsutomu Yanagimura; Hideaki Iwamoto; Shigeaki Miyata; Shinya Saitō (#1); Michiko Koyanagi (#2)
Written by	Michio Fukuda
Music by	Takafumi Wada
Studio	Liden Films; Yumeta Company
Released	August 17, 2018 – November 19, 2018
Runtime	25–28 minutes
Episodes	2
Live-action film
Terra Formars (2016)
- icon

Terra Formars (Japanese: テラフォーマーズ, Hepburn: Tera Fōmāzu) is a Japanese manga series written by Yū Sasuga and illustrated by Kenichi Tachibana. It was originally serialized in Shueisha's seinen manga magazine Miracle Jump from January to December 2011, and was transferred to Weekly Young Jump in April 2012. Its chapters have been collected in 24 tankōbon volumes as of August 2026. The story follows humanity's struggle against mutated humanoid cockroaches on Mars, leading to deadly expeditions and battles to save Earth from a mysterious virus and the invading creatures. In North America, the manga is licensed for English release by Viz Media.

A two-episode original video animation (OVA) adaptation, Terra Formars: Bugs 2 Arc, was released in 2014, and an anime television series adaptation, covering the Annex 1 story arc, was broadcast as well in that same year. A second season, Terra Formars: Revenge, was broadcast in 2016. A live action film adaptation directed by Takashi Miike was released in 2016.

== Plot ==
In an attempt to colonize Mars, 21st-century scientists are tasked with terraforming the planet. Their goal is to seed Mars with modified algae that can absorb sunlight and purify the atmosphere, along with cockroaches, whose corpses will help spread the algae across the planet as they feed.

Five hundred years later, the first crewed ship to Mars lands, and its six crew members are attacked by giant mutated humanoid cockroaches with incredible physical strength, later labeled "Terraformars." The crew is wiped out after sending a warning back to Earth. Two years later, BUGS II, a multinational expedition of genetically modified humans, is sent to collect ten samples of both sexes of roaches and exterminate the mutated bugs to take control of the red planet. Only two survivors manage to return to Earth, one of whom vows to return and avenge their fallen companions. As a third expedition is assembled, questions arise about the true origin of the Terraformars and their connection to an unknown disease afflicting mankind, known as the Alien Engine Virus, or A.E. Virus. To combat the Terraformars' strength and agility, members of the second and third expeditions undergo genetic modification to inherit the characteristics of other organisms, a process made possible only after having a special organ implanted, which carries a 36% chance of survival during the surgery.

The third expedition also ends with most of its crew members killed, either in battles against the Terraformars or in conflicts among themselves within the multi-sided struggle between the various factions aboard the ship, each with its own opposing interests. Despite this, the few survivors manage to collect enough samples for research on a cure for the A.E. Virus and return home. However, a new fight against the Terraformars begins when it is revealed that the creatures arrived on Earth long before. After multiplying at an alarming rate and adapting to their new environment far better than they did on their homeworld, they initiate their plan to take over the planet.

== Characters ==
=== BUGS 2 ===
Shokichi Komachi (小町 小吉, Komachi Shōkichi)
Voiced by: Hidenobu Kiuchi (Japanese); Christopher Corey Smith (English)
A member of the second expedition to Mars, Komachi is one of its few survivors. His strong sense of justice compels him to protect others, a drive that once led him to kill an abuser in his youth. He later undergoes the M.O. operation to follow his childhood friend, Nanao, to Mars. After witnessing her death, he returns two decades later as the leader of the Annex I's Japanese squad. His Asian giant hornet-based abilities grant him immense strength and a lethal sting. He is mortally wounded by Joseph G. Newton but achieves victory by using an overdose of transformation serum to sustain his body for a final attack.
Ichiro Hiruma (蛭間 一郎, Hiruma Ichirō)
Voiced by: Tomokazu Sugita
As the other survivor of the BUGS 2 expedition, Hiruma is a pragmatic individual who initially attempted to betray his crew for financial gain. His experiences on Mars lead him to a political career, where he eventually becomes the Prime Minister of Japan, working to secure his nation's interests in the Annex I mission. His M.O. procedure grants him abilities based on the sleeping chironomid, providing an incredibly durable carapace and enhanced strength.
Nanao Akita (秋田 奈々緒, Akita Nanao)
Voiced by: Ayako Kawasumi (Japanese); Cherami Leigh (English)
Shokichi's childhood friend and love interest who, after her stepfather was killed by Shokichi, joined the BUGS 2 crew. All she wanted was a peaceful life with Shokichi after returning to Earth, but tragically she was the first victim of the Terraformars when one of the roaches snapped her neck, dying in Shokichi's arms. Her powers were based on the silk moth, but died before being able to show them, until one of the Terraformars managed to copy her powers twenty years later.
Donatello K. Davis (ドナテロ・K・デイヴス, Donatero K Deivusu)
Voiced by: Rikiya Koyama
The Captain of the BUGS 2 mission and Michelle's father. His powers were based on the Paraponera clavata, an ant so ferocious that even Army Ants will steer clear of its path, and is believed to be the world's strongest insect. He was capable of splitting in two the previously untouchable roaches with the pure strength of his arms or crush their heads with one hand. His power allowed him to fight off a horde of roaches singlehanded, giving time for his crew to escape. He was murdered by Victoria Wood. His daughter Michelle inherited his ant powers. Twenty years later, Michelle faces a roach that stole his powers.
Thien (ティン, Tin)
Voiced by: Tomohisa Hashizume
Coming from Thailand, his powers were based on the desert locust and acquired an extreme leg strength that could decapitate a Terraformar with one kick. He sacrifices himself to allow Shokichi and Ichiro to use the BUGS 2 emergency escape pod to save themselves, after he overdosed on the drug and his body was more locust than human. He dies while being hugged by Komachi, calling him a friend. Twenty years later a cockroach is able to copy his powers.
Zhang Ming-Ming (張 明明（チョウ ミンミン), Chō Minmin)
Voiced by: Ayahi Takagaki
The lieutenant of the BUGS 2 crew, her powers were based on a mantis, that gave her 2 mantis-like arms capable of cutting the roaches. She was killed by one of the evolved cockroaches. She was Liu Yiwu's childhood friend and was sent to as a spy to steal the technology on the BUGS surgery in America, only to be captured and underwent the BUGs surgery as part of her release negotiations by the Chinese government.
God Lee (ゴッド・リー, Goddo Rī)
Voiced by: Kenjiro Tsuda
Coming from Israel, his powers were based on the bombardier beetle, and he was able to mix hydrogen peroxide and hydroquinone just like the bug itself. Combining these two substances, he could then release a spray of extremely hot benzoquinone from his palms, creating a huge explosion, not unlike a flame-thrower. He was the first person to die battling the cockroaches. Twenty years later a roach was able to copy his powers and uses them to kill Sheila.
Maria Viren (マリア・ビレン, Maria Biren)
Voiced by: Nana Mizuki (Japanese); Erica Mendez (English)
Coming from Russia, her powers were based on the rainbow stag beetle. She was cut in half by one of the roaches swift kick, despite the natural strength of the beetle's shell. Her powers are then used by one of the cockroaches, twenty years later.
Victoria Wood (ヴィクトリア・ウッド, Vikutoria Uddo)
Voiced by: Ami Koshimizu
Coming from South Africa, her powers were based on the emerald cockroach wasp, and she was capable of enslaving cockroaches by stinging them in the brain and even hiding within their bodies. She tried to betray the rest of the crew alongside Ichiro by bringing a roach egg, but later she revealed her plan on taking over the world using her powers. Unexpectedly the egg hatched and the newly evolved roaches were immune to her poison. She died during the crash landing.

=== Annex I ===
Akari Hizamaru (膝丸 燈, Hizamaru Akari)
Voiced by: Yoshimasa Hosoya (Japanese); Chris Niosi (English)
A Japanese member of the Annex I expedition, Akari is the son of a BUGS 2 crewmember, granting him latent inherited abilities. His M.O. procedure bestows the powers of the Japanese bagworm moth, enabling him to generate strong, elastic threads invisible to Terraformars. He wields these in tandem with a katana and martial arts. His innate mantis-based abilities later manifest, producing a sharp limb and transforming his threads into thorned, razor-sharp weapons. A mutual attraction exists between him and his superior, Michelle K. Davis.
Michelle K. Davis (ミッシェル・K・デイヴス, Missheru Kei Deivusu)
Voiced by: Shizuka Itō (Japanese); Erica Lindbeck (English)
Michelle K. Davis is the American leader of the Annex I expedition and the granddaughter of an executive behind the first mission. As the child of a BUGS 2 crewmember, she inherits the Paraponera abilities, granting her formidable strength and durability. Her own M.O. procedure adds the power of the blast ant, enabling explosive attacks. Six jet propellants enhance her speed and striking force. A mutual attraction exists between her and her subordinate, Akari.
Marcos Eringrad Garcia (マルコス・エリングラッド・ガルシア, Marukosu Eringuraddo Garushia)
Voiced by: Kaito Ishikawa (Japanese); Robbie Daymond (English)
A Mexican boy who joins the Annex I crew alongside his childhood friends Alex and Sheila in order to escape the poverty of his country and gain an American citizenship. His M.O. Operation powers come from the huntsman spider giving him great strength, ferocity and incredible speed that can bypass the roaches, leaving them no time to counterattack. Despite his immeasurable speed, his endurance is a bit low, forcing him to recharge after some time fighting, leaving him vulnerable to attack. In combat Marcos also uses a staff that he calls the "Arachnebuster Mk.II" that he uses to deflect ranged attacks and impale the roaches.
Alex Kandley Stewart (アレックス・カンドリ・スチュワート, Arekkusu Kandori Suchuwāto)
Voiced by: KENN (Japanese); Steve Staley (English)
A Mexican member of the Annex I crew, Alex joins the mission to earn American citizenship and pursue a professional baseball career. His M.O. procedure grants him the abilities of the harpy eagle, enhancing his eyesight eightfold and granting immense upper-body strength for flight. His powerful grip allows him to throw objects with bullet-like force and pinpoint accuracy from great distances.
Sheila Levitt (シーラ・レヴィッ, Shīra Revitsu)
Voiced by: Ai Kayano (Japanese); Erica Lindbeck (English)
A Mexican girl that along with her two childhood friends Marcos and Alex escaped from her country and joined the Annex I to have the American citizenship. She seems to have a crush on Shokichi. She is killed when, while trying to capture a roach, the insect unexpectedly uses the powers of one of the fallen BUGS 2 crew to shoot a hole through her chest. She dies while trying to confess her feelings for Shokichi, to which he apparently understood her.
Keiji Onizuka (鬼塚 慶次, Onizuka Keiji)
Voiced by: Daisuke Ono (Japanese); Max Mittelman (English)
A member of the Annex I crew that joined the mission in order to pay the debts of the treatment of his retinal detachment. A former lightweight boxing champion, his M.O. Operation powers come from the peacock mantis shrimp, making him incredibly strong and durable, capable of regenerate any lost limbs after a few minutes with little effort. In addition to their powerful blows, the mantis shrimp also possesses one of the most advanced eyes in the animal kingdom, enabling him to see clearly in pitch-darkness.
Kanako Sanjō (三条 加奈子, Sanjou Kanako)
Voiced by: Chiaki Takahashi (Japanese); Cherami Leigh (English)
A member of the Annex I crew who joined the mission in order to pay and sever her connections with her disgraced family. Her M.O. Operation powers come from the white-throated needletail, which grants her lightweight skin of amylose and strong chest muscles enough to lift her body into the air. While flying, she is so fast that the terraformar cannot match her movements. She uses a special body kit weapon with blades that allows her to swiftly kill several terraformars.
Yaeko Yanasegawa (柳瀬川 八恵子, Yanasegawa Yaeko)
Voiced by: Aki Toyosaki (Japanese); Erin Fitzgerald (English)
A Japanese girl that joined the Annex Project because of her financial debts. Her M.O. Operation powers come from the striped skunk and is capable of producing a smell so strong even the Terraformars will stay away from her (for some time), but she lacks any offensive capabilities. When used in tandem with Akari, however, the chemicals that produce the smell can cause lethal damage to her opponents.
Jared Anderson (ジャレッド・アンダーソン, Jareddo Andāson)
Voiced by: Katsui Taira (Japanese); Max Mittelman (English)
An American man that joined the Annex Project to pay his economical debts. His M.O. Operation powers come from the killer whale, which makes him able to use echolocation by sending out ultrasonic waves and through the reflection of these waves, he is able to accurately locate and identify enemies even if they are underground or not visible. He was shot in the throat by the Archer Fish Terraformar and then he sacrificed himself to protect the unconscious members of his team from the Echidna Terraformars.
Sylvester Asimov (シルヴェスター・アシモフ, Shiruvesutā Ashimofu)
Voiced by: Unshou Ishizuka (Japanese); Patrick Seitz (English)
The leader of the Russian squad, Sylvester Asimov joins the Annex Project to find a cure for the A.E. virus and save his daughter. A highly perceptive individual, he can deduce others' M.O. abilities through analysis and develops theories on the Terraformars' origin. His procedure grants him the powers of the Tasmanian giant crab, bestowing immense strength, durability, and the ability to regenerate lost limbs within minutes. A skilled practitioner of judo and samba, he remains on Mars with Liu and Shōkichi to ensure the escape of the other survivors.
Ivan Perepelkin (イワン・ペレペルキナ, Iwan Pereperukina)
Voiced by: Kenji Akabane (Japanese); Christopher Corey Smith (English)
A member of the Russian squad, Ivan is characteristically cheerful and positive. After the death of his sister Elena, he strives to adopt a more serious demeanor. His unique M.O. procedure grants him powers derived from the plant Datura stramonium, enabling him to induce fever, hallucinations, respiratory failure, and cardiac arrest in opponents through physical contact, though his imprecise dosage often proves fatal. He also employs grenades that aerosolize his poison into a debilitating gas.
Elena Perepelkina (エレナ・ペレペルキナ, Erena Pereperukina)
Voiced by: Romi Park (Japanese); Erin Fitzgerald (English)
A member of the Russian team that joins the Annex project alongside her brother Ivan. Unlike her brother, she is always calm, serious and self-confident. While trying to capture a roach using a special net, the bug unexpectedly uses the super speed powers of one of the fallen members of the BUGS 2 crew to decapitate her.
Alexander Asimov (アレクサンドル・アシモフ, Arekusandoru Ashimofu)
Voiced by: Toru Nara (Japanese); Bryce Papenbrook (English)
A member of the Russian squad, Ivan Perepelnya joined the Annex Project to find a cure for the A.E. virus and save his family. His laid-back demeanor belies a fierce loyalty. His M.O. procedure grants him abilities from the Sumatra stag beetle, enabling him to generate smoke by burning his innards and to cut through Terraformars. In a final assault against the Chinese squad to eliminate Hong, he hesitates upon her plea and is overwhelmed, ultimately overdosing on the transformation drug and succumbing to his wounds.
Nina Yujik (ニーナ・ユージック, Nīna Yūjikku)
Voiced by: Yuko Kaida (Japanese); Stephanie Sheh (English)
A member of the Russian squad, Nina joins the Annex Project with her husband, Aaron, though a mutual attraction exists with her comrade Ivan Perepelnya. Her M.O. procedure grants her the abilities of the Deathstalker scorpion, allowing her to grow two venomous tails. She effectively combines this power with her skill in Sambo. Nina is ultimately killed in combat by an Evolved Terraformar.
Aaron Yujik (アーロン・ユージック, Āron Yūjikku)
Voiced by: Masami Iwasaki
A member of the Russian team who joined the Annex Project alongside his wife Nina. His M.O. Operation powers originate from the Chinese red-headed centipede, that makes his skin (with the exception of his joints) both resilient and hard. He dies while protecting his wife from the Demon Dragonfly Terraformar, and his corpse is taken by the Terraformars.
Sergei Seleznyov (セルゲイ・セレズニョフ, Serugei Serezunyofu)
Voiced by: Kengo Tsuji
A member of the Russian squad, Sergei's M.O. procedure grants him the abilities of the Japanese mountain mole, enabling him to dig tunnels at great speed with his powerful claws and arms. He is killed by Terraformars during the final battle to reach the evacuation ship.
Anastasia Andreevna Politkovskaya (アナスタシア・アンドレーヴナ・ポリトコフスカヤ, Anasutashia Andorēvuna Poritokofusukaya)
Voiced by: Sumire Uesaka
A member of the Russian squad and an acquaintance of Nina Yujik. Her M.O. Operation powers come from the trapdoor spider, which means that alongside Sergei are the main tunnel diggers. She and Ivan are the only surviving members of the Russian squad that manage to return to Earth.
Liu Yiwu (劉 翊武（リュウ イーウ）, Ryū Īu)
Voiced by: Tetsuo Komura (Japanese); Kyle Hebert, Wally Wingert (Revenge) (English)
The leader of the Chinese squad, Hong betrays the Annex I crew under orders to kidnap Akari and Michelle for study. His M.O. procedure grants him powers from the blue-ringed octopus, providing superhuman strength, durability, rapid regeneration, and prehensile, venomous tentacles, complemented by his skill in kempo. After surviving an assassination attempt by his own countrymen, he allies with Komachi and Shōkichi. He ultimately sacrifices his own life on Mars by replacing Shōkichi's destroyed heart with his own to ensure Joseph G. Newton's defeat.
Jet (ジェット, Jetto)
Voiced by: Hidenori Takahashi (Japanese); Christopher Corey Smith (English)
A member of the Chinese squad from Thailand, Jet's M.O. procedure grants him the abilities of the tiger pistol shrimp, enabling him to project powerful shockwaves. He utilizes a specialized suit, the "Yellow Prawn-Goby," which provides full-body omnidirectional sonar for detecting unseen enemies. Skilled in various Southeast Asian martial arts, he is defeated by Akari but spared. Jet later reunites with his surviving squadmates.
Bao Zhilan (爆 致嵐（バオ ツーラン）, Bao Tsūran)
Voiced by: Yūki Ono (Japanese); Mick Wingert (English)
A member of the Chinese squad very skilled in swordsmanship and hand-to-hand combat. It is later revealed that his M.O. Operation powers come from the sea squirt, which means he was cloned many times, and his amoral personality meant neither he or his clones went insane, and each has a different, albeit very similar personality. One of the clones was killed by Joseph, three more were killed by Marcos, the ones that remained dormant inside the Annex were killed by infiltrated Terraformars, while the remaining ones remain with Liu Yiwu. The true original turned out to be with General Kai aboard the Kuzuryu warship. The original Bao is killed once and for all by Sylvester, who punches his head off.
Xi Chun-Li (西 春麗（シィ チュンリー）, Si Chunrī)
Voiced by: Sayaka Ohara
A member of the Chinese squad, Xi's M.O. procedure grants her the abilities of the Pfeffer's flamboyant cuttlefish, allowing her to regenerate limbs and rapidly alter her skin color for near-perfect camouflage. An expert martial artist, she initially attempts to kill Keiji but later cooperates with him to defeat a powerful adversary. She is eventually reunited with Jet and Dorjiberke, boarding the Kuzuryu for the return to Earth.
Hong (紅, Hon)
Voiced by: Nozomi Sasaki (Japanese); Melissa Fahn (English)
The youngest member of the Chinese squad is simple-minded and emotive. Her M.O. procedure uniquely grants her the power of a lethal bacteria, making her a living biological weapon fatal to all unprotected life within a certain radius. She views Xi as an older sister. After being captured, she is eventually released and allowed to return to Earth with her surviving squadmates.
Borgijin Dorjiberke (ボルジギーン・ドルヂバーキ, Borujigīn Dorujibāki)
Voiced by: Takahiro Fujiwara
A member of the Chinese squad from Mongolia, Dorjiberke possesses a keen sense of smell and was nearly conscripted into the Annex Project. His M.O. procedure grants him the abilities of the gray wolf, placing his combat skills on par with Insect-Type crew members. Defeated by the combined efforts of Akari, Yaeko, and Eva, he is later revealed to have survived and reunites with Jet, Hong, and Xi.
Adolf Reinhard (アドルフ・ラインハルト, Adorufu Rainharuto)
Voiced by: Kōji Yusa (Japanese); Doug Erholtz (English)
The leader of the German squad, Adolf has been with U-NASA since childhood after losing his parents to a failed Bugs procedure. He married and had a son, later discovering his wife's infidelity and that he is likely not the boy's biological father. A father-figure to his recruits, his M.O. procedure grants him the abilities of the electric eel, enhancing his strength and durability while allowing him to generate powerful electric shocks. He channels this electricity through throwing knives, enabling attacks that can eliminate large groups of Terraformars.
Eva Frost (エヴァ・フロスト, Eva Furosuto)
Voiced by: Ayane Sakura (Japanese); Cristina Vee (English)
A member of the German squad that befriends Akari, Michelle, Sheila, Marcos and Alex. A good hearted and naive girl, but also clumsy and very emotional, prone to collapsing when panicked, but capable of great courage in dire situations. Her family was very overprotective, controlling and hypochondriac, and after they lost their fortune, they sold her to the U-NASA that forced her to undergo the M.O. Operation. Her powers come from the planarian, and allowed her to fully regenerate from the explosion that killed Adolf and the rest of her squad. By absorbing Adolf's cells she now has his electric powers.
Isabella R. Leon (イザベラ・R・レオン, Izabera R Reon)
Voiced by: Kanako Toujô (Japanese); Cindy Robinson (English)
A member of the German squad, this Brazilian operative acts as a protective older sister to her comrades, including Eva Frost. Her M.O. procedure grants her the abilities of the Sia ferox weevil, resulting in ferocious strength, particularly in her legs, which allows for incredible agility and high jumps. She is killed by a specialized Terraformar.
Joseph Gustav Newton (ジョセフ・グスタフ・ニュートン, Josefu Gusutafu Nyūton)
Voiced by: Akira Ishida (Japanese); Todd Haberkorn (English)
As the leader of the Roma squad, Joseph G. Newton is the product of six centuries of selective breeding, possessing superhuman intellect and strength. His unknown base operation allows him to regenerate limbs and generate electricity. Wielding the same sword as a prior mission's member, he initially assists the Annex I crew against the Terraformars. However, his true motive is to find a suitable mate. After being rejected, he betrays the crew. Following his defeat in combat, his regenerating body is recovered by his family, who intend to use him as a figurehead for a global takeover, though his mind has been shattered by his failure.
Wolf Redfield (ウルフ・レッドフィールド, Urufu Reddofīrudo)
Voiced by: Shinnosuke Tachibana (Japanese); Sean Chiplock (English)
A member of the American squad who aspires to become and engineer, hence the reason why he joined the Annex Project. His M.O. Operation powers come from the hammerhead shark, which gives him the ampullae of Lorenzini, allowing him to detect even the most minimal electric impulses.
Peggy Forty (ペギー・フォーティ, Pegī Fōti)
Voiced by: Emi Hirayama
A member of the American squad. Her M.O. Operation powers come from the echidna, being able to dig in the ground with her claws and to grow needles from her body to pierce her enemies. She was killed by the Demon Dragonfly Terraformar. Her powers were then stolen by the cockroaches.
Erika Nakanojō (中之条 江莉佳, Nakanojou Erika)
Voiced by: Ai Kakuma (Japanese); Stephanie Sheh (English)
A member of the American squad. Her M.O. Operation powers come from the Schlegel's Japanese gecko, which gives her toepads that allows her to adhere to most surfaces without the use of liquids or surface tension.
Amelia Venkatesh (アミリア ヴェンカテッシュ, Amiria Venkatesh)
Voiced by: Eri Kitamura
A member of the American Squad, whose M.O. Operation powers come from the narwhal, growing a horn in her forehead and also allows her to hold her breath for an incredibly long time. She has fallen in love with Keiji. During the infiltration of the Annex, she manages to remain conscious enough to send a message back to Earth, but is only capable of calling for help, incapable of informing about China's betrayal.
Ryuichi and Ryuji Robson (竜一・ロブソン 竜二・ロブソン, Ryuichi Robuson Ryuji Robuson)
Twin brothers members of the American Squad. Their M.O. Operation powers come from the Ogre-faced spider, which allows them to shoot strings from his fingers. However they can shoot those threads only once, which is why they're ranked low. Ryuji is burned alive during the final run towards the evacuation ship, while Ryuichi manages to evacuate.

=== Others ===
Alexander Gustav Newton (アレクサンドル・グスタフ・ニュートン, Arekusandoru Gusutafu Nyūton)
Voiced by: Jouji Nakata
The senior supervisor of the BUGS 2 project, he conceives the Bugs Procedure after his grandson, a BUGS 1 crewmember, sends a Terraformar head to Earth. Monitoring the BUGS 2 mission via internal cameras, he observes the Terraformars adapting to use human firearms and recognizes their unforeseen evolution. He also deduces that the moss originally planted on Mars by human ancestors had been replaced.
Shichisei Hiruma (蛭間 七星, Hiruma Shichisei)
Voiced by: Toshiyuki Morikawa (Japanese); Keith Silverstein (English)
Ichiro's younger brother. He is the major of the Japan Air and Self Defence Force, and deputy commander of the U-NASA's Annex Project.
Kou Honda (本多 晃, Honda Kō)
Voiced by: Hiroshi Yanaka (Japanese); Kyle Hebert (English)
A professor from the Tokyo Institute of Technology who supervised the BUGS 2 mission, he bribed crew members to obtain a Terraformar egg for military purposes. His plan is exposed by Alexander after Victoria's death. Two decades later, he is found in hiding by Shichisei, who briefs him on all subsequent developments. His research and person are then used as leverage to ensure Japan retains the loyalty of other nations in the Annex project and to counter Chinese influence.
Gerald Goodman (グッドマン, Guddoman)
Voiced by: Kenichi Morozumi (Japanese); Todd Haberkorn (English)
The President of the USA in 2620 and an ally of Ichiro Hiruma.
Luke Snorresson (ルーク・スノーレソン, Rūku Sunōreson)
Voiced by: Jūrōta Kosugi
The President of the Roma Federation in 2620, he remains loyal to Japan after a strategic remark from Ichiro Hiruma regarding Professor Kou Honda. He acknowledges that while Hiruma may not be a conventionally bright politician, his tactical patience in waiting for his enemies to reveal themselves demonstrates a keen intelligence.
Petra Eheim (ペトラ・エイハイム, Petora Eihaimu)
Voiced by: Yuuko Tachibana
The Chancellor of Germany in 2620. She chooses to remain loyal to Japan after Ichiro Hiruma casually mentions that he found professor Kou Honda.
Yuriko Minamoto (源 百合子, Minamoto Yuriko)
Voiced by: Haruka Tomatsu (Japanese); Cherami Leigh (English)
An orphan and Akari's childhood friend. She was one of the many infected by the A.E. Virus and needed a transplant in order to live longer, but died 2 days before Akari met Shokichi and Michelle.
Sakurato Harukaze (春風 桜人, Harukaze Sakurato)
Voiced by: Yuzu Aoki (Japanese); Erin Fitzgerald (English)
A ten-year-old boy infected with the A.E. virus, he is befriended by Akari during training at U-NASA. Akari promises to find a cure for him before departing for Mars, despite Michelle's cautions against offering false hope. The boy remains hospitalized at the U-NASA facility.
Gina S. Asimov (ジーナ・S・アシモフ, Jīna S Ashimofu)
Voiced by: Akeno Watanabe (Japanese); Kate Higgins (English)
Sylvester Asimov's daughter and Alexander's wife, she contracted the A.E. virus during her pregnancy. She initially rejected Alexander's advances but eventually fell in love with his perseverance. She is hospitalized at the U-NASA facility.
Rosa Reinhardt (ローザ・ラインハルト, Rōza Rainharuto)
Voiced by: Minako Kotobuki (Japanese); Kate Higgins (English)
Adolf's wife, whom he met during his college days. She cheated on her husband a year before he embarked to Mars, having a child with another man. Despite that, Adolf still cared about her, as he was afraid of losing the only person that made him feel "human".
Jessica Bellwood (ジェシカ・ベルウッド, Jeshika Berūddo)
Voiced by: Yuriko Yamaguchi
A scientist for the German branch of U-NASA, she is the widow of BUGS 1 crewmember Thomas Bellwood. She informs Adolf that he is not the biological father of his son.
Rokka Hiruma (蛭間 六嘉, Hiruma Rokka)
Voiced by: Takahiro Mizushima (Japanese); Kirk Thornton (English)
Ichiro and Shichisei's brother, who was sent to the German Branch of the U-NASA to discuss Akari's powers.
Kai Yanchao (凱延超（カイ・ヤンチャオ）, Kai Yanchao)
A Chinese general and captain of the Kuzuryu Warship sent by his country to capture Akari and Michelle. His M.O. Operation powers come from the Cordyceps fungus, which allows him to manipulate insect brains and make them a 'puppet' by shooting spores from the palm of his hands.

=== Terraformars ===
The Terraformars are humanoid cockroaches standing two meters tall, created by the mysterious Rahab civilization. They possess an innate hostility toward humanity. Their internal anatomy is nearly identical to Earth cockroaches, granting them tremendous speed, strength, and resilience. They can remain mobile even when decapitated if their Suboesophageal ganglion is intact. While initially animalistic, they rapidly adapt; many have incorporated abilities from deceased crewmembers of previous expeditions, mimicking the M.O. Procedure. Evolved Terraformars exhibit high intelligence and complex social organization, rallying from a Martian pyramid. Their advanced intellect allows them to operate technology, infiltrate Earth, and pursue a goal of restoring the Rahab civilization under leaders who employ both martial and scientific strategies.

== Media ==
=== Manga ===
Written by Yū Sasuga and illustrated by Kenichi Tachibana, Terra Formars was first serialized in Shueisha's Miracle Jump magazine from January 13 to December 13, 2011. It later moved to Weekly Young Jump starting on April 26, 2012. The manga entered an indefinite hiatus in December 2018; it resumed in the magazine on April 4, 2024. It entered hiatus again in April 2025, and is set to resume on December 18 of the same year. Shueisha has collected its chapters into individual tankōbon volumes. The first volume was released on April 19, 2012. As of August 19, 2026, 24 volumes have been released.

In North America, the manga has been licensed by Viz Media.

==== Spin-offs ====
The series has inspired seven spin-off manga:

- Terrafo Police (テラフォポリス, Terafo Porisu), written by Manpuku Dō and illustrated by Kaito Shibano. Serialized in Jump X from May 10 to October 10, 2014. Its chapters were collected in a single tankōbon volume, released on November 19, 2014.
- Kyō no Terra Formars wa Oyasumi Desu (今日のテラフォーマーズはお休みです。), a parody manga by Shōta Hattori. Serialized on the Tonari no Young Jump website from June 11, 2014, to October 12, 2016. Its chapters were collected in six tankōbon volumes, released from November 19, 2014, to November 18, 2016.
- Oshiete! Michelle Kyōkan (教えて! ミッシェル教官; lit. Teach Me! Instructor Michelle) an erotic gag series by Serebixi-Ryōsangata. Previewed on Tonari no Young Jump on May 10, 2014, it was serialized in Miracle Jump from June 17 to November 18 of that same year. Its chapters were collected in a single tankōbon volume, released on November 19, 2014.
- Terra Formars Gaiden Rain Hard (テラフォーマーズ外伝 RAIN HARD), by Satoshi Kimura, focused on Adolph Reinhard. Serialized in Ultra Jump from October 18, 2014, to February 19, 2015. Its chapters were collected in a single tankōbon volume, released on February 19, 2015.
- Terra Formars Gaiden Asimov (テラフォーマーズ外伝 アシモフ), by Boichi, focusing on Sylvester Asimov before his trip to Mars. Serialized in Grand Jump from November 4, 2015, to June 15, 2016. Its chapters were collected in two tankōbon volumes, released on March 18 and August 19, 2016.
- Terra Formars Gaiden Keiji Onizuka (テラフォーマーズ外伝 鬼塚慶次), by Saki Nonoyama, focusing on Keiji Onizuka before his trip to Mars. Serialized in Miracle Jump from December 15, 2015, to April 19, 2016. Its chapters were collected in a single tankōbon volume, released on April 19, 2016.
- Terraho-kun (てらほくん), a gag manga series by Forbidden Shibukawa. Serialized in Weekly Young Jump from January 7 to April 14, 2016. Its chapters were collected in a single tankōbon volume, released on May 19, 2016.

==== Volumes ====
No.	Original release date	Original ISBN	English release date	English ISBN
1	April 19, 2012	978-4-08-879270-5	July 15, 2014	978-1-4215-7154-6
2	August 17, 2012	978-4-08-879396-2	September 16, 2014	978-1-4215-7155-3
3	November 19, 2012	978-4-08-879459-4	November 18, 2014	978-1-4215-7156-0
4	February 19, 2013	978-4-08-879523-2	January 20, 2015	978-1-4215-7157-7
5	May 17, 2013	978-4-08-879561-4	March 17, 2015	978-1-4215-7158-4
6	August 19, 2013	978-4-08-879630-7	May 19, 2015	978-14215-7159-1
7	November 19, 2013	978-4-08-879684-0	July 21, 2015	978-1-4215-7798-2
8	February 19, 2014	978-4-08-879754-0	September 15, 2015	978-1-4215-7868-2
9	May 19, 2014	978-4-08-879796-0	November 17, 2015	978-1-4215-7871-2
10	August 20, 2014	978-4-08-879888-2	January 19, 2016	978-1-4215-8078-4
11	November 19, 2014	978-4-08-890042-1	March 15, 2016	978-1-4215-8381-5
12	February 19, 2015	978-4-08-890118-3	May 17, 2016	978-1-4215-8443-0
13	May 19, 2015	978-4-08-890154-1	July 19, 2016	978-1-4215-8521-5
14	August 19, 2015	978-4-08-890245-6	September 20, 2016	978-1-4215-8711-0
15	November 19, 2015	978-4-08-890285-2	November 15, 2016	978-1-4215-9068-4
16	March 18, 2016	978-4-08-890375-0	January 17, 2017	978-1-4215-9069-1
17	April 19, 2016	978-4-08-890398-9	March 21, 2017	978-1-4215-9168-1
18	August 19, 2016	978-4-08-890483-2	July 18, 2017	978-1-4215-9442-2
19	November 18, 2016	978-4-08-890521-1	October 17, 2017	978-1-4215-9580-1
20	February 17, 2017	978-4-08-890587-7	January 2, 2018	978-1-4215-9759-1
21	August 17, 2018	978-4-08-890637-9	July 16, 2019	978-1-9747-0791-1
22	November 19, 2018	978-4-08-891165-6	December 17, 2019	978-1-9747-0955-7
23	July 18, 2024	978-4-08-891203-5	November 18, 2025	978-1-9747-5905-7
24	August 19, 2026	978-4-08-894314-5	—	—

===== Terrafo Police =====
No.	Japanese release date	Japanese ISBN
1	November 19, 2014	978-4-08-890075-9

===== Kyō no Terra Formars wa Oyasumi Desu =====
No.	Japanese release date	Japanese ISBN
1	November 19, 2014	978-4-08-890020-9
2	May 19, 2015	978-4-08-890201-2
3	August 19, 2015	978-4-08-890242-5
4	March 18, 2016	978-4-08-890433-7
5	August 19, 2016	978-4-08-890434-4
6	November 18, 2016	978-4-08-890518-1

===== Oshiete! Michelle Kyōkan =====
No.	Japanese release date	Japanese ISBN
1	November 19, 2014	978-4-08-890050-6

===== Terra Formars Gaiden Rain Hard =====
No.	Japanese release date	Japanese ISBN
1	February 19, 2015	978-4-08-890123-7

===== Terra Formars Gaiden Asimov =====
No.	Japanese release date	Japanese ISBN
1	March 18, 2016	978-4-08-890382-8
2	August 19, 2016	978-4-08-890488-7

===== Terra Formars Gaiden Keiji Onizuka =====
No.	Japanese release date	Japanese ISBN
1	April 19, 2016	978-4-08-890437-5

===== Terraho-kun =====
No.	Japanese release date	Japanese ISBN
1	May 19, 2016	978-4-08-890450-4

=== Anime ===
A 13-episode anime television series adaptation, produced by Liden Films, was broadcast from September 26 to December 19, 2014. The anime is licensed in the United Kingdom by Kazé UK and in North America by Viz Media. Madman Entertainment acquired the series for release in Australia and New Zealand.

A second series, Terra Formars: Revenge, was announced in November 2015, with changes to the series' main staff and the main cast returning to reprise their roles. Liden Films and TYO Animations produced the sequel. The anime premiered on April 2, 2016.

An OVA adaptation of the manga's Earth Arc was planned for a May 2017 release, but was delayed to an August 2018 release instead.

=== Film ===
A live-action film adaptation, directed by Takashi Miike, was announced in February 2015. It was released on April 29, 2016.

=== Novels ===
A novel by Akira Higashiyama, titled Terraformars: Lost Mission I – Memories of the Moon (テラフォーマーズ LOST MISSION I 月の記憶, Tera Fōmāzu Rosuto Misshon Wan Tsuki no Kioku), was published by Shueisha, under its Jump J-Books imprint, on August 20, 2014. A second novel by Yumeaki Hirayama, Terraformars: Lost Mission II – Return to the Sorrowful Mother (テラフォーマーズ LOST MISSION II 悲母への帰還, Tera Fōmāzu Rosuto Misshon Tsu Hibo e no Kikan), started serialization in Miracle Jump on January 19, 2016, and the volume was published on April 19 of that same year.

A three-novel series by Kenichi Fujiwara, titled Terra Formars The Outer Mission (テラフォーマーズ THE OUTER MISSION), was published by Shueisha under its Dash X Bunko from November 21, 2014, to May 25, 2016.

=== Games ===
A Nintendo 3DS game developed by FuRyu, titled Terra Formars: Akaki Hoshi no Gekitō (テラフォーマーズ 紅き惑星の激闘; 'Terra Formars: The Fierce Battle on the Crimson Planet'), was released on April 2, 2015. A pachislot game machine, Pachislot Terra Formars (ぱちスロ テラフォーマーズ, Pachisuro Tera Fōmāzu), developed by Kyoraku, was released in Japan on June 20, 2016, with an early access for iPhone and Android devices on June 16.

== Reception ==
The sixth volume reached the number one place on the Oricon weekly manga chart in the week of August 19–25, 2013, with 317,248 copies. By February 2015, the 11 first volumes of Terra Formars had over 10 million copies in circulation; the manga had sold 13 million copies by August 2015; it had over 16 million copies in print by April 2018; and over 21 million copies in print by November 2018.

Terra Formars was number one on the 2013 Kono Manga ga Sugoi! Top 20 Manga for Male Readers survey. It was placed second in the 2013 Zenkoku Shotenin ga Eranda Osusume Comic, a ranking of the top 15 manga recommended by Japanese bookstores. It was also nominated for the sixth Manga Taishō in the same year.
