= List of Kuroko's Basketball chapters =

The manga series Kuroko's Basketball is written and illustrated by Tadatoshi Fujimaki. It has been published in Shueisha shōnen magazine Weekly Shōnen Jump since 2008 and concluded on its 40th issue on September 1, 2014. The individual chapters are published in tankōbon by Shueisha. The first volume published on April 3, 2009, and as of December 4, 2014, all 30 volumes have been released with the 30th and final volume released on that date. A sequel was released on December 29, 2014, on the magazines Jump Next imprint. Viz Media has licensed the manga for North American and will publish the manga in 2-in-1 editions beginning in 2016.

The manga was adapted into an anime series by Production I.G, which aired on Mainichi Broadcasting System, with the first episode shown on April 7, 2012. The series ran for three seasons.

== Volumes list ==
No.	Title	Original release date	English release date
1	I'm Kuroko; Kuroko wa Boku desu (黒子はボクです)	April 3, 2009; 978-4-08-874694-4	August 2, 2016; 978-1-42-158771-4
001. "I'm Kuroko" (黒子はボクです, Kuroko wa Boku desu); 002. "Monday, 8:40a.m. on the Roof!" (月曜朝8:40の屋上ね！, Getsuyō Asa Hachiji Yonjūpun no Okujō ne!); 003. "I Am Serious" (本気です, Honki desu); 004. "He Might Not Be Normal" (まともじゃないかもしんないスね, Matomo Janai Kamo Shinnaisu ne); 005. "It's Not Just for Show" (伊達じゃないですよ, Date Janai desu yo); 006. "Unbeatable is Just Right" (勝てねェぐらいがちょうどいい, Katenē Gurai ga Chōdo Ii); 007. "Revenge is Up to You!" (逆襲よろしく！, Gyakushū Yoroshiku!)
2	Your Basketball; Omae no Basuke (おまえのバスケ)	July 3, 2009; 978-4-08-874704-0	August 2, 2016; 978-1-42-158771-4
008. "I'm Off" (行ってきます, Ittekimasu); 009. "I Made a Promise" (約束しました, Yakusoku Shimashita); 010. "Man Proposes, God Disposes" (「人事を尽くして天命を待つ」, Jinji o Tsukushite Tenmei o Matsu); 011. "Your Basketball" (おまえのバスケ, Omae no Basuke); 012. "Bring It Back♡" (買ってきて♡, Kattekite); 013. "Let's Go!!" (行くぞ!!, Ikuzo!!); 014. "Two Things" (2つ言っておくぜ, Futatsu Itteokuze); 015. "Helluva Lot Stronger!!" (断然強ーわ!!, Danzen Tsuē wa!!); 016. "We'll See Something Incredible" (すごいもん見れるわよ, Sugoi Mon Mireru wa yo)
3	In Order To Win; Katsu Tame ni (勝つために)	September 4, 2009; 978-4-08-874731-6	October 4, 2016; 978-1-42-158772-1
017. "Doesn't It Fire You Up?" (燃えません？, Moemasen?); 018. "Let's Give It a Look" (ちょっと見せてもらおうぜ, Chotto Misete Moraōze); 019. "It Made Me Realize" (改めて思いました, Aratamete Omoimashita); 020. "It Will Be Alright" (大丈夫です, Daijōbu desu); 021. "We Got Over It" (乗り越えたし, Norikoetashi); 022. "Don't Worry" (心配すんな, Shinpai Sunna); 023. "In Order To Win" (勝つために, Katsu Tame ni); 024. "We Killed It" (オシャカにしたんで, Oshaka ni Shitande); 025. "Well Then..." (さぁ..., Saa...)
4	What is "Victory"? "Shōri" tte Nan desu ka (「勝利」ってなんですか)	November 4, 2009; 978-4-08-874754-5	October 4, 2016; 978-1-42-158772-1
026. "It Would Be a Problem" (困ります, Komarimasu); 027. "He's a Veteran" (百戦錬磨だ, Hyakusen Renma da); 028. "Sorry" (すまないな, Sumanai na); 029. "That Ain't All, Is It?" (そんなもんじゃねえだろ, Sonna Mon Janee Daro); 030. "I'm a Leo" (獅子座だよ, Shishiza dayo); 031. "I'll Win!!" (勝つんだ!!, Katsunda!!); 032. "What is "Victory"?" (「勝利」ってなんですか, "Shōri" tte Nandesuka); 033. "Charge!!" (行くぜ!!, Ikuze!!); 034. "That's What I Mean By "Man Proposes"." (それが人事を尽くすということだ, Sore ga Jinji o Tsukusu to Iu Koto da)
5	I Knew It; Shinjitemashita (信じてました)	January 4, 2010; 978-4-08-874789-7	December 6, 2016; 978-1-42-158773-8
035. "I Knew It" (信じてました, Shinjitemashita); 036. "Let's...Play Again" (また...やりましょう, Mata...Yarimashō); 037. "Idiots Can't Win!" (バカじゃ勝てないのよ！, Baka ja Katenai no yo!); 038. "I've Come" (来ちゃいました, Kichaimashita); 039. "They're So Alike" (そっくりだね, Sokkuri da ne); 040. "Don't Make Me Laugh" (笑わせんなよ, Warawasenna yo); 041. "That's Tea" (お茶です, Ocha desu); 042. "Just an Appetizer" (前座や, Zenza ya); 043. "I Had It" (とれました, Toremashita)
6	Hell No!! Iyada!! (嫌だ!!)	April 2, 2010; 978-4-08-870024-3	December 6, 2016; 978-1-42-158773-8
044. "She Wouldn't Do Something Like That" (そんなタマではないだろう, Sonna Tama de wa Nai Darō); 045. "Let's Go" (やろーか, Yarō ka); 046. "Not Bad" (いーじゃねーか, Ii Janeeka); 047. "Leave It to Me" (まかせとけ, Makasetoke); 048. "They're All Crazy" (ふざけた奴ばっかりだ, Fuzaketa Yatsu Bakkari da); 049. "Let's Finish This" (決着つけようぜ, Kecchaku Tsukeyōze); 050. "Your Basketball" (おまえのバスケ, Omae no Basuke); 051. "Hell No!!" (嫌だ!!, Iyada!!); 052. "To a New Challenge" (新しい挑戦へ, Atarashii Chōsen e)
7	Let's Begin; Hajimeru wa yo (始めるわよ)	June 4, 2010	February 7, 2017; 978-1-42-158774-5
053. "May I Ask Who You Are?" (どちら様ですか, Dochira-sama desu ka); 054. "That's Why I Don't Like Him" (だからアイツはヤなんだ, Dakara Aitsu wa Yananda); 055. "That's Talent For Ya" (これが実力だ, Kore ga Jitsuryoku da); 056. "Throw It Away" (捨てることだ, Suteru Koto da); 057. "Not "Want"." (なりたいじゃねーよ, Naritai Janē yo); 058. "Leave It To Me!" (まかせて！, Makasete!); 059. "Let's Begin" (始めるわよ, Hajimeru wa yo); 060. "Don't Make Me Laugh" (笑わせるな, Warawaseruna); 061. "Try Jumping" (跳んでみて, Tonde Mite)
8	I Know What I Have To Do!! Yaru Koto wa Kimatta!! (やることは決まった!!)	August 4, 2010	February 7, 2017; 978-1-42-158774-5
062. "I Know What I Have To Do!!" (やることは決まった!!, Yaru Koto wa Kimatta!!); Special Chapter. "-Tip off-" (-Tip off-, Tippu-Ofu); 063. "I'll Win Even If It Kills Me, Though" (死んでも勝つっスけど, Shindemo Katsussu Kedo); 064. "Not That Grown-Up" (大人じゃねーよ!, Otona Janē yo!); 065. "Who Was It" (誰だと思ってんスか, Dareda to Omottensuka); 066. "One Warning" (一つ忠告しとくわ, Hitotsu Chuukoku Shitokuwa); 067. "I Quit" (やめる, Yameru); 068. "It Wouldn't Be Strange" (おかしくないと思います, Okashikunai to Omoimasu); 069. "Who Knows?" (どうなるんスかね, Dōnarunsuka ne); 070. "Cut the Crap!" (カン違いしてんじゃねーよ！, Kanchigai Shitenjanē yo!)
9	At the Winter Cup; Uintā Kappu de (ウインターカップで)	October 4, 2010; 978-4-08-870115-8	April 4, 2017; 978-1-42-158775-2
071. "They're Pretty Scary" (恐ろしいもんやで, Osoroshii Mon ya de); 072. "Quit Being Obvious" (当たり前なこと言ってんじゃねーよ, Atari Mae na Koto Ittenjanē yo); 073. "Make Him Pay" (返せ, Kaese); 074. "I Brought Him Home" (拾いました, Hiroimashita); 075. "I Never Expected To See You Here" (こんな所で合うとはな, Konna Tokoro de Au to wa na); 076. "Like a Big Brother" (兄キかな, Aniki kana); 077. "I've Made Up My Mind!!" (腹は決めた!!, Hara wa Kimeta!!); 078. "Come Play a Bit" (ちょっとまざってけよ, Chotto Mazatteke yo); 079. "At the Winter Cup" (ウインターカップで, Uintā Kappu de); 080. "Watch Me" (見てて下さい, Mitete Kudasai)
10	Go! Shidō!!! (始動!!!)	December 3, 2010; 978-4-08-870151-6	April 4, 2017; 978-1-42-158775-2
081. "Go!" (始動!!!, Shidō!!!); 082. "Let's Have Some Fun~" (楽しんでこーぜ, Tanoshindekōze); 083. "Please Let Them Know "This Means War"" (宣戦布告お願いします, Sensen Fukoku Onegaishimasu); 084. "You Mean "Finally"" (やっとだろうが, Yatto Darō ga); 085. "Once is Enough" (一度でたくさんだ, Ichido de Takusan da); 086. "There's Obviously Only One Answer" (答えは一つに決まっている, Kotae wa Hitotsu ni Kimatteiru); 087. "Strong Doesn't Cut It" (手強いなんてもんじゃねぇ, Tegowai Nante Mon Janee); 088. "Run!!" (走るぞ!!, Hashiruzo!!); 089. "I've Been Waiting" (待ってたぜ, Mattetaze)
11	We're the Seirin High School Basketball Club! Seirin Kōkō Basuke-bu da!! (誠凜高校バスケ部だ!!)	March 4, 2011; 978-4-08-870192-9	June 6, 2017; 978-1-42-159110-0
090. "All Right...Show 'em!" (さぁ...お披露目よ！, Saa...Ohirome yo!); 091. "Passed It Long Ago" (とうの昔に超えている, Tō no Mukashi ni Koeteiru); 092. "Game Over" (試合終了, Shiai Shūryō); 093. "You're On" (望むところです, Nozomu Tokoro desu); 094. "Clean-Up!" (お片付けといきますか！, Okatazuke to Ikimasuka!); 095. "Then Let's Make One" (じゃあ創ろうぜ, Jaa Tsukurōze); 096. "Give It Up" (諦めろ, Akiramero); 097. "We're the Seirin High School Basketball Club!" (誠凜高校バスケ部だ!!, Seirin Kōkō Basuke-bu da!!); 098. "I'm Glad I Met You" (出会えてよかった, Deaete Yokatta); 099. "I'll Be Right Back" (すぐ戻る, Sugu Modoru)
12	Trust; Shinrai da (信頼だ)	May 2, 2011; 978-4-08-870222-3	June 6, 2017; 978-1-42-159110-0
100. "How Couldn't I Be Fired Up?" (燃えないわけがねーぜ, Moenai Wake ga Nē ze); 101. "Definitely Beat You" (必ず倒す, Kanarazu Taosu); 102. "That's Why I Decided" (だからオレは決めたんだ, Dakara Ore wa Kimetanda); 103. "You're Gonna Lose" (負けんぞ, Makenzo); 104. "That's the Trap" (それが罠や, Sore ga Wana ya); 105. "Trust" (信頼だ, Shinrai da); 106. "I Get That Feeling" (そんな気がすんだ, Sonna Kigasunda); 107. "Quit Screwing Around" (ふざけるな, Fuzakeruna); 108. "I Got Tired of Waiting" (待ちくたびれたぜ, Machikutabiretaze)
13	Never Again; Kondo wa Mō Zettai ni (今度はもう絶対に)	July 4, 2011; 978-4-08-870258-2	August 1, 2017; 978-1-42-159111-7
109. "It's Been a While" (久しぶりだな, Hisashiburi dana); 110. "Break a Leg" (よろしゅうたのむわ, Yoroshū Tanomu wa); 111. "We're Gonna Start Like This" (このまま始めるわよ, Kono Mama Hajimeru wa yo); 112. "The Winter Cup Will Recommence" (ウインターカップを再開します, Uintā Kappu o Saikaishimasu); 113. "Sorry To Keep You Waiting" (待たせたね, Mataseta ne); 114. "Never Again" (今度はもう絶対に, Kondo wa Mō Zettai ni); 115. "Take the Lead!!" (主導権とれ!!, Shudōken Tore!); 116. "That's Insulting" (心外です, Shingai desu); 117. "Only When He's in Top Form!!" (絶好調の時だけだ!!, Zekkōchō no Toki Dake da!!)
14	This Time I'll; Kondo wa Ore ga (今度はオレが)	October 4, 2011; 978-4-08-870295-7	August 1, 2017; 978-1-42-159111-7
118. "He Hates to Lose" (負けず嫌いやからな, Makezugirai Yakarana); 119. "Good, We Can Keep It Short" (話が早くて助かるぜ, Hanashiga Hayakute Tasukaruze); 120. "It's Useless" (無駄な努力だ, Mudana Doryokuda); 121. "This Time I'll" (今度はオレが, Kondo wa Orega); 122. "Mind Leaving It to Me" (オレに任せてくれないすか, Ore ni Makasete Kurenaisuka); 123. "I Think He's Extremely Happy" (嬉しくてしょうがないと思います, Ureshikute Shoganai to Omoimasu); 124. "You'll Catch a Chill" (ただもう一度, Tada Mō ichido); 125. "Comeback Time!" (逆転だよ!, Gyakutendayo!); 126. "We Should Get Along" (仲良くしようや, Nakayoku Shiyōya)
15	I Believe in Him; Shinjitemasukara (信じてますから)	December 12, 2011; 978-4-08-870317-6	October 3, 2017; 978-1-42-159112-4
127. "They've Got Nothing Left" (万策尽きた, Bansaku Tsukita); 128. "We Win Now!" (今勝つんだ！, Ima Katsunnda!); 129. "Better Than Losing Here" (ここで負けるよりマシです, Kokode Makeruyori Mashidesu); 130. "The Fourth and Final Quarter!!!" (最終第4Q!!!, Saishū Dai Yon Kuōtā!); 131. "We Trust 'em" (信じてるぜ, Shinjiteruze); 132. "I Can't Stop You, Aomine-kun" (青峰君を止めることはできません, Aominekun o Tomerukoto wa Dekimasen); 133. "I Have to Thank Ya" (感謝するぜ, Kanshasuruze); 134. "But the Best is Still" (それでも最強は, Soredemo Saikyo wa); 135. "I Believe in Him" (信じてますから, Shinjitemasukara)
16	Game Over; Taimu Appu‼ (試合終了(タイムアップ)‼)	March 2, 2012; 978-4-08-870372-5	October 3, 2017; 978-1-42-159112-4
136. "I'll Win!!" (絶(ぜっ)対(てー)勝(か)つ！！, Zettē Katsu!!); 137. "Like I'd Lose" (負けるかよ, Makerukayo); 138. "But the One I Believe in is" (信じてるのは, Shinjiteru no wa); 139. "Game Over!!" (試合終了(タイムアップ)！！, Taimu Appu!!); 140. "I'm Real Glad" (本当によかった, Hontō ni Yokatta); 141. "Nice to Meet You!" (Nice to Meet You! (よろしくな！）, Nice To Meet You! (Yoroshikuna!)); 142. "Please Teach Me" (教えてください, Oshietekudasai); 143. "It Couldn't be Easy" (軽いものなはずないだろう, Karui mono na Hazunaidarō); 144. "It'll Be Fun" (楽しみじゃい, Tanoshimijai)
17	Tip-Off!! Tippu-Ofu!! (試合開始(ティップオフ)‼)	April 4, 2012; 978-4-08-870404-3	December 5, 2017; 978-1-42-159113-1
145. "Tip Off!!" (試合開始(ティップオフ)‼, Tippu Ofu!!); 146. "Let's Stop One" (止めよーかい, Tomeyōkai); 147. "I'll Guard It!!" (オレが守る！！, Orega Mamoru!!); 148. "First Score!!" (初得点！！, Hatsutokuten!!); 149. "That's Not Gonna Cut It" (付け焼刃じゃ張れねーよ, Tsukeyakibaja Harenē yo); 150. "Leave It to Us!!" (まかせとけ！！, Makasetoke!!); 151. "And Crush Him" (叩きつぶしたいんだよ, Tataki Tsubushitainndayo); 152. "Breaking the Aegis" (絶対防御破(イージスの盾やぶ)りだ, Ījisu no Tate Yaburida); 153. "No Question" (決まってらぁ, Kimatterā)
18	I'm Glad I've Come This Far; Yattete Yokattayo (やっててよかったよ)	July 4, 2012; 978-4-08-870430-2	December 5, 2017; 978-1-42-159113-1
154. "I Get It...!!" (わかったぜ．．．！！, Wakattaze...!!); 155. "I'll Squash You" (ヒネリつぶしてやるよ, Hineri Tsubushiteyaruyo); 156. "Nothing but Garbage" (ただのゴミだ, Tadano Gomida); 157. "Please Win" (勝ってくれ, Kattekure); 158. "I Don't Want to Lose!" (負けたくない！, Maketakunai!); 159. "Where'd He Go!?" (どこいった！？, Dokoitta!?); 160. "I'm Glad I've Come This Far" (やっててよかったよ, Yatteteyokatta yo); 161. "Quit Screwing Around!" (なめてるっつーんだよ！, Nameteruttsūn da yo!); 162. "Who the Hell Are You?" (あんた誰？, Anta Dare?)
19	The Light of Seirin; Seirin no Ēsu (誠凜のエース(光))	September 4, 2012; 978-4-08-870499-9	February 6, 2018; 978-1-42-159518-4
163. "The Light of Seirin" (誠(せい)凜(りん)のエース(光), Seirin no Ēsu); 164. "Somthin' to See" (見物だぜ, Mimonodaze); 165. "I'm Done" (もういいや, Mō Ii ya); 166. "Win!!" (勝つ！！！, Katsu!!!); 167. "It's Showtime!" (正念場だ！！, Shōnenbada!); 168. "It's Over!!" (終わりだ！！, Owarida!!); 169. "That's That" (そーゆーことだろ, Sōyūkotodaro); 170. "Just Killin' Time" (ただのヒマつぶしだ, Tadano Himatsubushida); 171. "It's Mine" (俺のもんだ, Oreno Monda)
20	I Don't Know; Ore wa Shiranai (オレは知らない)	December 4, 2012; 978-4-08-870535-4	February 6, 2018; 978-1-42-159518-4
172. "Don't Get in My Way...!" (ジャマすんじゃねーよ．．．！, Jamasun'n Janē yo...!); 173. "Give It Up" (やめとけよ, Yametoke yo); 174. "I'll Take 'em" (もらっとくわ, Morattokuwa); 175. "I'll Teach You" (教えてやる, Oshite Yaru); 176. "That's All It Is" (それだけのことだよ, Soredake no Kotoda yo); 177. "I Don't Know" (オレは知らない, Ore wa Shiranai); 178. "You'll Find Out Soon Enough" (すぐにわかるよ, Sugu ni Wakaru yo); 179. "He Has Not Given Up" (諦めていません, Akiramete Imasen); 180. "They're Similar to You Guys" (似てんなお前らと, Nitenna Omaera to)
21	The True Light; Shin no Hikari (真の光)	February 4, 2013; 978-4-08-870618-4	April 3, 2018; 978-1-42-159519-1
181. "I'll Give Them To You" (差し出そう, Sashidasō); 182. "You Won't Reach" (届かない, Todokanai); 183. "Now Let's Go" (さあ行こう, Sā Ikō); 184. "Strike First For Certain Victory!" (先手必勝!, Sente Hisshō!); 185. "I Can't Help But Laugh" (笑っちゃいますね, Waratcha Imasu ne); 186. "It's Your Time To Shine!" (出番よ!, Deban yo!); 187. "You Have Teammates, You Know" (仲間がいるでしょーが, Chīmumeito ga Irudeshō ga); 188. "It's Pointless To Say Anything" (言うだけヤボだ, Iu Dake Yaboda); 189. "The True Light" (真の光, Shin no Hikari)
22	Don't Underestimate Us!! Name'n Janē!! (ナメんじゃねぇ!!)	May 2, 2013; 978-4-08-870649-8	April 3, 2018; 978-1-42-159519-1
190. "That's Why I'll Go All Out" (だから全力でやる, Dakara Zenryoku de Yaru); 191. "You're Completely Visible" (丸見えだぜ, Marumieda ze); 192. "Got Any Complaints?" (なんか文句あんのか, Nanka Monkuan no ka); 193. "Don't Underestimate Us!!" (ナメんじゃねぇ!!, Name'n Janē!!); 194. "In Order To Win" (勝った目に, Katta Me ni); 195. "It's The Climax" (最高潮だ, Kuraimakkusu da); 196. "We Can't Let Our Guard Down For A Second" (一瞬も気は抜けなそーだ, Isshun mo Ki wa Nukena Sō da); 197. "They'll Get Devoured" (飲み込まれるぞ, Nomikoma Reruzo); 198. "This Time, For Sure" (今度こそ, Kondo Koso)
23	A Day Of Clear Blue Skies; Aoi Sora no Hi (「青い空の日」)	August 2, 2013; 978-4-08-870785-3	June 5, 2018; 978-1-42-159612-9
199. "A Near-Impossible Feat" (至難の業だ, Shinan no Waza da); 200. "I've Found The Answer" (答えは出ました, Kotae wa Demashita); 201. "It's According To Plan" (狙い通りだよ, Nerai-dōrida yo); 202. "I Never Expected..." (思いませんでした, Omoimasendeshita); 203. "He's An Amazing Player" (最高の選手です, Saikō no Senshu desu); 204. "A Day Of Clear Blue Skies" (「青い空の日」, Aoi Sora no Hi); 205. "I No Longer Know" (わからないんです, Wakaranai'n desu); 206. "It's Up To Him" (彼しだいさ, Kare-shidai sa); 207. "Welcome" (ようこそ, Yōkoso)
24	Let's Go; Ikōze (行こうぜ)	October 4, 2013; 978-4-08-870819-5	June 5, 2018; 978-1-42-159612-9
208. "I'm Alright" (大丈夫です, Daijōbu desu); 209. "You Can Do It!" (できるさ!, Dekiru-sa!); 210. "I Already Knew" (わかってたこった, Wakatteta Kotta); 211. "1 See You" (じゃーな, Jā'na); 212. "I Feel Like I Can't Lose" (負ける気がしねぇ, Makeru ki ga Shinē); 213. "The Lion And The Rabbit" (獅子搏兎, Shishi Hakuto); 214. "I'm Looking Forward To It!" (楽しみだ!, Tanoshimida!); 215. "Let's Do Our Best" (がんばりましゃう, Ganbari Mashau); 216. "... Sorry" (・・・ワリィ, ...Warī); 217. "Let's Go" (行こうぜ, Ikōze)
25	What Is Victory? Shōri tte nan desu ka? (勝利ってなんですか?)	December 4, 2013; 978-4-08-870851-5	August 7, 2018; 978-1-42-159613-6
218. "Even If It's Just For Now" (せめて今だけでも, Semete Ima Dake Demo); 219. "Thank You Very Much" (ありがとうございます, Arigatōgozaimasu); 220. "I've Forgotten" (忘れちまった, Wasure Chimatta); 221. "Te... Tsu... Ya." (テツヤ, Tetsuya); 222. "We're No Longer..." (僕らはもう, Bokura wa Mō); 223. "... I'm The Worst" (・・・・・・最低です, ......Saitei desu); 224. "I'm... Envious" (・・・いいなぁ, ...Ī nā); 225. "What Business Do You Have?" (何か用か?, Nani ka Yō ka?); 226. "What Is Victory?" (勝利ってなんですか?, Shōritte Nandesu ka?); 227. "I Am Kuroko" (黒子はボクです, Kuroko wa Boku desu)
26	The Final Tip-Off!! Fainaru Tippu-Ofu!! (決勝戦(ファイナル)試合開始(ティップオフ)‼)	March 4, 2014; 978-4-08-880025-7	August 7, 2018; 978-1-42-159613-6
228. "We've Been Friends This Whole Time" (とっくに仲間だろーが, Tokku ni Sōdarō ga); 229. "I'm Going" (行ってきます, Ittekimasu); 230. "I Accept Your Challenge" (受けてやろう, Ukete Yarou); 231. "It Begins" (始めます, Hajimemasu); 232. "The Final Tip-Off!!" (決勝戦(ファイナル)試合開始(ティップオフ)‼, Fainaru Tippu-Ofu!!); 233. "Isn't This Kinda Bad For Him?" (やばくねーか?, Yabaku nē ka?); 234. "It's Now Or Never" (待ったなしゃ, Matta'nasha); 235. "This Is Best, Isn't It?" (最高じゃねーの?, Saikō Janē no?); 236. "They've... Been Broken...!?" (破られた・・・!?, Yaburareta...!?)
27	A Miracle Won't Happen 'Kiseki wa Okinai (奇跡は起きない)	May 2, 2014; 978-4-08-880057-8	October 2, 2018; 978-1-42-159614-3
237. "Don't You Think It's Naive?" (甘いんじゃない?, Amai'n Janai?); 238. "Isn't He The Spitting Image Of...?" (そっくりじゃねぇか, Sokkuri Janē ka); 239. "I Am All The More Pleased" (気に入った, Kiniitta); 240. "Super Serious" (大マジメさ, Dai Majime-sa); 241. "It's So Frustrating..." (悔しいよ・・・, Kuyashī yo...); 242. "I'll Show You Something N.I.C.E. ♥" (いいもの見せてア・ゲ・ル♡, Ī Mono Misete A.GE.RU ♡); 243. "I've Already Won" (私の勝ちね, Watashi no Kachi ne); 244. "That Was Bad" (アカンやろ, Akan Yaro); 245. "A Miracle Won't Happen" (奇跡は起きない, Kiseki wa Okinai)
28	The Weight Of Determination; Kakugo no Omosa (覚悟の重さ)	July 4, 2014; 978-4-08-880136-0	October 2, 2018; 978-1-42-159614-3
246. "Not Good Enough" (まだだよ, Madada yo); 247. "I Won't Accept It" (いやだ, Iyada); 248. "I Don't Feel Like Surrendering It Yet" (まだゆずる気はありません, Mada Yuzuru Ki wa Arimasen); 249. "It All Starts Here" (こっからだぜ, Kokkarada ze); 250. "The Weight Of Determination" (覚悟の重さ, Kakugo no Omo-sa); 251. "I Still Have A Use For You" (まだ必要だ, Mada Hitsuyō da); 252. "A Llama Once Told Me" (ラクダが言いました, Rakuda ga Iimashita); 253. "Leave This To Me" (任せてくれ, Makasete Kure); 254. "I Can't Match Him" (敵わない, Kanawanai)
29	I'll Definitely Stop This Shot!! Zettai Tomete Yaru (絶対止めてやる)	October 3, 2014; 978-4-08-880174-2	December 4, 2018; 978-1-42-159615-0
255. "We're Gonna Do Our Best" (これでも必死だよ, Kore Demo Hisshida yo); 256. "I'm Doing All That I Can Like This" (これでも必死だよ, Kore Demo Hisshida yo); 257. "Let's Do This, Rakuzan!!" (行くぜ洛山!!, Ikuze Rakuzan!!); 258. "We Can't Stop You Anymore" (もう止めねーよ, Mō Tomenē yo); 259. "I'll Definitely Stop This Shot!!" (絶対止めてやる, Zettai Tomete Yaru); 260. "A Word of Advice" (忠告だ, Chūkokuda); 261. "That's Enough" (十分だろ, Jūbundaro); 262. "Why Don't You Give Up?" (諦めませんか, Akiramemasen ka); 263. "Please Stop Akashi!!" (赤司を止めてくれぇ!!, Akashi o Tomete Kurē!!)
30	However Many Times; Nando Demo (何度でも)	December 4, 2014; 978-4-08-880211-4	December 4, 2018; 978-1-42-159615-0
264. "It Is The First Time!!" (初めてじゃないかな, Hajimete Janai ka na); 265. "Since We Don't Have The Leisure For That" (そんな余裕はないですから, Son'na Yoyū Wanaidesu Kara); 266. "Who Are You?" (誰だお前, Dareda Omae); 267. "It's Been A While, Hasn't It?" (久しぶりだね, Hisashiburida ne); 268. "What Can They Do Against This?" (どうすりゃいいんだ, Dō Surya Ī'nda); 269. "Don't Give Up!!" (諦めるな!!, Akirameru na!!); 270. "So It Was You All Along" (お前だったんじゃねーか, Omae Dattan Janē ka); 271. "One Hundred Years Too Early" (百年早い, Hyaku-nen Hayai); 272. "Risk It All!!" (すべてを懸けろ!!, Subete o Kakero!!); 273. "This Is The Final Play" (これが最後のプレイだ, Kore ga Saigo no Purei da); 274. "Match's End" (試合終了, Taimu Appu); 275. "However Many Times" (何度でも, Nando Demo)
