= List of Naruto chapters (Part II, volumes 49–72) =

The cover of the third box set of the Naruto manga, the second, and final half of the Part II storyline.

The plot of the Naruto manga series, written and illustrated by Masashi Kishimoto, is divided in to two; the second part is known as Part II. The series is about the eponymous character Naruto Uzumaki who wants recognition and respect from the fellow villagers, and to become the Hokage, the leader of Konohagakure. Part II, set two-and-a-half years after the conclusion of Part I, follows the return of the ninja Uzumaki to Konohagakure from two-and-a-half years of training. As he returns, he continues his goal of convincing his best friend Sasuke Uchiha to return with him and his other friends back to Konohagakure.

Naruto was published in individual chapters by Shueisha in Weekly Shōnen Jump and later collected in tankōbon format with extra content. The manga series was first published in issue 43 of 1999, with Part II beginning in issue 19 of 2005. Volume 49 was published on January 4, 2010, and the final volume, 72, was published on February 4, 2015.

An anime adaptation of Part II, produced by Studio Pierrot and TV Tokyo, premiered on February 15, 2007, on TV Tokyo as Naruto: Shippuden (NARUTO -ナルト- 疾風伝, Naruto: Shippūden; literally, Naruto: Hurricane Chronicles). The episodes began airing immediately after the end of the original Naruto anime, which had been showing filler episodes to widen the plot gap between the anime and the manga.

The English version (serialization) of the Naruto manga, licensed by Viz Media, is published in North America in the Weekly Shonen Jump digital magazine and was originally serialized in the defunct monthly Shonen Jump print magazine. English-language trade volumes are published digitally and in print on Viz Media's Viz Manga website. To compensate for occasional gaps between the manga's Japanese and English adaptations, Viz Media has periodically published several volumes in a short period of time. Volume 49 was published in English on October 5, 2010, and volume 72 on October 6, 2015. The third box set containing the volumes from the second half of Part II was released in the United States by Viz Media on January 5, 2016.

== Volume list ==
No.	Title	Original release date	English release date
49	The Gokage Summit Commences; Gokage kaidan, kaimaku...!! (五影会談、開幕...!!)	January 4, 2010; 978-4-08-874784-2	October 5, 2010; 978-1-4215-3475-6
454. "Enter the Gokage...!!" (五影登場...!!, "Gokage tōjō...!!"); 455. "Links...!!" (繋がり...!! "Tsunagari...!!"); 456. "Naruto Heads Out...!!" (ナルト出発...!! "Naruto shuppatsu...!!"); 457. "The Gokage Summit Commences!!" (五影会談、開幕...!! "Gokage kaidan, kaimaku...!!"); 458. "The Great Gokage Debate...!!" (五影の大論戦...!! "Gokage no daironsen...!!"); 459. "Sakura's Resolve!!" (サクラの決意!! "Sakura no ketsui!!"); 460. "Trapping Sasuke...!!" (サスケ包囲網...! "Sasuke hōimō...!"); 461. "Kumogakure vs. Taka!!" (雲隠れVS“鷹”!!); 462. "Sasuke's Shinobi Way...!!" (サスケの忍道...!! "Sasuke no nindō...!!"); 463. "Sasuke vs. Raikage!!" (サスケVS雷影!!)
The five Kage gather to decide how to keep the remaining tailed beasts away from the Akatsuki. Naruto Uzumaki, Kakashi Hatake and Yamato also attend in secret, hoping to convince the Kage to forgive Sasuke Uchiha for his crimes; Sai, Sakura Haruno, Lee and Kiba follow in an attempt to tell Naruto about their comrades' decision to kill Sasuke themselves. While Naruto is resting, Taka arrives at the Kage meeting to kill Danzo (a conspirator in the Uchiha clan's assassination). Their presence is soon discovered, and the Kage mobilize to deal with them. The Raikage, believing that the Akatsuki still has Killer Bee, fights Sasuke. Madara has a brief confrontation with Naruto and tells him the truth about the Uchiha clan.
50	Water Prison Death Match; Suirō no shitō!! (水牢の死闘!!)	March 4, 2010; 978-4-08-870011-3	February 1, 2011; 978-1-4215-3497-8
464. "The Power of Darkness...!!" (闇の力...!!, "Yami no chikara...!!"); 465. "The Summit Hall Attacked!" (会談場襲撃! "Kaidanjō shūgeki!"); 466. "The Great Battle in the Sealed Room!!" (密室の大攻防戦!! "Misshitsu no daikōbōsen!!"); 467. "Declaration of War" (宣戦 "Sensen"); 468. "Eight Tails and Nine Tails" (八尾と九尾 "Hachibi to Kyūbi"); 469. "The Confession!!" (サクラの告白!! "Sakura no kokuhaku!!"); 470. "Killer Bee vs. Kisame!!" (キラービーVS鬼鮫!! "Kirābī VS Kisame!!"); 471. "Eight Tails Version 2!!" (八尾、バージョン2!! "Hachibi, Bājon Tsū!!"); 472. "Water Prison Death Match!!" (水牢の死闘!! "Suirō no shitō!!"); 473. "Bro" (ブラザー "Burazā")
Unable to defeat the Raikage and his allies, Sasuke flees. He tries to focus his efforts on Danzo, but the other Kage intervene and defeat him. Danzo leaves the Kage when he is revealed to be manipulating them with a Sharingan. His life is saved by Madara Uchiha, who asks the Kage to give him Killer Bee and Naruto so he can use the tailed beasts to control the world. The Kage refuse, and he declares war against them. Madara disappears with Sasuke, and the Kage join forces against the Akatsuki. As they begin preparing for battle, Kisame Hoshigaki finds Killer Bee and tries to capture him. He almost succeeds, but when the Raikage arrives to punish Bee for pretending to be captured, Kisame is apparently killed by the two brothers.
51	Sasuke vs. Danzo! Sasuke VS Danzō...!! (サスケVSダンゾウ...!!)	April 30, 2010; 978-4-08-870033-5	June 7, 2011; 978-1-4215-3498-5
474. "A Hokage's Decision...!!" (火影としての覚悟...!!, "Hokage to shite no kakugo...!!"); 475. "Madara's True Worth!!" (マダラの真骨頂!! "Madara no shinkocchō!!"); 476. "Sasuke vs. Danzo...!!" (サスケVSダンゾウ...!! "Sasuke VS Danzō...!!"); 477. "Do Not Speak of Itachi" (イタチを語るな "Itachi o kataruna"); 478. "Sasuke's Susano'o!!" (サスケの"須佐能乎"...!! "Sasuke no Susano'o...!!"); 479. "The Izanagi" (イザナギ "Izanagi"); 480. "Sacrifice" (犠牲 "Gisei"); 481. "The Death of Danzo!!" (ダンゾウ死す!! "Danzō shisu!!"); 482. "Just One More Time..." (もう一度... "Mō ichido..."); 483. "Master and Student Reunited!!" (再びの師弟!! "Futatabi no shitei!!")
When Danzo returns to Konohagakure, he is confronted by a recuperated Sasuke who tries to kill him. After holding his own, Danzo is outmatched. To survive, he takes Karin hostage, but Sasuke mortally wounds them both. Danzo initiates a suicide jutsu to take Sasuke and Madara with him, but they escape it. As Madara leaves, Sasuke tries to finish off Karin. He is stopped by Sakura, who failed to bring back Naruto and abandoned the rest of her group. Before they can kill each other, Kakashi arrives to kill Sasuke.
52	Cell Seven Reunion; Sorezore no Dainanahan!! (それぞれの第七班!!)	August 4, 2010; 978-4-08-870084-7	September 6, 2011; 978-1-4215-3957-7
484. "Cell Seven Reunion!!" (それぞれの第七班!!, "Sorezore no Dainanahan!!"); 485. "Near Yet Far" (近く...遠く... "Chikaku... Tōku..."); 486. "Fists" (拳 "Kobushi"); 487. "The Battle Begins...!!" (戦いの始まり...!! "Tatakai no hajimari...!!"); 488. "Every Shinobi Village" (それぞれの里へ "Sorezore no sato e"); 489. "Facing A Great Ninja War...!!" (忍界大戦へ向けて...!! "Ninkai taisen e mukete...!!"); 490. "The Truth About Nine-Tails!!" (九尾の真実!! "Kyūbi no shinjitsu!!"); 491. "The Jinchūriki, Detained!!" (人柱力監禁!! "Jinchūriki kankin!!"); 492. "Salutations" (あいさつ "Aisatsu"); 493. "Dark Naruto!!" (闇ナルト!! "Yami Naruto!!"); 494. "Killer Bee and Motoi" (キラービーとモトイ "Kirābī to Motoi")
After learning about Sakura and Sasuke's actions from Sai and Gaara, Naruto saves Sakura from being killed by Sasuke and calms the situation. Recognizing that words alone cannot change Sasuke, Naruto says that they will meet on the battlefield as Madara told him. Although Naruto says they will both die, Sasuke promises to be stronger than Naruto by then. They part, with Sasuke joining Madara and Naruto returning to Konoha with Sakura and Kakashi (taking Karin prisoner). The factions prepare for the future and Tsunade, awakening from her coma, reluctantly agrees with the other Kage to send Naruto and Bee into hiding on Bee's island to keep them safe from the Akatsuki. When they meet there, Naruto asks Bee to tame the Nine-Tails (since Bee has tamed his Eight-Tails), but Bee can do nothing until he overcomes the evil in his heart from a life of loneliness.
53	The Birth of Naruto; Naruto no shusshō (ナルトの出生)	November 4, 2010; 978-4-08-870126-4	December 6, 2011; 978-1-4215-4049-8
495. "Dark Naruto, Defeated!!" (闇ナルト撃破!!, "Yami Naruto gekiha!!"); 496. "Reunion with Nine Tails!!" (再会九尾!! "Saikai Kyūbi!!"); 497. "Nine Tails vs. Naruto!!" (九尾VSナルト!! "Kyūbi VS Naruto!!"); 498. "My Ma's Red Hair" (母さんの赤い髪 "Kā-san no akai kami"); 499. "A New Seal!!" (新たなる封印!! "Aratanaru fūin!!"); 500. "The Birth of Naruto" (ナルトの出生 "Naruto no shusshō"); 501. "Nine-Tails Attacks!!" (九尾襲来!! "Kyūbi shūrai!!"); 502. "The Fourth Lord's Death Match!!" (四代目の死闘!! "Yondaime no shitō!!"); 503. "Minato's Reaper Death Seal!!" (ミナトの屍鬼封尽!! "Minato no Shiki Fūjin!!"); 504. "Thank You" (ありがとう "Arigatō")
Naruto vanquishes the evil in his heart because the loneliness which created it is past. Killer Bee shows him how to tame the demon fox: by removing the seal keeping the fox within him and overpowering it. The fox's strength and cunning are too much for him, and he is almost defeated; however, the spirit of Kushina Uzumaki stops the fox, reveals herself as Naruto's real mother and gives him the resolve to contain the fox. Kushina tells Naruto how she and Minato fell in love and how the demon fox was originally sealed in her; Madara Uchiha used the fox to attack Konoha, and Kushina and Minato (believing that Naruto would defeat Madara) gave their lives to seal the fox's power in him. Kushina feels guilty about what Naruto has been through, but he does not blame her and allows her to pass on with no regrets.
54	Peace Viaduct; Heiwa e no kakehashi (平和への懸け橋)	December 29, 2010; 978-4-08-870143-1	January 3, 2012; 978-1-4215-4102-0
505. "Nine-Tails Chakra, Opened!!" (九尾チャクラ、開放!!, "Kyūbi chakura, kaihō!!"); 506. "Guy vs. Kisame!!" (ガイVS鬼鮫!! "Gai VS Kisame!!"); 507. "A False Existence...!!" (偽りの存在...!! "Itsuwari no sonzai...!!"); 508. "Shinobi Death Style" (忍の死に様 "Shinobi no shinizama"); 509. "Viaduct to Peace" (平和への懸け橋 "Heiwa e no kakehashi"); 510. "Forbidden Jutsu Shock!!" (まさかの禁術!! "Masaka no kinjutsu!!"); 511. "We Shall Return" (帰ってこよう "Kaettekoyō"); 512. "The Truth About Zetsu!!" (ゼツの真実!! "Zetsu no shinjitsu!!"); 513. "Kabuto vs. Tsuchikage!!" (カブトVS土影!! "Kabuto VS Tsuchikage!!"); 514. "Kabuto's Plan!!" (カブトの目論見!! "Kabuto no mokuromi!!")
Because he has conquered the demon fox, Naruto can detect Kisame (who faked his death and hid in his sword to spy on Bee). He tries to escape with what he has learned. For a third time, he battles Might Guy and is defeated. To keep Konoha from obtaining intelligence about the Akatsuki from him, Kisame commits suicide and sends the information he has gathered to Madara. Madara goes to Amegakure to retrieve Nagato's body, killing Konan when she tries to stop him. When he receives Kisame's information, Madara sends Kabuto Yakushi (who is allied with the Akatsuki) to capture Bee and Naruto. They are too well-defended, so Kabuto kidnaps Yamato.
55	The Great War Begins; Taisen, Kaisen! (大戦、開戦!)	April 21, 2011; 978-4-08-870185-1	March 6, 2012; 978-1-4215-4152-5
515. "The Great War Begins!" (大戦、開戦!, "Taisen, Kaisen!"); 516. "Gaara's Speech" (我愛羅の演説 "Gaara no enzetsu"); 517. "Omoi's War!!" (オモイの「戦争」!! "Omoi no 'sensō'!!"); 518. "Battle of the Commando Units!!" (奇襲部隊の攻防!! "Kishū butai no kōbō!!"); 519. "The Biju Bomb" (尾獣玉 "Bijūdama"); 520. "Secrets of the Edotensei" (穢土転生の秘密 "Edo Tensei no himitsu"); 521. "The Main Regiment in Battle!!" (大連隊、戦闘開始!! "Dairentai, sentō kaishi!!"); 522. "We Died." (死んだんだ "Shin danda"); 523. "The Legendary Seven Swordsmen of the Mist!!" (伝説の忍刀七人衆!! "Densetsu no Shinobigatana Shichininshū!!"); 524. "That Which Ought to be Protected" (守るべきもの "Mamorubekimono")
The Akatsuki and the Ninja Alliance Army complete their preparations and mobilize for war. After learning how to use Orochimaru's techniques, Kabuto revives several once-famous ninja to supplement the Akatsuki's army. A small ninja strike force defeats some of the ninja (including Sasori and Deidara), but is less successful with a second revived group which includes Zabuza Momochi and Haku. Kakashi and his portion of the ninja army defeat Zabuza and Haku before turning their attention to the rest of the group.
56	Team Asuma, Reunited; Saikai, Asuma han! (再会、アスマ班!)	June 3, 2011; 978-4-08-870218-6	May 8, 2012; 978-1-4215-4207-2
525. "The Kage Resurrected!!" (影、復活!!, "Kage, fukkatsu!!"); 526. "D Unit's Battle Challenge!!" (激戦! ダルイ部隊!! "Gekisen! Darui butai!!"); 527. "Forbidden Words" (NGワード "Enu Jī wādo"); 528. "Transcendent Drab" (「だるい」を超えて "'Darui' o koete"); 529. "Golden Bonds" (金色の絆 "Konjiki no kizuna"); 530. "Choji's Decision" (チョウジの決意 "Chōji no ketsui"); 531. "Team Asuma Reunited!" (再会、アスマ班! "Saikai, Asuma han!"); 532. "Mifune vs. Hanzo, Decided!!" (ミフネVS半蔵、決着!! "Mifune VS Hanzō, ketchaku!!"); 533. "A Time of Oaths" (誓いの時 "Chikai no toki"); 534. "Farewell, Ino-Shika-Cho!!" (さらば猪鹿蝶!! "Saraba Inoshikachō!!")
Darui, a soldier in the Ninja Alliance Army, engages the most notorious criminal duo in Kumogakure: the Gold and Silver Brothers Ginkaku and Kinkaku, who have been resurrected and deployed by the Akatsuki. A revived Asuma Sarutobi rejoins (and confronts) his former students Shikamaru Nara, Ino Yamanaka and Choji Akimichi. Mifune, the samurai general, fights his long-time ninja rival Hanzo of the Salamander. Since Ginkaku and Kinkaku possess the Nine-Tails' chakra, their attacks affect Naruto (who is unaware that the army is hiding him).
57	Battle; Naruto senjō e...!! (ナルト戦場へ...!!)	August 4, 2011; 978-4-08-870271-1	July 10, 2012; 978-1-4215-4306-2
535. "Iruka's Impact (イルカの説得, "Iruka no settoku"); 536. "Battle...!!" (ナルト戦場へ...!! "Naruto senjō e...!!"); 537. "Toward Nightfall...!!" (夜へ...!! "Yoru e...!!"); 538. "Cross-Examination" (詰問 "Kitsumon"); 539. "Blood Night...!!" (血の夜...!! "Chi no yoru...!!"); 540. "Madara's Scheme!!" (マダラの作戦!! "Madara no sakusen!!"); 541. "Raikage vs. Naruto!?" (雷影VSナルト!?); 542. "The Secret Origin of the Ultimate Tag Team!!" (最強タッグ秘話!! "Saikyō taggu hiwa!!"); 543. "Truer Words" (捨てられねェ言葉 "Suterarenē kotoba"); 544. "Two Suns!!" (二つの太陽!! "Futatsu no taiyō!!")
Learning about the war, Naruto and Killer Bee confront Iruka and escape from their hideout to support their comrades. Madara interrupts the war to steal the Gold and Silver Brothers' chakra; as night falls, both sides take a break to prepare for another encounter (each having lost half their forces). Naruto and Killer Bee are intercepted by the Raikage and Tsunade, who insist that hosts of Tailed Beasts should not participate. Tsunade decides to rely on Naruto's strength, and Bee and Naruto convince the Raikage to let them go when they use their abilities to defeat the Akatsuki.
58	Naruto vs. Itachi ナルトVSイタチ!!	November 4, 2011; 978-4-08-870302-2	September 11, 2012; 978-1-4215-4328-4
545. "The Immortal Corps" (不死身軍団!!, "Fujimi gundan!!"); 546. "Kage Showdown!!" (新旧影対決!! "Shinkyū Kage taiketsu!!"); 547. "Valued Trasures!!" (価値あるもの!! "Kachi aru mono!!"); 548. "Naruto vs. Itachi!!" (ナルトVSイタチ!!); 549. "Itachi's Question!!" (イタチの問い!! "Itachi no toi!!"); 550. "Koto'Amatsukami" (別天神); 551. "Stop Nagato!!" (長門を止めろ!! "Nagato o tomero!!"); 552. "To Be a Hokage...!!" (火影の条件...!! "Hokage no jōken...!!"); 553. "The Battlefield!!" (主戦場到着!! "Shusenjō tōchaku!!"); 554. "The Rasen-Shuriken Limit...!!" (螺旋手裏剣の限界...!! "Rasenshuriken no genkai...!!"); 555. "Paradox" (矛盾 "Mujun")
Naruto and Killer Bee deal with the army of Zetsus, beings created by Madara with the First Hokage's DNA and posing as allies. Gaara and the Tsuchikage Ōnoki's forces reach the four Kage who were revived by Kabuto. After Gaara defeats his father (the Fourth Kazekage), Naruto and Bee are confronted by Nagato and Itachi, who are under Kabuto's control. Itachi frees himself and helps the two hosts defeat Nagato. Itachi leaves to fight Kabuto alone, letting Naruto handle Sasuke. Naruto and Bee join the Ninja Alliance Army, with Naruto creating clones to fight the Second Tsuchikage, Mū and the Third Raikage.
59	The Five Kage; Gokage shūketsu...!! (五影集結...!!)	February 3, 2012; 978-4-08-870368-8	November 6, 2012; 978-1-4215-4942-2
556. "Gaara vs. Mizukage!! (ガアラVS水影!!); 557. "Steam Imp!!" (蒸危暴威!! "Jōki Bōi!!"); 558. "Kabuto's Trump Card...!!" (カブトの切り札...!! "Kabuto no kirifuda...!!"); 559. "Reinforcements...!!" (増援到着...!! "Zōen tōchaku...!!"); 560. "Uchiha Madara" (うちはマダラ); 561. "Power of a Name" (その名の力 "Sono na no chikara"); 562. "Reclamation" (己を拾う場所 "Onore o hirou basho"); 563. "The Five Kage...!!" (五影集結...!! "Gokage shūketsu...!!"); 564. "Nobody" (誰でもない男 "Dare demo nai otoko"); 565. "Jinchūriki vs. Jinchūriki!! (人柱力VS人柱力!!)
After Gaara defeats the Second Mizukage, the Ninja Alliance gains the advantage in the war; Naruto's clones identify the Zetsus. Kabuto uses the Second Tsuchikage to revive his strongest warrior: Madara Uchiha. This reveals that the Akatsuki leader, Tobi, has been using Madara's name to wield power. With Madara overwhelming Gaara and Ōnoki's forces, the other three Kage come to their aid. Naruto and Bee encounter Tobi, who tries to kidnap them. Using Nagato's Rinnegan, Tobi ambushes Naruto and Bee with the bodies of former hosts, who fight using the tailed beasts again sealed within them.
60	Kurama 九喇嘛!!	May 2, 2012; 978-4-08-870417-3	February 5, 2013; 978-1-4215-4943-9
566. "Eyes and Beasts" (眼と獣, "Me to kemono"); 567. "Jinchūriki of Konoha" (木ノ葉の里の人柱力 "Konoha no sato no Jinchūriki"); 568. "Four-Tails, the King of Sage Monkeys" (四尾・仙猿の王 "Yonbi: Sen'en no Ō"); 569. "Proof of Will!" (意志の証明!! "Ishi no shōmei!!"); 570. "Kurama!!" (九喇嘛!!); 571. "Biju Mode!!" (尾獣モード!! "Bijū Mōdo!!"); 572. "Nine Names" (九つの名前 "Kokonotsu no namae"); 573. "The Path to Light" (輝きへと続く道 "Kagayaki e to tsuzuku michi"); 574. "Eyes That See In The Dark" (闇を見る眼 "Yami o miru me"); 575. "A Will of Stone" (石の意志 "Ishi no ishi")
Kakashi Hatake and Might Guy join the fight but, despite their assistance, Naruto and Killer Bee cannot stop the tailed beasts controlled by Tobi. When Naruto is swallowed by Son Gokū the Four-Tails, he removes the piercing in his body which Tobi used to control it. The nine-tailed fox Kurama joins forces with Naruto for the first time, allowing him to stop the other five tailed-beasts. While reinforcements from the alliance assist Naruto, the five Kages continue their losing battle against Madara and Sasuke learns about the war.
61	Uchiha Brothers United Front; Kyōdai, kyōtō!! (兄弟、共闘!!)	July 27, 2012; 978-4-08-870477-7	May 7, 2013; 978-1-4215-5248-4
576. "Signposts" (再会の道標, "Saikai no michishirube"); 577. "Hate Blade" (憎しみの刃 "Nikushimi no yaiba"); 578. "The Weak Point of Despair" (絶望の弱点!! "Zetsubō no jakuten!!"); 579. "Uchiha Brothers United Front" (兄弟、共闘!! "Kyōdai, kyōtō!!"); 580. "Brother Time" (兄弟の時間 "Kyōdai no jikan"); 581. "To Each Their Own Konoha" (それぞれの木ノ葉 "Sorezore no Konoha"); 582. "Nothing" (何も無い "Nani mo nai"); 583. "Who Are You?" (これは誰だ "Kore wa dare da"); 584. "Yakushi Kabuto" (薬師カブト); 585. "I am Me" (ボクがボクであるために "Boku ga boku de aru tame ni"); 586. "The Izanami Activated" (イザナミ発動 "Izanami hatsudō"); 587. "Nine O'clock" (9時になったら "Kuji ni nattara")
Sasuke finds the revived Itachi, and follows him to Kabuto's hideout. As Itachi tries to trap Kabuto with illusions, forcing him to return his army to the afterlife, Sasuke agrees to help him if he reveals his feelings about the Uchiha massacre. During the fight Kabuto blocks his own vision, making the siblings' illusionary techniques useless against him. Sasuke and Itachi remain on the defensive until Itachi uses a forbidden technique which traps Kabuto's mind in a loop where the fight against the Uchiha never ends. With Kabuto unable to move, Itachi uses his Genjutsu to summon the undead ninja.
62	The Crack; Hibi (皹)	October 4, 2012; 978-4-08-870515-6	August 6, 2013; 978-1-4215-5619-2
588. "Burden of a Kage" (影を背負う, "Kage o seou"); 589. "Edotensei Jutsu, Release!" (穢土転生の術・解 "Edo Tensei no Jutsu: Kai"); 590. "I Will Love You Always" (お前をずっと愛している "Omae o zutto aishiteiru"); 591. "Risk" (リスク "Risuku"); 592. "A Third Force" (第三勢力 "Daisan seiryoku"); 593. "Orochimaru's Return" (復活の大蛇丸 "Fukkatsu no Orochimaru"); 594. "The Progenitor" (祖たるもの "Sotarumono"); 595. "The Crack" (皹 "Hibi"); 596. "One Single Jutsu" (一つの術 "Hitotsu no jutsu"); 597. "The Secret of Teleportation Ninjutsu (時空間忍術の秘密 "Jikūkan ninjutsu no himitsu")
Itachi summons all Kabuto's undead warriors except Madara, who remains on the battlefield by severing his ties with Kabuto's technique. Itachi returns to the afterlife after saying farewell to Sasuke, who begins to question his own motives. When Suigetsu and Jugo's scroll convince him to find answers, Sasuke revives Orochimaru. As Orochimaru takes back his chakra from Kabuto and guides Sasuke to those with the answers, Naruto, Kakashi, Guy and Bee continue fighting Tobi. With no choice, Tobi adds the discarded chakra traces of Kurama and Gyuki to the Demonic Statue of the Outer Path to begin the Ten-Tails' resurrection.
63	World of Dreams; Yume no sekai (夢の世界)	December 28, 2012; 978-4-08-870550-7	November 5, 2013; 978-1-4215-5885-1
598. "Demolition!!" (粉砕!!!!, "Funsai!!!!"); 599. "Uchiha Obito" (うちはオビト); 600. "Why Not Sooner?" (なぜ今まで "Naze ima made"); 601. "Obito and Madara" (オビトとマダラ "Obito to Madara"); 602. "Alive" (生きている "Ikiteiru"); 603. "Rehab" (リハビリ "Rihabiri"); 604. "Reunion, and then..." (再会、そして "Saikai, soshite"); 605. "Hell" (地獄 "Jigoku"); 606. "World of Dreams" (夢の世界 "Yume no sekai"); 607. "It Doesn't Matter to Me" (どうでもいいんだよ "Dōdemo iinda yo")
Naruto destroys Tobi's mask, revealing his identity as Obito Uchiha (one of Kakashi's teammates, believed to have died in the previous war). After defeating the five Kages, Madara comes to Obito's assistance. It is learned that several years earlier, an elderly Madara found Obito's severely-wounded body and saved his life. Obito sought rehabilitation to rejoin his team, and learned that Kakashi and Rin were in danger. When he found them, Obito saw Kakashi kill Rin while they were surrounded by enemies. Obito saved Kakashi and began sharing Madara's goal of an illusionary world so the "cycles of the world" could be broken. As Madara died, Obito adopted his name and manipulated Nagato to create the Akatsuki and capture the nine tailed-beasts required to reach his goal.
64	Ten Tails; Jūbi (十尾)	April 4, 2013; 978-4-08-870628-3	January 7, 2014; 978-1-4215-6139-4
608. "Kakashi's Resolve" (カカシの決意!!, "Kakashi no ketsui!!"); 609. "The End" (終わり "Owari"); 610. "Ten Tails" (十尾 "Jūbi"); 611. "The Arrival" (到着 "Tōchaku"); 612. "The Allied Shinobi Forces Jutsu!!" (忍連合軍の術!! "Shinobi Rengōgun no Jutsu!!"); 613. "The Brains" (頭 "Atama"); 614. "Because of You" (お前に "Omae ni"); 615. "The Ties That Bind" (繋がれるもの "Tsunagareru mono"); 616. "Those Who Dance in the Shadows" (忍び舞う者たち "Shinobimau mono-tachi"); 617. "Those Who Dance in the Shadows, Part 2" (忍び舞う者たち 其ノ弐 "Shinobimau mono-tachi - Sono ni")
The fight between Naruto's group and Obito and Madara is cut short by the resurrection of the incomplete ten-tailed beast. Obito and Madara train it to attack Naruto's group, overpowering them. Before their defeat, the Shinobi Alliance comes to Naruto's defense. Despite their efforts, the beast becomes more powerful. Several allies (including Neji) die protecting Naruto, who is in shock. Hinata Hyuga encourages him to continue fighting to protect their wills. Naruto shares Kurama's chakra with his comrades to create another combination which severs Obito and Madara's link to the Ten-Tails.
65	Hashirama and Madara; Hashirama to Madara (柱間とマダラ)	July 4, 2013; 978-4-08-870661-0	April 1, 2014; 978-1-4215-6455-5
618. "The All-Knowing" (全てを知る者たち, "Subete o shiru mono-tachi"); 619. "A Clan Possessed by Evil" (悪に憑かれた一族 "Aku ni tsukareta ichizoku"); 620. "Senju Hashirama" (千手柱間); 621. "Hashirama and Madara" (柱間とマダラ "Hashirama to Madara"); 622. "It Reached" (届いた "Todoita"); 623. "View" (一望 "Ichibō"); 624. "Even" (相子 "Aiko"); 625. "My True Dream" (本当の夢 "Hontō no yume"); 626. "Hashirama and Madara, Part 2" (柱間とマダラ 其ノ弐 "Hashirama to Madara - Sono ni"); 627. "Sasuke's Answer" (サスケの答え "Sasuke no kotae")
In Konoha, Orochimaru summons the shikigami to revive the four Hokages. Before he decides what to do with the Hokages, Sasuke asks them what they know of Konoha and the Uchiha's origins. The First Hokage, Hashirama Senju, tells Sasuke that during his childhood the Senju and Uchiha clans were at war and he met Madara in secret. Sharing the objective of a world without war, Hashirama and Madara became friends. However, they were found by their clans and became leaders (and enemies) in the war. After years of fighting, Madara accepted Hashirama's proposal to end the war and Konoha was created; however, the two clans' hatred resulted in Madara abandoning Konoha. Madara kept attacking the village until he was apparently killed by Hashirama. Realizing that Hashirama and Itachi shared the same dreams, Sasuke accompanies Orochimaru, Taka and the Hokages to the battlefield.
66	The New Three; Aratanaru sansukumi (新たなる三竦み)	September 4, 2013; 978-4-08-870801-0	July 1, 2014; 978-1-4215-6948-2
628. "Here and Now, and Hereafter" (ここに、そしてこれから, "Koko ni, Soshite kore kara"); 629. "Hole" (風穴 "Kazaana"); 630. "Something to Fill the Hole" (埋めるもの "Umeru mono"); 631. "Cell Number 7" (第七班 "Dainanahan"); 632. "A United Front" (共闘 "Kyōtō"); 633. "Onward" (前へ "Mae e"); 634. "The New Three" (新たなる三竦み "Aratanaru sansukumi"); 635. "A New Wind" (新しい風 "Atarashii kaze"); 636. "The Current Obito" (今のオビトを "Ima no Obito o"); 637. "The Ten Tails' Jinchuriki" (十尾の人柱力 "Jūbi no Jinchūriki")
As the battle between the Ninja Alliance and the Uchiha rages, Obito takes Kakashi to another dimension to keep him from attacking the Ten-Tails. During hand-to-hand combat in the Kamui dimension, the alliance tries to stop the tailed beast from leaving the area. They are joined by Sasuke, Jugo and the reanimated Hokages, who create a barrier around the area while Sasuke rejoins his former teammates from Konoha to stop the Ten-Tails. Kakashi mortally wounds Obito when he returns to the battlefield. Madara tries to revive Obito with his life; Obito resists, sealing the Ten-Tails within himself as its new host.
67	An Opening; Toppakō (突破口)	December 4, 2013; 978-4-08-870849-2	October 7, 2014; 978-1-4215-7384-7
638. "The Ten Tails' Jinchuriki, Obito" (十尾の人柱力・オビト, "Jūbi no Jinchūriki: Obito"); 639. "Assault" (襲 "Osou"); 640. "Finally" (やっとだよ "Yatto da yo"); 641. "You Two Are the Main Act!!" (君らがメインだ!! "Kimira ga Mein da!!"); 642. "An Opening" (突破口 "Toppakō"); 643. "Fist Bump" (合わせる拳...!! "Awaseru kobushi...!!"); 644. "I Know" (分かってる "Wakatteru"); 645. "Two Powers" (二つの力...!! "Futatsu no chikara...!!"); 646. "Divine Tree" (神樹 Shinju); 647. "Regret" (後悔 "Kōkai")
After becoming the Ten Tails' host, Obito attacks the Second, Third and Fourth Hokages and Madara faces the First. As the Hokages are overpowered, Naruto and Sasuke aid them but are powerless against the Ten-Tails' host. To restore his son's strength, Minato shares Kurama's other half Yin (sealed within him) so they can fight Obito together. Obito releases the true form of the Ten-Tails, the Divine Tree, which attacks the Ninja Alliance to seize their chakras and create the illusionary world. Unwilling to surrender, Naruto and Sasuke again confront Obito after he transfers his suffering to Ino.
68	Path; Wadachi (轍)	March 4, 2014; 978-4-08-880023-3	December 2, 2014; 978-1-4215-7682-4
648. "A Shinobi's Dream!!" (忍の夢...!!, "Shinobi no yume...!!"); 649. "A Shinobi's Will" (忍の意志 "Shinobi no ishi"); 650. "Those Who Shall Sleep" (眠るのは "Nemuru no wa"); 651. "That Which Fills the Hole" (埋めたもの "Umeta mono"); 652. "Naruto's Path" (ナルトの轍 "Naruto no wadachi"); 653. "I'm Always Watching" (ちゃんと見てる "Chanto miteru"); 654. "I'm Uchiha Obito" (うちはオビトだ "Uchiha Obito da"); 655. "Path" (轍 "Wadachi"); 656. "The Switch" (交代 "Kōtai"); 657. "Uchiha Madara Returns" (うちはマダラ、参る "Uchiha Madara, Mairu")
Naruto and Sasuke continue fighting against Obito, while the Alliance joins forces with the Hokages and Orochimaru to destroy the Divine Tree. Naruto and Sasuke overwhelm Obito, allowing Naruto to free the tailed beasts inside him. During the transfer, Naruto subconsciously convinces Obito to return to their side and become the man he once was. Kakashi tries to kill the defeated Obito, but is stopped by Minato. Naruto and Sasuke help Hashirama face Madara. To atone for his actions, Obito sacrifices his life to revive the people he killed; however, Black Zetsu forces him to revive Madara instead.
69	The Start of a Crimson Spring; Akaki haru no hajimari (紅き春の始まり)	May 2, 2014; 978-4-08-880054-7	March 3, 2015; 978-1-4215-7856-9
658. "Biju vs. Madara...!!" (尾獣VSマダラ...!!, Bijū bāsasu Madara...!!"); 659. "Limbo Hengoku" (輪墓・辺獄...!! "Rinbo: Hengoku...!!"); 660. "One's True Heart" (裏の心 "Ura no kokoro"); 661. "A Failed World" (失敗した世界 "Shippaishita sekai"); 662. "A True Ending" (本当の終わり "Hontō no owari"); 663. "No Matter What" (絶対に "Zettai ni"); 664. "I'm His Father" (父親だから "Chichioya dakara"); 665. "The Current Me" (今のオレは "Ima no ore wa"); 666. "The Two Mangekyo" (2つの万華鏡 "Futatsu no Mangekyō"); 667. "The End to Blue Days" (碧き日の終わり "Aoki hi no owari"); 668. "The Start of a Crimson Spring" (紅き春の始まり "Akaki haru no hajimari")
With the Rinnegan and his new life, Madara absorbs Hashirama's chakra and uses the sealing statue to reclaim all the tailed beasts (including Naruto's Yang Nine-Tailed Fox, nearly killing his host). Sasuke and the Second Hokage are defeated by Madara. Tobi, the spiral White Zetsu befriended by Obito during his time with Madara, appears and attacks the Ninja Alliance. Gaara grabs Naruto and brings him to Sakura, who performs CPR. Gaara then brings him to the Fourth Hokage to give him his Yin part of the Nine-Tailed Fox's chakra, but it is stolen by Black Zetsu. Madara confronts Minato's group to recover his Rinnegan from Obito. The reformed Obito allies with Kakashi, distracting Madara as Obito passes Naruto the tailed beasts' chakra. Guy decides to jeopardize his life fighting Madara opening the Eight Gate of Death.
70	Naruto and the Sage of Six Paths; Naruto to Rikudō Sennin...!! (ナルトと六道仙人...!!)	August 4, 2014; 978-4-08-880151-3	June 2, 2015; 978-1-4215-7975-7
669. "The Eight Inner Gates Formation!!" (八門遁甲の陣...!!, "Hachimon Tonkō no Jin...!!"); 670. "He of the Beginning...!!" (始まりのもの...!! "Hajimari no mono...!!"); 671. "Naruto and the Sage of Six Paths" (ナルトと六道仙人...!! "Naruto to Rikudō Sennin...!!"); 672. "Night Guy!!" (夜ガイ...!! "Yagai...!!"); 673. "WE Will...!!" (オレらで...!! "Orera de...!!"); 674. "Sasuke's Rinnegan" (サスケの輪廻眼...!! "Sasuke no Rinnegan...!!"); 675. "Your Current Dream" (今の夢 "Ima no yume"); 676. "The Infinite Dream" (無限の夢 "Mugen no yume"); 677. "The Infinite Tsukuyomi" (無限月読 "Mugen Tsukuyomi"); 678. "My Will Is..." (オレノ意志ハ "Ore no ishi wa"); 679. "She of the Beginning" (はじまりのもの "Hajimari no mono")
Guy battles Madara and keeps up with him by unlocking the Eighth Gate of Death. Naruto and Sasuke have a dream in which they talk with the Sage of the Six Paths, who identifies them as reincarnations of his two children Ashura and Indra. Since Madara is also a Indra's reincarnation and Hashirama is a Ashura's reincarnation, the Sage gives Naruto and Sasuke his chakra to stop him. When he awakens, Naruto saves Guy's life and begins battling Madara with Sasuke. They overwhelm Madara, forcing him to retreat to another dimension to steal Obito's Rinnegan. He uses the two Rinnegans to activate Infinite Tsukuyomi and place humanity under an illusion. Madara confronts Team 7 (who have avoided the illusion with Sasuke's Susanoo), but is stabbed in the back by Black Zetsu. Madara mutates into Kaguya Otsutsuki, the Sage's mother, who wants to transform humanity into White Zetsus.
71	I Love You Guys; Daisuki da (大好きだ)	November 4, 2014; 978-4-08-880208-4	August 4, 2015; 978-1-4215-8176-7
680. "Once More" (もう一度, "Mō ichido"); 681. "Kaguya's Tears" (カグヤの涙 "Kaguya no namida"); 682. "Bet Ya Never Seen This" (見たことねーだろ "Mita koto nē daro"); 683. "I Dreamt the Same Dream" (お前と同じ夢をみた "Omae to onaji yume o mita"); 684. "We Ought to Kill Him" (殺しておくべきだ "Koroshiteokubeki da"); 685. "All That I've Got!" (ありったけの...!! "Arittake no...!!"); 686. "Bequeath and Inherit" (残せし者と継ぎし者 "Nokoseshi mono to tsugishi mono"); 687. "You Better" (お前は必ず "Omae wa kanarazu"); 688. "He of the Sharingan!!" (写輪眼の...!! "Sharingan no...!!"); 689. "I Love You Guys" (大好きだ "Daisuki da"); 690. "Ninja History" (忍者の...!! "Ninja no...!!")
Kaguya faces Naruto and Sasuke (who plan to use their new powers to seal her in her native dimension), and transports Sasuke to another dimension to stop them. While Kaguya faces Naruto alone, Sakura and Obito search for Sasuke by using Sakura's chakra and Obito's eye technique. Although they bring Sasuke back to the battlefield, Obito sacrifices himself to protect Team 7 from an attack. Willing his dream of becoming Hokage to Naruto, Obito passes away and rejoins Rin in the afterlife. He transfers his energy to Kakashi so that he can use the both Mangekyo Sharingan once again. With Kakashi and Sakura's help, Naruto and Sasuke seal Kaguya.
72	Uzumaki Naruto うずまきナルト!!	February 4, 2015; 978-4-08-880220-6	October 6, 2015; 978-1-4215-8284-9
691. "Congratulations" (おめでとう, "Omedetō"); 692. "Revolution" (革命 "Kakumei"); 693. "Here Once Again" (ここでまた "Koko de mata"); 694. "Naruto and Sasuke, Part 1" (ナルトとサスケ① "Naruto to Sasuke (1)"); 695. "Naruto and Sasuke, Part 2" (ナルトとサスケ② "Naruto to Sasuke (2)"); 696. "Naruto and Sasuke, Part 3" (ナルトとサスケ③ "Naruto to Sasuke (3)"); 697. "Naruto and Sasuke, Part 4" (ナルトとサスケ④ "Naruto to Sasuke (4)"); 698. "Naruto and Sasuke, Part 5" (ナルトとサスケ⑤ "Naruto to Sasuke (5)"); 699. "Unison Sign" (和解の印 "Wakai no in"); 700. "Uzumaki Naruto!!" (うずまきナルト!!)
As Team 7 and the Tailed Beasts returns to their world, Obito and the reanimated Kage bid them farewell and depart for the afterlife as Madara dies of his injuries after renconcilling with Hashirama. Before he and Naruto can undo the illusion, Sasuke reveals his real intention to murder the Kage and Naruto (canceling the Infinite Tsukuyomi with the captured Tailed Beasts and killing them as well). Sasuke explains his intention to begin a worldwide revolution to reform the ninja system, which Naruto forbids. Sasuke knocks Sakura out to keep her from interfering, and he and Naruto agree to settle things at the Valley of the End (where their conflict began). The final battle ends with both ninja losing their dominant arms and Sasuke's redemption by Naruto. After Sakura saves them from bleeding to death, Naruto and Sasuke cancel the Infinite Tsukuyomi. Kakashi becomes the Sixth Hokage and pardons Sasuke, who decides to travel the world. Several years later, with a new arm and married to Hinata, Naruto, now the Seventh Hokage, attends the Five Kage Summit in Konoha after dealing with the antics of his son Boruto Uzumaki, who is hostiled with his father.
