= List of Blue Exorcist chapters =

The chapters of the Blue Exorcist manga series are written and illustrated by Kazue Kato. The story revolves around Rin Okumura, a teenager who discovers he is the son of Satan born from a human woman and is the inheritor of Satan's powers. When Satan kills his guardian, Rin decides to become an exorcist in order to defeat his father.

Blue Exorcist has been serialized by Shueisha in the monthly manga magazine Jump Square since April 2009. The first tankōbon volume was released on August 4, 2009; thirty-four volumes have been released as of May 1, 2026. The digital versions of the tankōbon in Japan are released in "Remastered" format, which include color on pages within each chapter that were originally printed in color in the monthly issues.

Outside Japan, the series is licensed in France by Kazé Manga, with the first volume released on May 27, 2010. The series was licensed by Viz Media for release in North America, who released the first volume on April 5, 2011; with overall thirty volumes released as of December 3, 2024.

== Volumes ==
No.	Original release date	Original ISBN	English release date	English ISBN
1	August 4, 2009	978-4-08-874709-5	April 5, 2011	978-1-421-54032-0
1. "The Mockery of Satan" (笑う青焔魔(サタン), Warau Satan); 2. "Big Brother, Little Brother" (兄と弟, Ani to Otōto); 3. "The Garden of Amahara" (天空(アマハラ)の庭, Amahara no Niwa)
After having an encounter with a demon, Rin Okumura learns that he is the son of Satan, the most powerful demon ever. Satan possesses the body of Rin's guardian, Father Shiro Fujimoto, and tries to drag him to the demon realm, Gehenna, but Fujimoto sacrifices himself to protect Rin, who is forced to unlock his demonic powers to escape. On Shiro's funeral, Rin asks the True Cross Academy's chairman Mephisto Pheles to let him enroll there to become an Exorcist and confront Satan himself, but much to his surprise, he learns that his twin brother Yukio is already a full-fledged exorcist and will be his teacher. Among Rin's new classmates is Shiemi Moriyama, the daughter of the Exorcism-related shop owner who was being afflicted by a demon until she was saved by him and his brother.
2	November 4, 2009	978-4-08-874757-6	June 7, 2011	978-1-421-54033-7
4. "Child of a Cursed Temple" (祟り寺の仔, Tataridera no Ko); 5. "Flock of Plovers" (友千鳥, Tomochidori); 6. "One Suffers Here" (此に病める者あり, Koko ni Yameru Mono Ari); 7. "Memory" (おもひで, Omoide); 4-koma Special
Rin becomes acquainted with his new classmates and together they take part in the Exwire exam to get one step closer to become exorcists, but while waiting for the exam to begin, they are attacked by powerful monsters, and Rin must find a way to fight back without revealing his demonic nature to the others, unaware that one of the teachers is also after his life.
3	March 4, 2010	978-4-08-870016-8	August 2, 2011	978-1-42-154034-4
8. "Black Cat" (黒猫, Kuroneko); 9. "Tag" (鬼事, Onigokko); 10. "Proof" (証明, Shōmei); 11. "Fun Camp" (愉しいキャンプ, Tanoshii Kyanpu); 4-koma Special
One of Fujimoto's familiars causes a commotion after learning of his death and Rin, now an Esquire, manages to calm it down and becomes its new owner. But the True Cross Headquarters sends Shura Kirigakure, a former student of Fujimoto's, to investigate about Rin and dispose of him after confirming his connection with Satan. Seeing Rin's determination to become a Paladin, the highest-ranked exorcist just like his guardian once was, Shura decides to spare his life and aid with his training instead.
4	July 2, 2010	978-4-08-870079-3	October 4, 2011	978-1-42-154047-4
12. "Light Trap" (誘蛾灯, Yūgatō); 13. "Something Kind" (やさしい事, Yasashii Koto); 14. "The Wager" (賭, Kake); 15. "Every Last One" (どいつもこいつも, Doitsu mo Koitsu mo); 4-koma Special
While taking part in a special training camp, Rin and his classmates are attacked by the demon Amaimon and he is forced to reveal his secret to protect them. Then he is captured by Arthur Auguste Angel, True Cross' current Paladin, and brought to the upper echelons at the Vatican to have them decide his fate. Mephisto intervenes on Rin's favor, claiming that having him live and become an exorcist could help them to get the upper hand against the demons and the Order declares that he has six months to pass the exorcist exam, thus Rin starts his special training with Yukio and Shura.
5	December 3, 2010	978-4-08-870136-3	December 6, 2011	978-1-42-154076-4
16. "When It All Began" (事の始まり, Koto no Hajimari); 17. "Let's Go to Kyoto!" (京都へGo(ゴー)!, Kyōto e Gō!); 18. "Discord" (仲違い, Nakatagai); 19. "Drunken Son" (酔いどれ息子, Yoidore Musuko); 4-koma Special
Rin and Yukio fail to prevent a powerful demonic relic, the "Left Eye of the Impure King" from being stolen by Saburota Todo, an exorcist who was turned into a demon, thus they set with the other Esquires to Kyoto, hometown to his classmates Ryuji Suguro, Renzo Shima and Konekomaru Miwa to help the exorcists of the "Myoda Sect" who are keeping guard on its counterpart, the "Right Eye of the Impure King". To complicate matters, Rin must deal with the estrangement from his peers who are avoiding him since they learned that he is the son of Satan.
6	April 4, 2011	978-4-08-870214-8	February 7, 2012	978-1-42-154174-7
20. "Traitor" (裏切者, Uragirimono); 21. "Calamity" (転変, Tenpen); 22. "Flare-up" (炎火, Enka); 23. "The Father's Story" (父語り, Chichi-gatari); Bonus Chapter 1 "Phantom Train" (幽靈列車(ファントム トレイン), Fantomu Torein); Bonus Chapter 2 "Kuro Runs Away" (クロの家出, Kuro no Iede)
The "Right Eye of the Impure King" is stolen by Mamushi, one of the Myoda students who claim that the True Cross Order can not be trusted for sheltering the son of Satan. High priest Tatsuma, the leader of the Myoda, rushes to follow her but not before being confronted by Suguro, who also happens to be his son. To worsen matters, Rin confronts Suguro for being rough on his father and unwillingly reveals his secret to the other members of the Myoda who end up having him imprisoned. Before leaving, Tatsuma leaves a letter to Rin explaining about his connection with Fujimoto and the sword "Komaken" that is currently on Rin's possession.
7	September 2, 2011	978-4-08-870330-5	April 3, 2012	978-1-42-154262-1
24. "Empty Sword" (空虚の剣, Kara no Ken); 25. "Impure King" (不浄王, Fujō-Ō); 26. "Fire of the Heart" (こころのひ, Kokoro no Hi); 27. "Battle at Kongo-Shinzan" (決戦!金剛深山, Kessen! Kongō-shinzan)
Mamushi finds that she was deceived by Todo and unwillingly helped him to awaken the Impure King. She rushes back to the Myoda asking them to help Tatsuma and Rin decides to go to his aid. However, for some reason he becomes unable to draw his blade and he is locked in a special prison awaiting execution by the Vatican's orders. Rin's classmates learn about his situation and manage to break him free, and once again reunited, the Esquires join the Myoda to confront the Impure King, whose poisonous miasma threatens to ravage the city of Kyoto.
8	April 4, 2012	978-4-08-870409-8	November 6, 2012	978-1-4215-5084-8
28. "Crimson Lotus" (紅蓮, Guren); 29. "Barrier Spell" (結界呪, Kekkai-shu); 30. "Fateful Occurrence" (因縁生起, Innen Shōki); 31. "Death" (入滅, Nyūmetsu); 32. "Abyss" (深淵, Shin'en)
While the other exorcists struggle to contain the miasma, Rin, Suguro and Kuro dive into the core of the Impure King to purify it. Yukio faces and defeats a stronger Todo who became immortal after consuming the energy of a phoenix with the help of the other Myoda priests. When Suguro's powers reach their limit, he asks Rin to run away while he still can, but he refuses to, and finally manages to draw Komaken again, awakening a spirit who infuses itself into the sword to help him control his flames against the Impure King. Meanwhile, Mephisto watches it all by the sidelines, acting as a mere spectator as the battle unfolds.
9	September 4, 2012	978-4-08-870505-7	April 2, 2013	978-1-4215-5477-8
33. "Obliterate" (砕破, Saiha); 34. "Wrapping Things Up" (事の結び, Koto no Musubi); 35. "The Sea is Vast and Wide" (海は広いな大きいし, Umi wa Hiroi na Ōkiishi); 36. "Gone with the Blue Waves" (青い波ゆれてどこまで, Aoi Nami Yurete Dokomade); 37. "The Moon Falls and the Sun Rises" (月は沈むし日も昇る, Tsuki wa Shizumu shi Hi mo Noboru)
With his flames under control, Rin manages to protect his friends from the miasma and defeat the Impure King. Before returning to the academy, the Esquires take part in a mission to hunt down a Kraken that is terrorizing the coastline. While fighting the monster, Rin, Yukio and Shiemi get themselves stranded on a small island where they encounter an ancient whale-deity who helps them to defeat it.
10	December 28, 2012	978-4-08-870670-2	July 2, 2013	978-1-42-155886-8
38. "Exorcist" (エクソシスト, Ekusoshisuto); 39. "Demon Manners" (悪魔の作法(マナー), Akuma no Manā); 40. "The Seven Mysteries of True Cross Academy" (正十字学園七不思議, Seijūji Gakuen Nanafushigi); 41. "Where Secrets Are" (秘密の在り処, Himitsu no Arika); Bonus Chapter "Kinzo's Band Doesn't Care" (金兄のバンドは売れる気0(ゼロ)です, Kin-nii no Bando wa Ureru Ki Zero desu)
Back at the academy, Rin learns that Godaiin, one of his classmates started to see demons against his will and strikes a deal with Mephisto. The chairman agrees to provide Rin with some special eyedrops for Godaiin to return to normal in exchange for him and the other Esquires to deal with some mischievous apparitions known as "The Seven Mysteries of True Cross Academy". Meanwhile the Order finds a gate to Gehenna opening in Russia and Mephisto uses his powers to stop time around it, which according to him will only give them some months to find a way to close it.
11	August 2, 2013	978-4-08-870789-1	March 4, 2014	978-1421565477
42. "The World's Astir" (ざわめく世界, Zawameku Sekai); 43. "Friends" (友達, Tomodachi); 44. "Mephisto's Ramblings" (メフィストの戯言, Mefisuto no Tawagoto); 45. "The Walking Dead of the Youth" (青春の生ける屍(ウォーキングデッド), Seishun no Wōkingu Deddo); 46. "Trial and Error" (トライアンドエラー, Torai ando Erā); 47. "True Cross Academy Festival Eve" (正十字学園祭—前夜, Seijūji Gakuen-Sai Zen'ya)
Helped by his friends, Rin manages to keep his part in the bargain and obtain the eyedrops for Godaiin. As rumors of a spy among the members of the True Cross Order put all members in alert, a Festival is held in the Academy and Izumo agrees to help Rin with his food shop, but Takara Nemu, an Esquire who always kept a distance from the others, approaches her with unknown intentions.
12	December 27, 2013	978-4-08-870895-9	November 4, 2014	978-1-42-157536-0
48. "The Night of the True Cross Academy Festival" (正十字学園祭—当夜, Seijūji Gakuen-Sai: Tōya); 49. "True Cross Academy Festival—The Final Night" (正十字学園祭—後夜, Seijūji Gakuen-Sai: Kōya); 50. "The Most Important Thing to Me" (私の一番大切なもの, Watashi no Ichiban Taisetsu-na Mono); 51. "A Fool Is the One Who Is Tricked" (騙される方がバカだって..., Damasareru Hō ga Baka datte...); 52. "I Can't Rely on Anyone" (もう誰も頼れない, Mō Dare mo Tayorenai)
Izumo is kidnapped by Renzo, who is revealed to be a spy for the Illuminati organization led by Lucifer, another son of Satan. Nemu is revealed to be a spy as well but working under Mephisto, who sends Yukio, Rin and the other Esquires to look for Izumo at her homeland where they meet a fox spirit who reveals the tragic past of Izumo and her family. Meanwhile, Izumo is taken to the Illuminati headquarters where she is reunited with her mother whose body is badly damaged from being possessed by a nine tailed fox for years, and is forced to become the next vessel for it.
13	July 4, 2014	978-4-08-880140-7	June 2, 2015	978-1-42-157974-0
53. "This Is the Real Me" (これが本当のあたし, Kore ga Hontō no Atashi); 54. "I'm Not Going Back to the Order" (騎士團には戻らない, Kishi-dan ni wa Modoranai); 55. "Like Siblings" (兄弟みたいな, Kyōdai Mitai na); 56. "Intermedio" (幕間劇, Makuaigeki); 57. "Opening Rounds" (序盤戦, Joban-sen)
Rin and his friends infiltrate the Illuminatti headquarters just to fall into a trap where they are separated and forced to confront the abominations created by the enemy's experiments. Meanwhile, preparations are being made for Izumo to become the vessel for the nine tailed fox, despite there is a high chance that the procedure fails, claiming her life in the process.
14	January 5, 2015	978-4-08-880282-4	January 5, 2016	978-1-42-158263-4
58. "Middle Game" (中盤戦, Chūban-sen); 59. "Endgame" (終盤戦, Shūban-sen); 60. "Just Being Around Them Irritates Me" (一緒にいるだけで, Issho ni Iru Dake de); 61. "Treasure" (宝物, Takaramono); 62. "Quell This Evil Spirit" (悪祓ひ去らしめ給はむ, Akuhara hi Sara Shime Tamahamu)
The Esquires reunite and reach Izumo just as she is about to be possessed by the nine tailed fox, but her mother makes it return to her body instead in order to save her daughter. The lead researcher, Gedouin, transforms himself into a demon and attacks the Esquires in revenge for ruining his plans, just to be exorcised by Izumo.
15	June 4, 2015	978-4-08-880369-2	May 3, 2016	978-1-42-158507-9
63. "Goodbye" (さよなら, Sayonara); 64. "I'll Come Again" (行ってきます, Ittekimasu); 64.5. "Welcome Home" (おかえり, Okaeri): 65. "Pink Spider: Part 1" (ピンクスパイダー 前編, Pinku Supaidā Zenpen); 66. "Pink Spider: Part 2" (ピンクスパイダー 中編, Pinku Supaidā Chūhen); 67. "Pink Spider: Part 3" (ピンクスパイダー 後編, Pinku Supaidā Kōhen)
After returning safely, Izumo discovers that her little sister was in custody of the True Cross Order all this time and was given to an adoptive family, but much to her sadness, she does not remember her anymore. Renzo, who is revealed to be a double spy hired by Mephisto, returns to the Academy and rejoins the others. In the occasion, he inquires Yukio about his previous encounter with Lucifer, and if he still refuses to join his side, with the promise of having his latent powers unlocked.
16	January 4, 2016	978-4-08-880507-8	December 6, 2016	978-1-42-159041-7
68. "Naked Festival" (はだかまつり, Hadaka Matsuri); 69. "A High-Level Conference" (上層部圓卓会議, Jōsōbu Entaku Kaigi); 70. "Ambition" (野望, Yabō); 71. "Love Is in the Eye of the Beholder" (惚れたが因果, Horeta ga Inga); 72. "On The Way" (道すがら, Michisugara); 73. "Love Awakens" (戀い初める, Koi Someru)
17	July 4, 2016	978-4-08-880656-3	July 4, 2017	978-1-42-159333-3
74. "Hachinohe Station in the Snow" (八戸駅は雪の中, Hachinohe Eki wa Yuki no Naka); 75. "Hearing Only the Blizzard" (吹雪く音だけをきいている, Fubuku Oto Dake o Kiite Iru); 76. "Distant Northern Goodbye" (北のはずれでさようなら, Kita no Hazure de Sayōnara); 77. "It's All Right if I Don't Go Back" (戻れなくてももういいの, Modorenakutemo Mō Iino); 78. "As If Begging For Tears" (泣けとばかりに, Nake to Bakari ni)
18	December 31, 2016	978-4-08-880891-8	January 2, 2018	978-1-42-159654-9
79. "The Unfreezing Serpent" (凍えそうな蛇, Kogoesōna Kuchinawa); 80. "Aomori Winter Scenery" (ああ青森冬景色, Ā Aomori Fuyu Geshiki); 81. "Underground Library" (地下図書館, Chika Toshokan); 82. "Awakening" (啓蟄, Keichitsu); 83. "Sprout" (萌芽, Hōga)
19	April 4, 2017	978-4-08-881052-2	June 5, 2018	978-1-42-159804-8
84. "Foundation" (根幹, Konkan); 85. "Variant Leaves" (異形葉, Ikeiyō); 86. "Fruit Branches" (結果枝, Kekkashi); 87. "Embryo" (胚子, Hai); 88. "Happy (Merry Xmas) Birthday Eve!" (ハッピー（メリクリ）バースデー！イヴ, Happī (Merikuri) Bāsudē! Ivu)
20	October 4, 2017	978-4-08-881152-9	October 2, 2018	978-1-97-470102-5
89. "Happy (Merry Xmas) Birthday!" (ハッピー（メリクリ）バースデー！, Happī (Merikuri) Bāsudē!); 90. "Congratulations – Bridal Night" (寿・初夜, Kotobuki Soya); 91. "Congratulations – Late Night" (寿・後夜, Kotobuki Goya); 92. "Beyond the Snow: Part 1" (雪の果て 1, Yuki no Hate 1); 93. "Beyond the Snow: Part 2" (雪の果て 2, Yuki no Hate 2)
21	March 2, 2018	978-4-08-881363-9	January 1, 2019	978-1-97-470393-7
94. "Beyond the Snow: Part 3" (雪の果て 3, Yuki no Hate 3); 95. "Beyond the Snow: Part 4" (雪の果て 4, Yuki no Hate 4); 96. "Beyond the Snow: Part 5" (雪の果て 5, Yuki no Hate 5); 97. "Beyond the Snow: Part 6" (雪の果て 6, Yuki no Hate 6); 98. "Beyond the Snow: Part 7" (雪の果て 7, Yuki no Hate 7)
22	November 2, 2018	978-4-08-881591-6	September 3, 2019	978-1-9747-0873-4
99. "Beyond the Snow: Part 8-A" (雪の果て 8-a, Yuki no Hate 8-a); 99.5. "Beyond the Snow: Part 8-B" (雪の果て 8-b, Yuki no Hate 8-b): 100. "SsC00:40"; 101. "SsC04:36"; 102. "SsC05:35"; 103. "SsC11:29"
23	April 4, 2019	978-4-08-881809-2	February 4, 2020	978-1-9747-1172-7
104. "SsC20:20"; 105. "SsC19:21"; 106. "SsC23:17"; 107. "SsC23:17b"; 108. "SsC23:17c"
24	November 1, 2019	978-4-08-882110-8	August 4, 2020	978-1-9747-1052-2
109. "SsC23:17d"; 110. "SsC40:00a"; 111. "SsC40:00b"; 112. "SsC40:00c"; 113. "SsC40:00d"; 114. "SsC23:17e"
25	June 4, 2020	978-4-08-882299-0	February 2, 2021	978-1-9747-1846-7
115. "SsC23:17f"; 116. "SsC23:17g"; 117. "SsC23:17h"; 118. "SsC23:17i"; 119. "SsC24:16"; 120. "SsC40:00e"
26	December 4, 2020	978-4-08-882574-8	October 5, 2021	978-1-9747-2462-8
121. "Of One Cloth – Preface" (無双 序ず, Musō Tsuizu); 122. "Of One Cloth – Starting a Fire" (無双 熾す, Musō Okosu); 123. "Of One Cloth – All-Out War" (無双 豪ぐ, Musō Eragu); 124. "Of One Cloth – In Flames" (無双 爛る, Musō Tadaru); 125. "Of One Cloth – Disrupt" (無双 乱す, Musō Midasu)
27	July 2, 2021	978-4-08-882644-8	May 3, 2022	978-1-9747-3107-7
126. "Of One Cloth – Sundered" (無双 破る, Musō Yaburu); 127. "Of One Cloth – Thaw" (無双 爍す, Musō Tokasu); 128. "Of One Cloth – Shine" (無双 燿る, Musō Hikaru); 129. "Of One Cloth – Felicitations" (無双 寿ぐ, Musō Kotohogu); 130. "Of One Cloth – Shine" (無双 赫く, Musō Kagayaku)
28	November 4, 2022	978-4-08-883264-7	November 14, 2023	978-1-9747-4073-4
131. "Of One Cloth – Clarification" (無双 闡す, Musō Arawasu); 132. "Of One Cloth – Eruption" (無双 爆ぜる, Musō Hazeru); 133. "Of One Cloth – Flutter" (無双 舞う, Musō Mau); 134. "Of One Cloth – Awakening" (無双 醒める, Musō Sameru); 135. "Of One Cloth – Waking Up" (無双 覚す, Musō Satosu)
29	July 4, 2023	978-4-08-883460-3	August 6, 2024	978-1-9747-4624-8
136. "Of One Cloth – Cutting In" (無双 斷つ, Musō Tatsu); 137. "Of One Cloth – Affliction" (無双 禍, Musō Maga); 138. "Of One Cloth – Destruction" (無双 破局, Musō Hakyoku); 139. "Of One Cloth – From Now On, Part 1" (無双 是れから 前編, Musō Kore Kara Zenpen); 140. "Of One Cloth – From Now On, Part 2" (無双 是れから 後編, Musō Kore Kara Kōhen); Bonus Chapter "Taking Care of Kuro" (クロのお世話, Kuro no Osewa)
30	January 4, 2024	978-4-08-883722-2	December 3, 2024	978-1-9747-4982-9
141. "Of One Cloth – Representation" (無双 現す, Musō Arawasu); 142. "Of One Cloth – Gather and Fight" (無双 鬪まる, Musō Atsumaru); 143. "Of One Cloth – Signs" (無双 兆す, Musō Kizasu); 144. "Of One Cloth – Signs 2" (無双 兆す 二, Musō Kizasu ni); 145. "Of One Cloth – Confrontation" (無双 臨む, Musō Nozomu)
31	June 4, 2024	978-4-08-884028-4	July 1, 2025	978-1-9747-5538-7
146. "Of One Cloth – Having An Audience" (無双 覲ゆ, Musō Mamiyu); 147. "Of One Cloth – Burning" (無双 熱る, Musō Ikiru); 148. "Of One Cloth – Combat Ability" (無双 才む, Musō Sadamu); 149. "Of One Cloth – Endure" (無双 續く, Musō Tsudzuku); 150. "Of One Cloth – Sudden Death" (無双 焉, Musō Izuku)
32	May 2, 2025	978-4-08-884519-7	April 7, 2026	978-1-9747-6242-2
151. "Of One Cloth – Death" (無双 亡する, Musō na Shisuru); 152. "Of One Cloth – Everywhere" (無双 普く, Musō Amaneku); 153. "Of One Cloth – Fear" (無双 忌れる, Musō Osoreru); 154. "Of One Cloth – Gouge" (無双 闕つ, Musō Ugatsu); 155. "Of One Cloth – Changes" (無双 變わる, Musō Kawaru); 156. "Of One Cloth – Fall" (無双 堕ちる, Musō Ochiru)
33	December 4, 2025	978-4-08-884708-5	December 1, 2026	978-1-9747-6908-7
157. "Of One Cloth – Venting (無双 嚇る, Musō Ikaru); 158. "Of One Cloth – Human" (無双 人, Musō Hito); 159. "Of One Cloth – Encounters" (無双 邂逅, Musō Wakuraba); 160. "Of One Cloth – Tangled" (無双 縺る, Musō Motsuru); 161. "Of One Cloth – Upside-down" (無双 逆様, Musō Sakasama)
34	May 1, 2026	978-4-08-885005-4	—	—
162. "Of One Cloth – Trickery" (無双 如何様, Musō Ikasama); 163. "Of One Cloth – To the Heart's Content" (無双 恖様, Musō Omōsama); 164. "Of One Cloth – Confusion" (無双 惑う, Musō Madō); 165. "Of One Cloth – Going Ahead" (無双 先んず, Musō Sakinzu); 166. "Of One Cloth – To the Extreme" (無双 極まる, Musō Kiwamaru)

== See also ==
- List of Blue Exorcist episodes
- List of Blue Exorcist characters
