= List of Oricon number-one manga of 2012 =

A chart with the best selling manga in Japan is published weekly by Oricon. This list includes the manga that reached the number one place on that chart in 2012.

== Chart history ==
Week	Date	Title	Author	Publisher	Copies	Reference
1	January 2–8	Bakuman, vol.16	Tsugumi Ohba, Takeshi Obata	Shueisha	343,178	
2	January 9–15	Bakuman, vol.16	Tsugumi Ohba, Takeshi Obata	Shueisha	93,261	
3	January 16–22	Gantz, vol.33	Hiroya Oku	Shueisha	155,485	
4	January 23–29	Kimi ni Todoke, vol.15	Karuho Shiina	Shueisha	640,780	
5	January 30–February 5	One Piece, vol.65	Eiichiro Oda	Shueisha	1,934,961	
6	February 6–12	One Piece, vol.65	Eiichiro Oda	Shueisha	617,760	
7	February 13–19	One Piece, vol.65	Eiichiro Oda	Shueisha	176,950	
8	February 20–26	Fairy Tail, vol.31	Hiro Mashima	Kodansha	141,042	
9	February 27–March 4	Bleach, vol.54	Tite Kubo	Shueisha	269,751	
10	March 5–11	Bleach, vol.54	Tite Kubo	Shueisha	204,333	
11	March 12–18	Chihayafuru, vol.16	Yuki Suetsugu	Kodansha	212,169	
12	March 19–25	March Comes in Like a Lion, vol.7	Chica Umino	Hakusensha	356,250	
13	March 26–April 1	We Were There, vol.16	Yuki Obata	Shogakukan	370,166	
14	April 2–8	Hunter × Hunter, vol.30	Yoshihiro Togashi	Shueisha	638,907	
15	April 9–15	Attack on Titan, vol.7	Hajime Isayama	Kodansha	382,299	
16	April 16–22	Fairy Tail, vol.32	Hiro Mashima	Kodansha	297,314	
17	April 23–29	Giant Killing, vol.23	Masaya Tsunamoto, Tsujitomo	Kodansha	200,112	
18	April 30–May 6	One Piece, vol.66	Eiichiro Oda	Shueisha	2,275,453	
19	May 7–13	Kimi ni Todoke, vol.16	Karuho Shiina	Shueisha	473,164	
20	May 14–20	Kimi ni Todoke, vol.16	Karuho Shiina	Shueisha	315,709	
21	May 21–27	Black Butler, vol.14	Yana Toboso	Square Enix	165,404	
22	May 28–June 3	Black Butler, vol.14	Yana Toboso	Square Enix	248,114	
23	June 4–10	Bleach, vol.55	Tite Kubo	Shueisha	521,626	
24	June 11–17	Chihayafuru, vol.16	Yuki Suetsugu	Kodansha	222,909	
25	June 18–24	Detective Conan, vol.76	Gosho Aoyama	Shogakukan	290,361	
26	June 25–July 1	Saki, vol.10	Ritz Kobayashi	Square Enix	191,634	
27	July 2–8	Bakuman, vol.20	Tsugumi Ohba, Takeshi Obata	Shueisha	331,355	
28	July 9–15	Natsume's Book of Friends, vol.14	Yuki Midorikawa	Hakusensha	113,023	
29	July 16–22	Silver Spoon, vol.4	Hiromu Arakawa	Shogakukan	397,416	
30	July 23–29	Naruto, vol.61	Masashi Kishimoto	Shueisha	706,697	
31	July 30–August 5	One Piece, vol.67	Eiichiro Oda	Shueisha	1,754,309	
32	August 6–12	One Piece, vol.67	Eiichiro Oda	Shueisha	638,421	
33	August 13–19	One Piece, vol.67	Eiichiro Oda	Shueisha	251,837	
34	August 20–26	Fairy Tail, vol.34	Hiro Mashima	Kodansha	168,715	
35	August 27–September 2	Ao Haru Ride, vol.5	Io Sakisaka	Shueisha	143,429	
36	September 3–9	Blue Exorcist, vol.9	Kazue Katō	Shueisha	486,195	
37	September 10–16	Chihayafuru, vol.18	Yuki Suetsugu	Kodansha	196,339	
38	September 17–23	Detective Conan, vol.77	Gosho Aoyama	Shogakukan	314,809	
39	September 24–30	Kimi ni Todoke, vol.17	Karuho Shiina	Shueisha	683,751	
40	October 1–7	Naruto, vol.62	Masashi Kishimoto	Shueisha	660,402	
41	October 8–14	Naruto, vol.62	Masashi Kishimoto	Shueisha	206,959	
42	October 15–21	Silver Spoon, vol.5	Hiromu Arakawa	Shogakukan	342,925	
43	October 22–28	Vagabond, vol.34	Takehiko Inoue	Kodansha	312,311	
44	October 29–November 4	One Piece, vol.68	Eiichiro Oda	Shueisha	1,555,724	
45	November 5–11	One Piece, vol.68	Eiichiro Oda	Shueisha	632,835	
46	November 12–18	One Piece, vol.68	Eiichiro Oda	Shueisha	202,066	
47	November 19–25	Real, vol.12	Takehiko Inoue	Shueisha	270,793	
48	November 26–December 2	Real, vol.12	Takehiko Inoue	Shueisha	122,236	
49	December 3–9	Hunter × Hunter, vol.31	Yoshihiro Togashi	Shueisha	684,299	
50	December 10–16	March Comes in Like a Lion, vol.8	Chica Umino	Hakusensha	223,556	
51	December 17–23	Detective Conan, vol.78	Gosho Aoyama	Shogakukan	352,174	
52	December 24–30	Hunter × Hunter, vol.32	Yoshihiro Togashi	Shueisha	619,064	
53	December 31–January 6	Naruto, vol.63	Masashi Kishimoto	Shueisha	287,331	
