= List of Oricon number-one manga of 2014 =

A chart with the best selling manga in Japan is published weekly by Oricon. This list includes the manga that reached the number one place on that chart in 2014.

== Chart history ==
Week	Date	Title	Author	Publisher	Copies	Reference
1	January 6–12	Silver Spoon, 10	Hiromu Arakawa	Shogakukan	460,147	
2	January 13–19	Magi: The Labyrinth of Magic, 20	Shinobu Ohtaka	Shogakukan	269,671	
3	January 20–26	Black Butler, 18	Yana Toboso	Square Enix	263,204	
4	January 27–February 2	Giant Killing, 30	Masaya Tsunamoto and Tsujitomo	Kodansha	72,592	
5	February 3–9	Gin Tama, 53	Hideaki Sorachi	Shueisha	203,161	
6	February 10–16	Say "I love you.", 12	Kanae Hazuki	Kodansha	116,362	
7	February 17–23	Terra Formars, 8	Yū Sasuga and Kenichi Tachibana	Shueisha	299,947	
8	February 24–March 2	Ore Monogatari!!, 5	Aruko and Kazune Kawahara	Shueisha	196,102	
9	March 3–9	One Piece, 73	Eiichiro Oda	Shueisha	2,075,407	
10	March 10–16	One Piece, 73	Eiichiro Oda	Shueisha	348,844	
11	March 17–23	Fairy Tail, 42	Hiro Mashima	Kodansha	310,059	
12	March 24–30	Kimi ni Todoke, 21	Karuho Shiina	Shueisha	555,076	
13	March 31–April 6	Kimi ni Todoke, 21	Karuho Shiina	Shueisha	166,060	
14	April 7–13	Attack on Titan, 13	Hajime Isayama	Kodansha	1,130,508	
15	April 14–20	Detective Conan, 83	Gosho Aoyama	Shogakukan	266,073	
16	April 21–27	Magi: The Labyrinth of Magic, 21	Shinobu Ohtaka	Shogakukan	195,299	
17	April 28–May 4	Naruto, 69	Masashi Kishimoto	Shueisha	444,725	
18	May 6–11	Naruto, 69	Masashi Kishimoto	Shueisha	279,127	
19	May 12–18	Fairy Tail, 43	Hiro Mashima	Kodansha	181,569	
20	May 19–25	Terra Formars, 9	Yū Sasuga and Kenichi Tachibana	Shueisha	328,545	
21	May 26–June 1	Saint Young Men, 10	Hikaru Nakamura	Kodansha	189,059	
22	June 2–8	One Piece, 74	Eiichiro Oda	Shueisha	1,852,750	
23	June 9–15	One Piece, 74	Eiichiro Oda	Shueisha	404,165	
24	June 16–22	The Seven Deadly Sins, 9	Nakaba Suzuki	Kodansha	180,357	
25	June 23–29	Black Butler, 19	Yana Toboso	Square Enix	222,195	
26	June 30–July 6	Kuroko's Basketball, 28	Tadatoshi Fujimaki	Shueisha	320,990	
27	July 7–13	Blue Exorcist, 13	Kazue Katō	Shueisha	186,567	
28	July 14–20	Fairy Tail, 44	Hiro Mashima	Kodansha	237,059	
29	July 21–27	Inu x Boku SS, 11	Cocoa Fujiwara	Square Enix	252,606	
30	July 28–August 3	A Certain Scientific Railgun, 10	Kazuma Kamachi, Motoi Fuyukawa	ASCII Media Works	134,657	
31	August 4–10	Attack on Titan, 14	Hajime Isayama	Kodansha	852,757	
32	August 11–17	Attack on Titan, 14	Hajime Isayama	Kodansha	487,481	
