= List of Vagabond chapters =

This is a list of chapters for the Japanese manga series Vagabond, written and illustrated by Takehiko Inoue. It portrays a fictionalized account of the life of Japanese swordsman Musashi Miyamoto, based on Eiji Yoshikawa's novel Musashi. It has been serialized in Kodansha's seinen manga magazine Morning since September 1998, with its chapters collected into thirty-seven tankōbon volumes as of July 2014.

Viz Media began releasing Vagabond in English in North America in 2002. Their release retains the color pages from the series' magazine run, and the company has published 37 volumes as of April 21, 2015. Viz's release is distributed in Australasia by Madman Entertainment. In 2008, Viz began re-releasing the series in a format that collects three of the volumes into one. There are currently 12 VIZBIG editions released.

Inoue posted an update on his website in December 2010, stating that Vagabond would not return until he regained "enthusiasm" for the series. After eighteen-months, Vagabond returned to Morning as a monthly series in March 2012. The manga went on what was supposed to be a four-month hiatus in February 2014, with the reason stated being for Inoue to work on research. However, it was not until January 2015 that the series resumed. The series is currently on an extended hiatus since May 21, 2015, with its 327th chapter, "The Man named Tadaoki", being the latest chapter.

== Volumes ==
No.	Original release date	Original ISBN	English release date	English ISBN
1	March 23, 1999	978-4-06-328619-9	April 5, 2002	978-1-59116-034-2
1. "Shinmen Takezō" (新免武蔵様, Shinmen Takezō Sama); 2. "Akemi" (朱実, Akemi); 3. "Okō" (お甲, Okō); 4. "The Brigand Tsujikaze" (野武士辻風, Nobushi Tsujikaze); 5. "Blood Game" (血遊び, Chi Asobi); 6. "The Troubles of Hon'iden Matahachi at Seventeen" (本位田又八17歳の懊悩, Hon'iden Matahachi 17 Sai no Ōnō); 7. "Farewell Takezō" (さらば武蔵, Saraba Takezō); 8. "Miyamoto Village" (宮本村, Miyamoto-mura); 9. "Fiancée" (許嫁, Iinazuke); 10. "Left Behind" (残された者たち, Nokosareta Mono Tachi)
2	March 23, 1999	978-4-06-328620-5	July 6, 2002	978-1-59116-035-9
11. "Demon" (悪鬼, Akki); 12. "Takuan" (沢庵, Takuan); 13. "Life" (生, Sei); 14. "Cut Down" (斬死, Kirijini); 15. "No Fear" (怖くない, Kowakunai); 16. "Captured" (捕獲, Hokaku); 17. "Invincible Under the Sun" (天下無双, Tenka Musō); 18. "Tree of Shame" (樹上の恥, Jujō no Haji); 19. "The Demon's Child" (鬼の子, Oni no Ko); 20. "Death" (死, Shi); 21. "A Place in the Sun" (光のある場所, Hikari no Aru Basho)
3	July 22, 1999	978-4-06-328644-1	October 6, 2002	978-1-59116-049-6
22. "Miyamoto Musashi" (宮本武蔵, Miyamoto Musashi); 23. "First Step" (田舎者の一歩, Inakamono no Ippo); 24. "The Challenge" (挑戦, Chōsen); 25. "Chaos at the Yoshioka School" (吉岡騒然, Yoshioka Sōzen); 26. "The Master" (当主, Tōshu); 27. "Instinct" (本能, Honnō); 28. "Demon II" (悪鬼2, Akki 2); 29. "Ignorance" (世間知らず, Seken Shirazu); 30. "A Single Stroke" (一の太刀, Hitotsu no Tachi); 31. "Inferno" (業火, Gōka)
4	October 22, 1999	978-4-06-328658-8	January 2003	978-1-56931-854-6
32. "Wanderers" (放浪者たち, Hōrōsha Tachi); 33. "Departures" (旅立ち, Tabidachi); 34. "Departures II" (旅立ち2, Tabidachi 2); 35. "Distraction" (とらわれ, Toraware); 36. "Hōzōin" (宝蔵院, Hōzōin); 37. "Bloodthirst" (殺気, Sakki); 38. "Graceless" (不細工, Busaiku); 39. "Inshun" (胤舜, Inshun); 40. "Agon" (阿厳, Agon)
5	January 21, 2000	978-4-06-328672-4	March 2003	978-1-56931-893-5
41. "The Assassin" (刺客, Shikaku); 42. "Howl" (咆哮, Hōkō); 43. "Inshun's Spear" (二代目の槍, Nidaime no Yari); 44. "Life" (命, Inochi); 45. "Unease" (不安, Fuan); 46. "The Demon Within" (魔, Ma); 47. "Fear" (恐怖, Kyōfu); 48. "Fear II" (恐怖2, Kyōfu 2); 49. "Fear III" (恐怖3, Kyōfu 3)
6	April 21, 2000	978-4-06-328685-4	July 2003	978-1-56931-894-2
50. "Surviving" (永らえる, Nagaraeru); 51. "Lying Low" (雌伏, Shifuku); 52. "Lying Low II" (雌伏2, Shifuku 2); 53. "Journey" (道程, Michinori); 54. "Vision" (見切り, Mikiri); 55. "The Decision of a Formerly Kept Man" (ヒモだった男の決心, Himo Datta Otoko no Kesshin); 56. "Osaka" (大坂, Ōsaka); 57. "Vermin" (クソ虫, Kusomushi); 58. "Sasaki Kojirō" (佐々木小次郎, Sasaki Kojirō); 59. "Hōzōin Pickles" (宝蔵院漬, Hōzōin Zuke)
7	July 21, 2000	978-4-06-328702-8	October 15, 2003	978-1-59116-073-1
60. "Duel's Eve" (前夜, Zen'ya); 61. "Duel's Eve II" (前夜2, Zen'ya 2); 62. "Dawn" (夜明け, Yoake); 63. "Spider's Thread" (蜘蛛の糸, Kumo no Ito); 64. "Heaven and Earth" (天地自然, Tenchi Shizen); 65. "Legacy" (伝えるもの, Tsutaeru Mono); 66. "The Master" (師, Shi); 67. "Kami'izumi Ise no Kami Hidetsuna" (上泉伊勢守秀綱, Kamiizumi Ise no Kami Hidetsuna); 68. "No Sword" (無刀, Mutō)
8	October 23, 2000	978-4-06-328720-2	December 31, 2003	978-1-59116-119-6
69. "Life II" (命2, Inochi 2); 70. "Life III" (命3, Inochi 3); 71. "Inshun" (胤舜, Inshun); 72. "Shinnosuke" (慎之介, Shinnosuke); 73. "Playing in the Sand" (砂遊び, Suna Asobi); 74. "Sudden Storm" (驟雨, Shūu); 75. "Survivors" (生還, Seikan); 76. "Don't Put Your Life on the Line" (命を奪い合うことなく, Inochi o Ubaiau Koto Naku); 77. "They Call Me Sensei" (先生と呼ばれて, Sensei to Yobarete); 78. "Ascending Dragon" (昇り竜, Nobori Ryū)
9	February 21, 2001	978-4-06-328736-3	March 31, 2004	978-1-59116-256-8
79. "The Yagyū" (柳生, Yagyū); 80. "Coming Home" (帰郷, Kikyō); 81. "The Peony Message" (芍薬の使者, Shakuyaku no Shisha); 82. "Successor to the Invincible" (天下無双を継ぐ者, Tenka Musō o Tsugu Mono); 83. "Legacy" (相伝, Sōden); 84. "Promise" (約束, Yakusoku); 85. "Ship of Stone" (石の舟, Ishi no Fune); 86. "A Round of Discussion" (円座, Enza); 87. "Provocateur" (乱波者, Rappamono)
10	May 23, 2001	978-4-06-328755-4	May 5, 2004	978-1-59116-340-4
88. "Disciple" (弟子, Deshi); 89. "One Man Battle" (一人対一城, Hitori Tai Ichijō); 90. "The Battle" (合戦, Kassen); 91. "Bamboo Flute" (笛, Fue); 92. "The Four Senior Disciples" (四高弟, Shi Kōtei); 93. "Valor" (豪傑, Gōketsu); 94. "Retribution" (成敗, Seibai); 95. "Longing" (そばにいたい, Soba ni Itai); 96. "Reunion" (再会, Saikai); 97. "Sliding Door" (障子, Shōji)
11	August 20, 2001	978-4-06-328763-9	June 16, 2004	978-1-59116-396-1
98. "Unrivaled" (無双, Musō); 99. "Son of the Invincible" (天下無双の仔, Tenka Musō no Ko); 100. "The Real Thing" (真贋, Shingan); 101. "Blue Sky" (蒼天, Sōten); 102. "The Infinite Universe" (天下無限, Tenka Mugen); 103. "Farewell at Dawn" (暁の別れ, Akatsuki no Wakare); 104. "Autumn Sky" (秋空, Akizora); 105. "Journey" (旅路, Tabiji); 106. "Footprints" (足痕, Ashiato); 107. "The Road to Ise" (伊勢路, Iseji)
12	November 22, 2001	978-4-06-328779-0	July 7, 2004	978-1-59116-434-0
108. "Summit" (てっぺん, Teppen); 109. "Sea of Clouds" (雲海, Unkai); 110. "Uncle Gon" (権叔父, Gon Oji); 111. "Lowlife" (下衆と呼ばれて, Gesu to Yobarete); 112. "Mother" (おふくろ, Ofukuro); 113. "Osugi's Ordeal" (婆受難, Baba Junan); 114. "He and I" (彼我, Higa); 115. "Apparition" (亡霊, Bōrei); 116. "Baiken" (梅軒, Baiken); 117. "Chain and Sickle" (鎖鎌, Kusarigama)
13	March 22, 2002	978-4-06-328804-9	August 10, 2004	978-1-59116-451-7
118. "Rindō" (龍胆, Rindō); 119. "The Girl and the God of Death" (死神と少女, Shinigami to Shōjo); 120. "The Resurrection of the God of Death" (死神再生, Shinigami Saisei); 121. "Two Swords" (二刀, Nitō); 122. "Moths" (「毒蛾」, "Dokuga"); 123. "Akebi Fruit" (あけび, Akebi); 124. "Connections" (つながり, Tsunagari); 125. "Spiral" (螺旋, Rasen); 126. "Tsujikaze Kōhei: Part One" (─特別編─ 辻風黄平 ＜前編＞, Tokubetsu Hen Tsujikaze Kōhei Zenpen); 127. "Tsujikaze Kohei: Part Two" (─特別編─ 辻風黄平 ＜後編＞, Tokubetsu Hen Tsujikaze Kōhei Kōhen)
14	June 21, 2002	978-4-06-328823-0	September 7, 2004	978-1-59116-452-4
128. "The Letter" (手紙, Tegami); 129. "Hands" (手, Te); 130. "Glimmering Waves" (光る波, Hikaru Nami); 131. "Seaweed" (藻屑, Mokuzu); 132. "Fate" (運命, Unmei); 133. "To Live by the Sword" (剣一筋, Ken Hitosuji); 134. "Driftwood" (流木, Ryūboku); 135. "The Plan" (蠢動, Shundō); 136. "Kojirō and Tenki" (小次郎と天鬼, Kojirō to Tenki)
15	October 23, 2002	978-4-06-328850-6	October 12, 2004	978-1-59116-453-1
137. "A Gift From the Sea" (海からの授かりもの, Umi kara no Sazukarimono); 138. "Farewell, Kojirō" (さらば小次郎, Saraba Kojirō); 139. "Butterfly" (揚羽蝶, Agehachō); 140. "Flames" (炎, Honō); 141. "Sword Against Sword" (剣と剣, Ken to Ken); 142. "Savior" (救い神, Sukuigami); 143. "The Kanemaki Dōjō" (鐘巻道場, Kanemaki Dōjō)
16	February 21, 2003	978-4-06-328871-1	November 10, 2004	978-1-59116-454-8
144. "Master and Pupil" (師弟, Shitei); 145. "The Fifth Year of Keichō (1600)" (慶長五年, Keichō Go Nen); 146. "Senior Disciple" (兄弟子, Anideshi); 147. "Jisai's Cocoon" (自斎の繭, Jisai no Mayu); 148. "Tiger" (虎, Tora); 149. "Blood Bath" (狂宴, Kyōen); 150. "Mad Tiger" (狂虎, Kyōko)
17	June 23, 2003	978-4-06-328891-9	December 14, 2004	978-1-59116-455-5
151. "Numb" (鈍き者, Nibuki Mono); 152. "Brothers" (兄弟, Kyōdai); 153. "Blood Battle" (血闘, Kettō); 154. "Shore of Blood" (血海, Kekkai); 155. "The Departure" (旅出, Tabide); 156. "A Complete Life" (人生のすべて, Jinsei no Subete); 157. "Ganryū" (巌流, Ganryū)
18	November 20, 2003	978-4-06-328916-9	January 11, 2005	978-1-59116-642-9
158. "Musō Gonnosuke" (夢想権之助, Musō Gonnosuke); 159. "The Stage" (舞台, Butai); 160. "Battlefield" (戦場, Senjō); 161. "Those Who Defy Death" (死を賭した者, Shi o Toshita Mono); 162. "Rampage of the Beast" (獣乱舞, Kemono Ranbu); 163. "Six O'Clock at Sekigahara" (関ヶ原午後六時, Sekigahara Gogo Roku Ji); 164. "Refugee Hunters" (落武者狩り, Ochimusha Gari)
19	March 23, 2004	978-4-06-328945-9	February 15, 2005	978-1-59116-643-6
165. "Death Torches" (鬼火, Onibi); 166. "First Friend" (初めての友だち, Hajimete no Tomodachi); 167. "Mountain of Shattered Dreams" (夢散る山, Yume Chiru Yama); 168. "Over the Mountain" (この山の向こう, Kono Yama no Mukō); 169. "The Distant Ocean" (遠き海, Tōki Umi); 170. "Strands of the Departed" (遺髪, Ihatsu); 171. "The Sword" (刀, Katana)
20	July 23, 2004	978-4-06-328970-1	March 15, 2005	978-1-59116-583-5
172. "Sons" (息子, Musuko); 173. "The Desire to Fight" (斬り合いたい, Kiriaitai); 174. "Ichizō" (市三, Ichizō); 175. "Younger Brother" (弟, Otōto); 176. "Open Mind" (虚心, Kyoshin); 177. "Koun and Kojirō" (巨雲と小次郎, Koun to Kojirō); 178. "Koun and Kojirō Part II" (巨雲と小次郎2, Koun to Kojirō 2); 179. "Koun and Kojirō Part III" (巨雲と小次郎3, Koun to Kojirō 3)
21	September 21, 2005	978-4-06-372464-6	June 20, 2006	978-1-4215-0741-5
180. "Gathering in Kyoto" (京に集う, Kyō ni Tsudou); 181. "Carving Demons" (鬼を彫る, Oni o Horu); 182. "First Snow" (初雪舞う, Hatsuyuki Mau); 183. "The Same Moon" (同じ月, Onaji Tsuki); 184. "Eagle and Ant" (鷲と蟻, Washi to Ari); 185. "Rendaiji" (蓮台寺野, Rendaijino); 186. "Altercation After Dark" (斬り合いの夜, Kiriai no Yoru); 187. "Before Dawn" (夜明け前, Yoake Mae); 188. "A Place to Exist" (居場所, Ibasho)
22	February 23, 2006	978-4-06-372497-4	August 15, 2006	978-1-4215-0818-4
189. "Burdened" (背負いしもの, Seoishi Mono); 190. "The Death of Seijūrō" (清十郎の死, Seijūrō no Shi); 191. "Painting with Water" (水で絵を描く, Mizu de E o Kaku); 192. "Kōetsu and Myōshū" (光悦と妙秀, Kōetsu to Myōshū); 193. "Bedlam in Kyoto" (京騒乱, Kyō Sōran); 194. "Talk of the Town" (京の有名人, Kyō no Yūmeijin); 195. "Confrontation of Rivals" (両雄相見ゆ, Ryōyū Aimamiyu); 196. "Return of the Vainglorious" (天狗来る, Tengu Kitaru); 197. "The Real Kojirō" (本物, Honmono)
23	June 23, 2006	978-4-06-372526-1	October 17, 2006	978-1-4215-0826-9
198. "Grass, Snow, and Blood" (草・雪・血, Kusa - Yuki - Chi); 199. "Kojirō and Matahachi" (小次郎と又八, Kojirō to Matahachi); 200. "Two Kojirōs" (ふたり小次郎, Futari Kojirō); 201. "Ladder to Success" (大出世への梯子, Dai Shusse e no Hashigo); 202. "Presumptuous" (増長, Zōchō); 203. "The Day After Tomorrow" (明後日, Asatte); 204. "Sword Sharpening" (刀を研ぐ, Katana o Togu); 205. "Sottaku" (啐啄, Sottaku); 206. "Straightforward" (愚直, Guchoku)
24	October 23, 2006	978-4-06-372553-7	February 20, 2007	978-1-4215-0827-6
207. "Afternoon Nap" (午睡, Gosui); 208. "Chance Encounter" (邂逅, Kaikō); 209. "A Long Detour" (回り道, Mawarimichi); 210. "Rivals at Play" (戯れ敵, Tawamuregataki); 211. "On the Eve of Battle" (前夜, Zen'ya); 212. "Bright New Morning" (朝には紅顔ありて, Ashita ni wa Kōgan Arite); 213. "Worthless Junk" (ガラクタ, Garakuta); 214. "Rengeōin" (蓮華王院, Rengeōin); 215. "It's Already Begun" (コウキル, Kō Kiru)
25	March 23, 2007	978-4-06-372582-7	May 15, 2007	978-1-4215-0975-4
216. "A Year After" (a year after, A Iyā Afutā); 217. "Denshichirō Advances" (伝七郎前へ, Denshichirō Mae e); 218. "Demise" (絶命, Zetsumei); 219. "Unbreakable Bonds" (分かち難き結びつき, Wakachigataki Musubitsuki); 220. "Admiration and Hate" (尊敬と憎悪, Sonkei to Zōo); 221. "Old Friends" (旧友, Kyūyū); 222. "Friends" (ともだち, Tomodachi); 223. "From the Treetop" (樹上ニテ想フ, Jujō Nite Omou); 224. "Ichijōji Sagarimatsu" (一乗寺下り松, Ichijōji Sagarimatsu)
26	July 23, 2007	978-4-06-372612-1	October 23, 2007	978-1-4215-1983-8
225. "Musashi Against Seventy Samurai" (武蔵と七十余名の男たち, Musashi to Nana Jū Yo Mei no Otoko Tachi); 226. "Debt to the Yoshioka" (吉岡の懐, Yoshioka no Futokoro); 227. "Army of One" (孤軍, Kogun); 228. "Swarm" (グチャグチャに, Guchagucha ni); 229. "The Rapids" (激流, Gekiryū); 230. "Sallowed Sky" (黄色い空, Kiiroi Sora); 231. "Exhaustion" (疲弊, Hihei); 232. "Life" (Life, Raifu); 233. "It Finds a Way" (It Finds The Way, Itto Fainzu za Wei)
27	November 29, 2007	978-4-06-372640-4	March 18, 2008	978-1-4215-2008-7
234. "The Onslaught" (累累, Ruirui); 235. "The Depth" (その深みに, Sono Fukami ni); 236. "Battle Threshold" (斬り合いの果て, Kiriai no Hate); 237. "Somewhere Along the Way" (道なかば, Michi Nakaba); 238. "Changing Times" (時代の必然, Jidai no Hitsuzen); 239. "Blood-Stained Mud" (血の泥, Chi no Doro); 240. "An Auspicious Encounter" (得難き出会い, Egataki Deai); 241. "One Sword" (一の太刀, Hitotsu no Tachi); 242. "Battle's End" (終戦, Shūsen)
28	May 23, 2008	978-4-06-372685-5	October 21, 2008	978-1-4215-2708-6
243. "Frogs" (蛙, Kaeru); 244. "A Path All His Own" (独行道, Dokkōdō); 245. "Reunion" (再会, Saikai); 246. "The Two Stay the Same" (昔と同じ二人, Mukashi to Onaji Futari); 247. "While You Were Sleeping" (お前が眠っている間に, Omae ga Nemutteiru Aida ni); 248. "Heartbeat" (鼓動, Kodō); 249. "Rumors of Musashi" (噂の男, Uwasa no Otoko); 250. "An End to Fighting" (闘いの終わり, Tatakai no Owari); 251. "Prayer" (祈り, Inori)
29	November 28, 2008	978-4-06-372750-0	May 19, 2009	978-1-4215-3148-9
252. "Captive Musashi" (捕らわれの武蔵, Toraware no Musashi); 253. "To Live by the Sword" (剣に生きるということ, Ken ni Ikiru to Iu Koto); 254. "Home" (HOME, Hōmu); 255. "Question" (質問, Shitsumon); 256. "A Voice" (声, Koe); 257. "Contradiction" (矛盾, Mujun); 258. "The Inner Light" (奥の光, Oku no Hikari); 259. "The Twig" (マダコエダ, Mada Koeda); 260. "Flame of Vengeance" (怨念の炎, Onnen no Honō)
30	May 28, 2009	978-4-06-372795-1	November 17, 2009	978-1-4215-3438-1
261. "Moonlight" (月光, Gekkō); 262. "Farewell" (別れ, Wakare); 263. "Dream Fulfilled" (夢の顚末, Yume no Tenmatsu); 264. "Mirage" (陽炎, Kagerō); 265. "That's All It Was..." (ただそれだけの, Tada Sore dake no); 266. "Two Pieces of a Whole" (片割れ, Kataware); 267. "Crossroads" (岐路, Kiro); 268. "On the Edge of the Sword" (on the edge of the sword, On ji Ejji obu za Sōdo); 269. "The Light" (光, Hikari)
31	September 3, 2009	978-4-06-372827-9	January 19, 2010	978-1-4215-3631-6
270. "Drifter" (漂泊者, Hyōhakusha); 271. "Enter the Circle" (環の中, Wa no Naka); 272. "Going Home with Broken Dreams" (夢破れて故郷に帰る, Yume Yaburete Furusato ni Kaeru); 273. "Mother and Child" (母と子, Haha to Ko); 274. "Mother" (おふくろ, Ofukuro); 275. "Liar" (嘘つき, Usotsuki); 276. "Chance Encounter" (邂逅, Kaikō); 277. "Friends" (友達, Tomodachi); 278. "Treasure" (宝, Takara)
32	January 15, 2010	978-4-06-372866-8	August 17, 2010	978-1-4215-3813-6
279. "Admiration" (憧れ, Akogare); 280. "Sword Demon Ittōsai" (剣鬼一刀斎, Kenki Ittōsai); 281. "Falling Star" (巨星堕つ, Kyosei Otsu); 282. "This Shape" (このかたち, Kono Katachi); 283. "Thirteen" (十三才, Jū San Sai); 284. "Spiral" (螺旋, Rasen); 285. "Learning to Smile" (Learning to Smile, Rāningu tū Sumairu); 286. "Tiger vs. Tiger" (トラトトラ, Tora to Tora); 287. "Nonsense About No Sword"" (無刀だとかの類, Mutō Da to ka no Tagui)
33	May 27, 2010	978-4-06-372903-0	October 19, 2010	978-1-4215-3814-3
288. "Kokura" (小倉, Kokura); 289. "Inner Music" (内側の音楽, Uchigawa no Ongaku); 290. "Life Among Men" (人の世, Hito no Yo); 291. "Seven Years" (7 years, Sebun Iyāzu); 292. "Faces" (横顔, Yokogao); 293. "Mist" (靄, Moya); 294. "Give It Up" (あきらめ, Akirame); 295. "Paper Balloon" (紙風船, Kami Fūsen); 296. "Kojirō's Town" (小次郎の町, Kojirō no Machi)
34	October 23, 2012	978-4-06-372947-4	March 19, 2013	978-1-4215-4930-9
297. "Too Flashy" (派手すぎる, Hade Sugiru); 298. "Instructor" (指南役, Shinan'yaku); 299. "Doryū" (土竜, Mogura); 300. "The Future of Our Clan" (我が藩の未来, Waga Han no Mirai); 301. "Path's End" (旅路の果てに, Tabiji no Hate ni); 302. "Child of the Earth" (土の子供, Tsuchi no Kodomo); 303. "Flood Soil" (あめつち, Ametsuchi)
35	April 23, 2013	978-4-06-387195-1	March 18, 2014	978-1-4215-6445-6
304. "Overflow" (あふれみず, Afure Mizu); 305. "The Path of Water" (水の路, Mizu no Michi); 306. "Infinite Smile" (無限の微笑, Mugen no Bishō); 307. "The Tip" (先っちょ, Sakitcho); 308. "Locust" (蝗, Inago); 309. "Soil" (土, Tsuchi)
36	October 23, 2013	978-4-06-387261-3	October 21, 2014	978-1-4215-6953-6
310. "Late Autumn" (晩秋, Banshū); 311. "Brimming with Life" (にぎやかな命, Nigiyaka na Inochi); 312. "Rice Field of Fools" (阿呆共の田んぼ, Ahō Domo no Tanbo); 313. "The Dead and the Living" (屍と命, Shikabane to Inochi); 314. "Breath" (呼吸, Kokyū); 315. "When the Water Turns Warm" (水ぬるむ頃, Mizu Nurumu Koro)
37	July 23, 2014	978-4-06-388340-4	April 21, 2015	978-1-4215-7744-9
316. "Spring Lightning" (春雷, Shunrai); 317. "Pure and Clean" (清浄明潔, Seijō Meiketsu); 318. "Rice Sprouts" (早苗, Sanae); 319. "Frail" (かよわきもの, Kayowaki Mono); 320. "Ridgeway" (畦道, Azemichi); 321. "Shūsaku Falls" (秀作倒る, Shūsaku Taoru); 322. "Akitsu" (秋津, Akitsu)

== Chapters not yet in volume format ==
The following chapters have yet to be published in a volume.

323. "Travel Clothes" (旅衣, Tabigoromo)
324. "Kokura's Treasure" (小倉の宝, Kokura no Takara)
325. "Noted Treasure" (名宝, Meihō)
326. "To Be a Samurai" (侍たるもの, Samurai Taru Mono)
327. "The Man Named Tadaoki" (忠興という名の, Tadaoki to Iu Na no)
