= List of Saki chapters =

Cover art of the first manga volume featuring its title character Saki Miyanaga

Saki (咲－Saki－) is a seinen manga series written and illustrated by Ritz Kobayashi. The series follows the title character Saki Miyanaga who plays competitive Japanese Mahjong, also called Rīchi Mahjong, for her high school club.

Saki is published in the twice monthly Square Enix manga magazine Young Gangan and began serialization in its June 16, 2006, issue. Kobayashi previously placed the series on hiatus for several weeks in 2009 and 2011. The series is published in Taiwan by Tong Li Publishing under the title Tiāncái Májiàng Shàonǚ (天才麻將少女, literally "Genius Mahjong Girl"). Yen Press publishes an English digital version. The series has two spin-off manga series. Saki Biyori is a 4-panel manga series written by Saya Kiyoshi, which began serialization in Young Gangan from June 17, 2011. Saki Achiga-hen episode of Side-A is a side-story written by Kobayashi and illustrated by Aguri Igarashi, which began serialisation in Monthly Shōnen Gangan from August 12, 2011. The story follows Nodoka Haramura's former classmate, Shizuno Takakamo, who revives her school's mahjong club with the dream of facing Nodoka in the inter-high national championships. Saki was adapted into an anime television series by Gonzo which aired in 2009 while an anime adaptation of Saki Achiga-hen by Studio Gokumi began airing in 2012.

== Volume list ==
=== Saki ===
No.	Original release date	Original ISBN	English release date	English ISBN
1	December 25, 2006	978-4-7575-1782-0	December 29, 2015	978-0-316-35494-3
Chapter 1: Encounter (出会い, "Deai"); Chapter 2: Rematch (再戦, "Saisen"); Chapter 3/Hand 0: Showdown (勝負, "Shōbu"); Hand 1: Confrontation (対立, "Tairitsu"); Hand 2. Reason (理由, "Riyū"); Hand 3: Mahjong Parlor (雀荘, "Jansō"); Hand 4: Toyed With (翻弄, "Honrō"); Hand 5: Crushing Defeat (惨敗, "Sanpai, Zanpai"); Hand 6: Decision (決意, "Ketsui"); Bonus Manga: Fruit Milk and Invisible Stars (フルーツ牛乳と見えない星, "Furūtsu Gyūnyū to Mienai Hoshi")
First-year Kiyosumi High School student Saki Miyanaga is invited by childhood friend Kyōtarō Suga to visit his mahjong club. Believing Saki to be an amateur player, Kyōtarō and fellow first-year club members Nodoka Haramura and Yūki Kataoka play several games with her. Nodoka, who won the national middle school individual tournament the previous year, wins all three games before Saki leaves. However, club president Hisa Takei observes that each game ended with Saki's total points unchanged; Hisa believes Saki is able to manipulate her own score. Nodoka confronts Saki, who reveals that the habit is a result of playing mahjong with family members who would become angry if she wins and confiscate her New Year's gift if she loses. On the following day, Hisa lends Saki a book that was missing from the library; Saki must play several more games with the club in exchange. In the first game Nodoka, Yūki, and second-year member Mako Someya unsuccessfully attempts to prevent her from manipulating her points. Saki wins the second game when Hisa assigns her an imaginary scoring handicap. Saki's first experience in winning convinces her to join the club, and its members soon begin preparing for the preliminaries of the national high school team tournament several weeks away.
2	May 25, 2007	978-4-7575-2019-6	February 23, 2016	978-0-316-27534-7
Hand 7: Qualifier (予選, "Yosen"); Hand 8: First Battle (初陣, "Uijin"); Hand 9: Descent (降臨, "Kōrin"); Hand 10: The Fastest (最速, "Saisoku"); Hand 11: Tradition (伝統, "Dentō"); Hand 12: Final Four (四強, "Yonkyō"); Hand 13: Pillage (奪略, "Datsuryaku"); Hand 14: Advance (前進, "Zenshin"); Hand 15: Enlightenment (開眼, "Kaigan")
3	November 24, 2007	978-4-7575-2164-3	April 26, 2016	978-0-316-27536-1
Hand 16: Vulnerable (危急, "Kikyū"); Hand 17: Beginner (素人, "Shirōto"); Hand 18: Stolen Property (盗品, "Tōhin"); Hand 19: Omen (予兆, "Yochō"); Hand 20: Captain (部長, "Buchō"); Hand 21: Torn Cloth (裂帛, "Reppaku"); Hand 22: Trick (手品, "Tejina"); Hand 23: Pursuit (追撃, "Tsuigeki"); Hand 24: Switch (交代, "Kōtai")
4	June 25, 2008	978-4-7575-2316-6	June 28, 2016	978-0-316-27538-5
Hand 25: Friend (友達, "Tomodachi"); Hand 26: Theory (理論, "Riron"); Hand 27: Incomplete (未完, "Mikan"); Hand 28: Abnormality (異変, "Ihen"); Hand 29: A Different Person (別人, "Betsujin, Betsunin"); Hand 30: Perfect Game (完勝, "Kanshō"); Hand 31: Block (阻止, "Soshi"); Hand 32: Senpai (先輩, "Senpai"); Hand 33: Conclusion (決着, "Kecchaku")
5	March 25, 2009	978-4-7575-2517-7	August 30, 2016	978-0-316-50399-0
Hand 34: Demon (魔物, "Mamono"); Hand 35: Disturbance (波乱, "Haran"); Hand 36: Full Moon (満月, "Mangetsu"); Hand 37: Bottom of the Sea (海底, "Haitei"); Hand 38: Conspiracy (結託, "Kettaku"); Hand 39: Fate (運命, "Unmei"); Hand 40: Far Ahead (独走, "Dokusō"); Hand 41: Confidence (自信, "Jishin"); Hand 42: Nightmare (悪夢, "Akumu")
6	July 25, 2009	978-4-7575-2623-5	October 25, 2016	978-0-316-55309-4
Hand 43: Predicament (窮地, "Kyūchi"); Hand 44: Roar (砲号, "Hōgō"); Hand 45: Release (解放, "Kaihō"); Hand 46: Breakaway (脱却, "Dakkyaku"); Hand 47: Cheap Hand (安手, "Yasude"); Hand 48: Transcendence (超越, "Chōetsu"); Hand 49: Specialty (本領, "Honryō"); Hand 50: Raging Wave (怒涛, "Dotō")
7	April 24, 2010	978-4-7575-2859-8	December 20, 2016	978-0-316-50869-8
Hand 51: Confusion (迷乱, "Meiran"); Hand 52: Bloom (開花, "Kaihō"); Hand 53: Victory (勝利, "Shōri"); Hand 54: Aftertaste (余韻, "Yoin"); Hand 55: Ramblings (随想, "Zuisō"); Hand 56: Nationals (全国, "Zenkoku"); Hand 57: Four Schools (四校, "Yonkō"); Hand 58: Training Camp (合宿, "Gasshuku"); Hand 59: Sudden Change (豹変, "Hyōhen"); Hand 60: Ambush (伏兵, "Fukuhei"); Side Story: Tsuruga Extra (つるがいでん, "Tsurugaiden")
8	June 25, 2011	978-4-7575-3272-4	February 28, 2017	978-0-316-50870-4
Hand 61: The Real Deal (本物, "Honmono"); Hand 62: Imitation (模倣, "Mohō"); Hand 63: Adjournment (散会, "Sankai"); Hand 64: To Tokyo (上京, "Jōkyō"); Hand 65: Drawing (抽選, "Chūsen"); Hand 66: Break (休息, "Kyūsoku"); Hand 67: Support (応援, "Ōen"); Hand 68: Start (始動, "Shidō"); Hand 69: Ambition (抱負, "Hōfu"); Hand 70: East Wind (東風, "Tonpū"); Hand 71: Monster (怪物, "Kaibutsu"); Side Story: Round and Vigorous (ふくよかにすこやかに, "Fukuyoka ni Sukoyaka ni")
9	March 24, 2012 (special edition)	978-4-7575-3537-4	April 25, 2017	978-0-316-50872-8
Hand 72: Room to Relax (余裕, "Yoyū"); Hand 73: Foreboding (予感, "Yokan"); Hand 74: Gods and Demons (神鬼, "Sinki"); Hand 75: Recapture (奪回, "Dakkai"); Hand 76: Anxiety (不安, "Huan"); Hand 77: Atrophy (萎縮, "Isyuku"); Hand 78: Comeback (復活, "Fukkatsu"); Hand 79: Complication (交錯, "Kōsaku"); Hand 80: Result (結果, "Kekka"); Hand 81: Attention (注目, "Chūmoku"); Hand 82: Choice (選択, "Sentaku"); Side Story: Takatobara (高遠原, "Takatōbara")
10	June 25, 2012	978-4-7575-3635-7	June 27, 2017	978-0-316-50871-1
Hand 83: Acceleration (加速, "Kasoku"); Hand 84: Opening the Gate (開門, "Kaimon"); Hand 85: Fortress (防塞, "Bōsai"); Hand 86: New Teacher (新任, "Sinnin"); Hand 87: Reoccurrence (再来, "Sairai"); Hand 88: Removal (解除, "Kaijo"); Hand 89: Deployment (出撃, "Shutsugeki"); Hand 90: Mountain Top (嶺上, "Rinsyan"); Hand 91: Pursuit/Capture (追捕, "Tsuibu"); Hand 92: Uncanny (奇怪, "Kikai"); Hand 93: Welcome (歓迎, "Kangei"); Hand 94: Teammate (仲間, "Nakama"); Hand 95: Sacrificial Doll (形代, "Katashiro")
11	April 25, 2013	978-4-7575-3934-1	August 29, 2017	978-0-316-56253-9
Hand 96: Resistance (抵抗, "Teikō"); Hand 97: Three-Player MJ (三麻, "Sanma"); Hand 98: Wonder (脅威, "Kyōi"); Hand 99: Truth (真実, "Shinjitsu"); Hand 100: Introspection (反省, "Hansei"); Hand 101: Dark Clouds (暗雲, "Anun"); Hand 102: Quandry (困惑, "Konwaku"); Hand 103: Reunion (再会, "Saikai"); Hand 104: Past (過去, "kako"); Hand 105: Old Friends (旧友, "Kyūyū"); Hand 106: Taking the Field (出陣, "Shutsujin")
12	December 25, 2013	978-4-7575-4182-5	October 31, 2017	978-0-316-56254-6
Hand 107: Beginning (開始, "Kaishi"); Hand 108: World (世界, "Sekai"); Hand 109: Leading (屈指, "Kusshi"); Hand 110: Explosion (爆発, "Bakuhatsu"); Hand 111: Rapid Blasts (連発, "Renpatsu"); Hand 112: Fierce Enemy (強敵, "Kyōteki"); Hand 113: High Spirits (気炎, "Kien"); Hand 114: Adjustment (調整, "Chōsei"); Hand 115: Rising (新進, "Sinsin"); Hand 116: Chinese Mahjong (麻将, "Marjong"); Hand 117: View (景色, "Keshiki"); Hand 118: Experience (経験, "Keiken")
13	September 25, 2014	978-4-7575-4422-2	December 26, 2017	978-0-316-56255-3
Hand 119: Swimsuits (水着, "Mizugi"); Hand 120: Destiny (因縁, "Innen"); Hand 121: Crisis (危機, "Kiki"); Hand 122: Front Line (戦線, "Sensen"); Hand 123: Retaliation (抗戦, "Kōsen"); Hand 124: Blowing Wind (風候, "Hūkō"); Hand 125: Squall (突風, "Toppū"); Hand 126: Dignity (威風, "Ihū"); Hand 127: Opposition (対抗, "Taikō"); Hand 128: Cool Breeze (涼風, "Ryōhū"); Hand 129: Opportunity (契機, "Keiki"); Hand 130: Value (価値, "Kachi")
14	July 25, 2015	978-4-7575-4490-1	February 27, 2018	978-1-9753-5323-0
Hand 131: Knockdown (打倒, "Datō"); Hand 132: Debt of Gratitude (恩義, "Ongi"); Hand 133: Duel (決闘, "Kettō"); Hand 134: Countermeasure (対策, "Taisaku"); Hand 135: Assault (攻戦, "Kōsen"); Hand 136: Conviction (信念, "Sinnen"); Hand 137: Endurance (辛抱, "Sinbō"); Hand 138: Chance (好機, "Kōki"); Hand 139: Cornered Rat (窮鼠, "Kyūso"); Hand 140: Offense & Defense (攻防, "Kōbō"); Hand 141: Darkness (暗闇, "Kurayami"); Hand 142: Live Feed (中継, "Chūkei")
15	March 25, 2016	978-4-7575-4919-7	May 29, 2018	978-1-9753-0221-4
Hand 143: Expediency (応変, "Ōhen"); Hand 144: Raging Fire (烈火, "Rekka"); Hand 145: Disobeying (背戻, "Hairei"); Hand 146: Despair (絶望, "Zetsubō"); Hand 147: Inheritance (継承, "Keishō"); Hand 148: Swift Strike (速攻, "Sokkō"); Hand 149: Advice (助言, "Joggen"); Hand 150: Chase (追走, "Tsuisō"); Hand 151: Style (流儀, "Ryūgi"); Hand 152: Petal (一片, "Ippen"); Hand 153: Brandish (一閃, "Issen"); Hand 154: Stirring (奮起, "Hunki")
16	December 24, 2016	978-4-7575-5193-0	July 31, 2018	978-1-9753-0223-8
Hand 155: Enlightenment via Training (証果, "Shōka"); Hand 156: Parents (両親, "Ryōshin"); Hand 157: Report (報告, "Hōkoku"); Hand 158: The Night Before (前夜, "Zenya"); Hand 159: Preparation (準備, "Jyunbi"); Hand 160: Fifth-Place Bout (5決, "Goketsu"); Hand 161: Comrades in Arms (戦友, "Senyū"); Hand 162: Premonition (予知, "Yochi"); Hand 163: Burst (炸裂, "Sakuretsu"); Hand 164: Wonderful (素晴, "Subara"); Hand 165: Free-for-All (混戦, "Konsen"); Hand 166: Chance Meeting (邂逅, "kaikō")
17	November 25, 2017	978-4-7575-5530-3	September 25, 2018	978-1-9753-0225-2
Hand 167: Encounter (遭逢, "Sōhō"); Hand 168: Beginning (端緒, "Tanchō"); Hand 169: Proof (証明, "Shōmei"); Hand 170: Sweets (菓子, "Kashi"); Hand 171: Fairness (公平, "Kōhei"); Hand 172: Champion (王者, "Ōja"); Hand 173: Recovery (回復, "Kaihuku"); Hand 174: Worthy Rival (好敵, "Kōteki"); Hand 175: Oil and Water (氷炭, "Hyōtan"); Hand 176: Hard Struggle (奮闘, "Huntō"); Hand 177: Endgame (終盤, "Shūban"); Hand 178: Link (連係, "Renkei")
18	October 25, 2018	978-4-7575-5889-2	January 29, 2019	978-1-9753-5746-7
Hand 179: Tilted Lid (""); Hand 180: Merits & Demerits (""); Hand 181: Give-and-Take (""); Hand 182: Intertwined (""); Hand 183: Lockout (""); Hand 184: Ambush (""); Hand 185: Overheating (""); Hand 186: In the Zone (""); Hand 187: Calm Mind (""); Hand 188: Determination (""); Hand 189: Inheritance (""); Hand 190: Finals ("")
19	May 25, 2019	978-4-7575-6133-5	February 27, 2020	978-1-9753-3285-3
Hand 191: Blessing of Heaven (""); Hand 192: Divine Speed (""); Hand 193: Lord of Dragons (""); Hand 194: Genuine Article (""); Hand 195: One in Sport (""); Hand 196: Growth (""); Hand 197: Guarding (""); Hand 198: Awe (""); Hand 199: Tussle (""); Hand 200: Opening (""); Hand 201: Joint Effort ("")
20	March 25, 2020	978-4-7575-6570-8	May 26, 2020	978-1-9753-1689-1
Hand 202: Blade Fella (""); Hand 203: Divine Wind (""); Hand 204: Sharp (""); Hand 205: Evolution (""); Hand 206: Dragon God (""); Hand 207: Earthshaking (""); Hand 208: Battle Preparations (""); Hand 209: Origin (""); Hand 210: Full Might (""); Hand 211: Partner (""); Hand 212: Decision ("")
21	January 22, 2021	978-4-7575-7046-7	February 22, 2022	978-1-9753-4435-1
Hand 213: Noble Sibling (""); Hand 214: Pair Wait (""); Hand 215: Siege (""); Hand 216: Wide Margin (""); Hand 217: Solidarity (""); Hand 218: Tenacity (""); Hand 219: Return to Tokyo (""); Hand 220: Injury (""); Hand 221: Nightmare (""); Hand 222: Wounded (""); Hand 223: Cooking (""); Hand 224: Accumulation ("")
22	November 25, 2021	978-4-7575-7592-9	August 23, 2022	978-1-9753-4947-9
Hand 225: Streaming Arrows (""); Hand 226: Line of Fire (""); Hand 227: Random Thoughts (""); Hand 228: White Heat (""); Hand 229: Target Shooting (""); Hand 230: Pressing Onward (""); Hand 231: Compassionate Heart (""); Hand 232: Misread (""); Hand 233: Short Break (""); Hand 234: Prostrating (""); Hand 235: Duty (""); Hand 236: Tenacity ("")
23	September 24, 2022	978-4-7575-8152-4	October 24, 2023	978-1-9753-6894-4
Hand 237: One Arm (""); Hand 238: Pleasure (""); Hand 239: Joyful (""); Hand 240: Origin (""); Hand 241: Memory (""); Hand 242: Comrades (""); Hand 243: A Crowd (""); Hand 244: Yama (""); Hand 245: Nature-Made (""); Hand 246: Mother (""); Hand 247: Harvest (""); Hand 248: Bubble ("")
24	July 25, 2023	978-4-7575-8682-6	February 27, 2024	978-1-9753-9441-7
Hand 249: Halfway Point (""); Hand 250: Intense Pain (""); Hand 251: Wide Redirection (""); Hand 252: High-Speed (""); Hand 253: Diligence (""); Hand 254: Fruition (""); Hand 255: Offense & Defense (""); Hand 256: Hospitalized (""); Hand 257: Inheritance (""); Hand 258: Awakening (""); Hand 259: Student ① (""); Hand 260: Student ② ("")
25	May 24, 2024	978-4-7575-9201-8		
26	April 24, 2025	978-4-7575-9816-4		
27	March 25, 2026	978-4-301-00412-7		

=== Saki Achiga-hen episode of Side-A ===
No.	Japanese release date	Japanese ISBN
1	March 24, 2012	978-4-7575-3535-0
Round 1. "" (邂逅, "Kaikō"); Round 2. "" (始動, "Shidō"); Round 3. "" (接触, "Sesshoku")
2	June 25, 2012	978-4-7575-3636-4
Round 4. "" (全国, "Zenkoku"); Round 5. "" (強豪, "Kyōgō"); Round 6. "" (奪回, "Dakkai")
3	August 25, 2012	978-4-7575-3709-5
Round 7. "" (修行, "Shugyō"); Round 8. "" (最強, "Kyōgō"); Round 9. "" (連荘, "Renchan"); Round 10. "" (疲弊, "Hihei"); Extra. "" (番外編, "Bangaihen")
4	November 24, 2012	978-4-7575-3809-2
Round 11. "" (決意, "Ketsui"); Round 12. "" (逆襲, "Gyakushū"); Round 13. "" (再会, "Saikai"); Round 14. "" (混戦, "Konsen")
5	April 25, 2013	978-4-7575-3911-2
Round 15. "" (関門, "Kanmon"); Round 16. "" (憧憬, "Shōkei"); Round 17. "" (大将, "Taishō")
6	August 24, 2013	978-4-7575-4052-1
Round 18. "" (激化, "Gekika"); Round 19. "" (本領, "Honryō"); Final Round. "" (軌跡, "Kiseki")
7	January 22, 2021	978-4-7575-7048-1
8	November 25, 2021	978-4-7575-7601-8
9	September 24, 2022	978-4-7575-8155-5

=== Saki Biyori ===
No.	Japanese release date	Japanese ISBN
1	March 24, 2012	978-4-7575-3538-1
2	August 25, 2012	978-4-7575-3708-8
3	December 25, 2013	978-4-7575-4183-2
4	July 25, 2015	978-4-7575-4698-1
5	March 25, 2016	978-4-7575-4938-8
6	December 24, 2016	978-4-7575-5194-7
7	March 24, 2018	978-4-7575-5677-5

=== Side Story of Saki: Shinohayu the Dawn of Age ===
No.	Japanese release date	Japanese ISBN
1	December 25, 2013	978-4-7575-4184-9
Chapter 1. "" (慕①, "Shino 1"); Chapter 2. "" (慕②, "Shino 2"); Chapter 3. "" (慕③, "Shino 3")
2	September 25, 2014	978-4-7575-4423-9
Chapter 4. "" (閑無①, "Kanna 1"); Chapter 5. "" (閑無②, "Kanna 2"); Chapter 6. "" (閑無③, "Kanna 3"); Chapter 7. "" (閑無④, "Kanna 4"); Chapter 8. "" (はやり①, "Hayari 1")
3	February 25, 2015	978-4-7575-4571-7
Chapter 9. "" (はやり②, "Hayari 2"); Chapter 10. "" (はやり③, "Hayari 3"); Chapter 11. "" (はやり④, "Hayari 4"); Chapter 12. "" (はやり⑤, "Hayari 5"); Chapter 13. "" (悠彗①, "Yue 1"); Chapter 14. "" (悠彗②, "Yue 2")
4	July 25, 2015	978-4-7575-4699-8
Chapter 15. "" (悠彗③, "Yue 3"); Chapter 16. "" (湯町の子①, "Yumachi no Ko 1"); Chapter 17. "" (湯町の子②, "Yumachi no Ko 2"); Chapter 18. "" (湯町の子③, "Yumachi no Ko 3"); Chapter 19. "" (湯町の子④, "Yumachi no Ko 4")
5	November 25, 2015	978-4-7575-4811-4
Chapter 20. "" (全国①, "Zenkoku 1"); Chapter 21. "" (全国②, "Zenkoku 2"); Chapter 22. "" (全国③, "Zenkoku 3"); Chapter 23. "" (全国④, "Zenkoku 4"); Chapter 24. "" (全国⑤, "Zenkoku 5")
6	March 25, 2016	978-4-7575-4920-3
Chapter 25. "" (季夏, "Kika"); Chapter 26. "" (一別以来, "Ichibetsuirai"); Chapter 27. "" (修学旅行, "Shūgakuryokō"); Chapter 28. "" (進学, "Shingaku"); Chapter 29. "" (中学, "Chūgaku"); Chapter 30. "" (市大会, "Shitaikai")
7	December 24, 2016	978-4-7575-5195-4
Chapter 31. "" (団体戦, "Dantaisen"); Chapter 32. "" (上級生, "Jōkyūsei"); Chapter 33. "" (中堅戦, "Chūkensen"); Chapter 34. "" (副将戦, "Hukushōsen"); Chapter 35. "" (杏果①, "Kyōka 1"); Chapter 36. "" (杏果②, "Kyōka 2")
8	November 25, 2017	978-4-7575-5531-0
Chapter 37. "" (杏果③, "Kyōka 3"); Chapter 38. "" (早起き, "Hayaoki"); Chapter 39. "" (五月雨傘, "Samidaregasa"); Chapter 40. "" (個人戦, "Kojinsen"); Chapter 41. "" (尾行, "Bikō"); Chapter 42. "" (県大会, "Kentaikai"); Chapter 43. "" (逸事, "Itsuji")
9	March 24, 2018	978-4-7575-5676-8
Chapter 44. "" (強豪, "Kyōgō"); Chapter 45. "" (羽習わし, "Hanenarawashi"); Chapter 46. "" (鷹乃学習, "Taka Sunawachi Waza Wo Narau"); Chapter 47. "" (後前, "Shirisaki"); Chapter 48. "" (縦方, "Tatasama"); Chapter 49. "" (協翼, "Kyōyoku"); Chapter 50. "" (三嘆, "Santan")
10	October 25, 2018	978-4-7575-5890-8
11	May 25, 2019	978-4-7575-6134-2
12	March 25, 2020	978-4-7575-6571-5
13	January 22, 2021	978-4-7575-7047-4
14	November 25, 2021	978-4-7575-7590-5
15	September 24, 2022	978-4-7575-8153-1
16	July 25, 2023	978-4-7575-8683-3
17	May 24, 2024	978-4-7575-9202-5
18	April 24, 2025	978-4-7575-9817-1
19	March 25, 2026	978-4-301-00413-4

=== Toki ===
No.	Japanese release date	Japanese ISBN
1	December 24, 2016	978-4-7575-5196-1
Round 1. "" (折衝, "Sesshō"); Round 2. "" (萌芽, "Hōga"); Round 3. "" (膝枕, "Hizamakura"); Round 4. "" (圧力, "Atsuryoku"); Round 5. "" (辛抱, "Sinbō"); Round 6. "" (友達, "Tomodachi")
2	November 25, 2017	978-4-7575-5532-7
Round 7. "" (竜華①, "Ryūka 1"); Round 8. "" (竜華②, "Ryūka 2"); Round 9. "" (入部, "Nyūbu"); Round 10. "" (既視, "Kishi"); Round 11. "" (陽動, "Yōdō"); Round 12. "" (狙撃, "Sogeki")
3	March 24, 2018	978-4-7575-5678-2
Round 13. "" (夢見, "Yumemi"); Round 14. "" (懐旧, "Kaikyū"); Round 15. "" (参観①, "Sankan 1"); Round 16. "" (参観②, "Sankan 2"); Round 17. "" (面隠, "Omogakushi"); Round 18. "" (邁進, "Maishin"); Round 19. "" (凶星, "Magatsuboshi")
4	October 25, 2018	978-4-7575-5891-5
5	May 25, 2019	978-4-7575-6135-9
6	March 25, 2020	978-4-7575-6572-2
7	January 22, 2021	978-4-7575-7049-8
8	November 25, 2021	978-4-7575-7591-2
9	September 24, 2022	978-4-7575-8154-8
10	July 25, 2023	978-4-7575-8684-0
11	May 24, 2024	978-4-7575-9203-2
12	April 24, 2025	978-4-7575-9818-8
13	March 25, 2026	978-4-301-00414-1

== See also ==
- List of Saki episodes
