= List of Fairy Tail chapters (volumes 31–45) =

The cover of the thirty-first volume of Fairy Tail as published by Kodansha on February 17, 2012, in Japan

Fairy Tail is a Japanese manga series written and illustrated by Hiro Mashima that has been translated into various languages and spawned a substantial media franchise. The series follows the adventures of the dragon-slayer Natsu Dragneel, as he is searching for the dragon Igneel and partners with seventeen-year-old celestial wizard Lucy Heartfilia, who joins the titular guild. In Japan, the series has been published by Kodansha in Weekly Shōnen Magazine since the magazine's issue of August 23, 2006, and in tankōbon format since December 15, 2006. Fairy Tail has 63 volumes and 545 chapters.

In North America, Kodansha USA and Random House currently serializes Fairy Tail in Crunchyroll Manga simultaneously with Japan. The English-language adaptation was originally published by the now-defunct Del Rey Manga beginning in March 2008. Since then, Kodansha USA and Random House replaced Del Ray with the 13th volume in May 2011, reprinting the earlier 12 volumes under their name, and also publishes them digitally on the IOS, iTunes, Kindle and Nook platforms. All 63 English volumes have been released.

== Volume list ==
No.	Original release date	Original ISBN	North American release date	North American ISBN
31	February 17, 2012	978-4-06-384628-7	October 29, 2013	978-1-61262-408-2
258. "Saber Tooth" (剣咬の虎(セイバートゥース), Seibā Tūsu); 259. "Porlyusica" (ポーリュシカ, Pōryushika); 260. "And We're Going to Aim for the Top" (そしてオレたちは頂上を目指す, Soshite Ore-tachi wa Chōjō o Mezasu); 261. "The One Magic" (一なる魔法, Ichinaru Mahō); 262. "Song of the Celestials" (星々の歌, Hoshiboshi no Uta); 263. "Crime Sorcière" (魔女の罪(クリムソルシエール), Kurimu Sorushiēru); 264. "Only the Amount of Time Lost" (すれ違った時間の分だけ, Surechigatta Jikan no Bun dake); 265. "Crocus, the Capital of Blooming Flowers" (花咲く都・クロッカス, Hanasaku Miyako Kurokkasu); 266. "Sky Labyrinth" (空中迷宮(スカイラビリンス), Sukai Rabirinsu)
The returning Fairy Tail members decide to participate in the Grand Magic Games, a tournament held in Fiore's capital Crocus that decides the rank of Fiore's most powerful guild. The reigning champion, Saber Tooth, includes two Dragon Slayers: Sting Eucliffe and Rogue Cheney. The returning members plan to spend training for the tournament in three months' time, but Natsu Dragneel and his friends spend most of their time celebrating their reunion with Lucy Heartfilia's celestial spirits for a day in the celestial world, which lasts three months in the outside world. Soon after, they reunite with the fugitives Jellal Fernandez, Ultear Milkovich, and Merudy, who have founded their own guild called Crime Sorcière. The three double Natsu and his friends' magic power in exchange for their help in determining the source of a magic anomaly they have sensed around the tournament arena. Natsu, Lucy, Gray Fullbuster, Erza Scarlet, and Wendy Marvell form their guild's team for the tournament, but Wendy mysteriously disappears before the preliminary event designed to narrow the competitors down to eight teams. With Elfman Strauss replacing Wendy, the five barely pass the preliminary in last place.
32	April 17, 2012	978-4-06-384654-6	November 19, 2013	978-1-61262-409-9
267. "A New Guild" (新規ギルド, Shinki Girudo); 268. "The Secret Weapon, Team B" (特攻野郎Bチーム, Tokkō Yarō B-Chīmu); 269. "Fade into the Silence" (消えよ 静寂の中に, Kieyo, Shijima no Naka ni); 270. "Night of Falling Stars" (星降ル夜ニ, Hoshi Furu Yoru ni); 271. "Lucy vs. Flare" (ルーシィ vs. フレア, Rūshii vs. Furea); 272. "Graceful Defeat" (気高き敗北者, Kedakaki Haibokusha); 273. "Olga of the Black Lightning" (黒雷のオルガ, Kurorai no Oruga); 274. "Bad Omen" (凶瑞, Kyōzui)
Among the guilds participating in the tournament besides Fairy Tail is Raven Tail, a guild formed by Makarov Dreyar's resentful son, Ivan. The other teams are Saber Tooth, Lamia Scale, Blue Pegasus, Mermaid Heel, Quatro Cerberus, and a second team from Fairy Tail composed of Gajeel Redfox, Laxus Dreyar, Juvia Lockser, Mirajane Strauss, and Jellal disguised as Mystogan. Gray participates in the tournament's first contest, but suffers a humiliating defeat at the hands of Raven Tail's Nullpudding and Saber Tooth's Rufus Lore. Lucy is then pit in battle against Flare Corona from Raven Tail, only to lose after being drained of her magical power by Flare's teammate Obra. Jellal is similarly pit against Jura Neekis, but Ultear forces him to lose the match using Merudy's sensory magic to keep him from exposing his identity to the arena audience. Meanwhile, Carla experiences an ominous vision involving the complete destruction of the king of Fiore's palace around a tearfully singing Lucy.
33	June 15, 2012	978-4-06-384686-7	December 3, 2013	978-1-61262-410-5
275. "Drunken Hawk" (酔いの鷹, Yoi no Taka); 276. "Chariot" (戦車(チャリオット), Chariotto); 277. "Socks" (くつ下, Kutsushita); 278. "Elfman vs. Bacchus" (エルフマン vs. バッカス, Erufuman vs. Bakkasu); 279. "A Door Sunken into Darkness" (暗闇に潜む扉, Kuroyami ni Hisomu Tobira); 280. "Kagura vs. Yukino" (カグラ vs. ユキノ); 281. "Grudges Wrapped in the Curtain of Night" (怨みは夜の帳に包まれて, Urami wa Yoru no Tobari ni Tsutsumarete); 282. "Ten Keys and Two Keys" (十の鍵と二の鍵, Jū no Kagi to Ni no Kagi)
The second day of the tournament begins with a footrace atop a train of moving chariots, causing Natsu, Gajeel, and Sting to suffer from motion sickness. Sting throws the race while Natsu and Gajeel finish behind the other racers. In the battle portion of the tournament, Elfman and Mirajane defeat their respective opponents—Bacchus Glowe from Quatro Cerberus and Jenny Realite from Blue Pegasus—while Saber Tooth's celestial wizard Yukino Agria loses to Kagura Mikazuchi from Mermaid Heel. Meanwhile, Natsu stops a group of mercenaries who kidnap Wendy, mistaking her for Lucy. The kidnapping, thought to have been caused by Raven Tail, is actually the doing of the kingdom's royal army captain Arcadios, who intends to use the twelve Zodiac keys—ten of which are in Lucy's possession—as part of the Eclipse Plan, a plot that involves Zeref. After being humiliated and expelled from Saber Tooth for her loss, Yukino offers the remaining two Zodiac keys to Lucy, who declines. Upon learning of Yukino's situation, Natsu angrily confronts Saber Tooth's master, Ziemma.
34	August 17, 2012	978-4-06-384719-2	January 7, 2014	978-1-61262-411-2
283. "Natsu vs. Saber Tooth" (ナツ vs. 剣咬の虎(セイバートゥース), Natsu vs. Seibā Tūsu); 284. "Pandemonium" (伏魔殿(パンデモニウム), Pandemoniumu); 285. "MPF"; 286. "Laxus vs. Alexei" (ラクサス vs. アレクセイ, Rakusasu vs. Arekusei); 287. "True Family" (本当の家族, Hontō no Kazoku); 288. "Wendy vs. Sherria" (ウェンディ vs. シェリア, Wendi vs. Sheria); 289. "Tiny Fists" (小さな拳, Chiisana Kobushi); 290. "The Night Our Feelings Intersect" (想いが交差する夜, Omoi ga Kōsa suru Yoru); 291. "Naval Battle" (海戦(ナバルバトル), Nabaru Batoru)
Ziemma's daughter, Minerva Orland, offers Natsu to settle the dispute in the tournament, which he accepts. On the third day of the tournament, Erza single-handedly defeats 100 monsters, while Cana Alberona, serving as Jellal's substitute, earns first place in a display of the participants' magical abilities. In the battle portion, Laxus fights against Raven Tail's Alexei, who is actually his father Ivan in disguise, breaching the rule forbidding guild masters from participating in the tournament. Rejecting Ivan's offer to aid Raven Tail, Laxus defeats his father. Raven Tail is disqualified from the tournament, but not before Ivan demands to know where Makarov has hidden Lumen Histoire, Fairy Tail's "light" shown only to the guild's masters. During Wendy's duel against Sherria Blendy of Lamia Scale, Jellal senses a presence similar to Zeref in the arena and suspects Sherria to be the source. His suspicions are disproven as Wendy and Sherria's match ends in a draw, and he goes to search for the real source, but is confronted by Lahar and Doranbalt. Yajima intervenes and secures Jellal's release, but his face is exposed to Kagura and Millianna, who plot to take revenge on him. Minerva brutalizes Lucy on the fourth day's contest, to Saber Tooth's amusement and Fairy Tail's anger.
35	November 16, 2012	978-4-06-384765-9	February 25, 2014	978-1-61262-412-9
292. "Thoughts Joined as One" (想いを一つに, Omoi o Hitotsu ni); 293. "A Gift for You of Perfume" (君に捧げる香り(パルファム), Kimi ni Sasageru Parufamu); 294. "Battle of the Dragon Slayers" (バトル・オブ・ドラゴンスレイヤー, Batoru obu Doragon Sureiyā); 295. "Sting and Lecter" (スティングとレクター, Sutingu to Rekutā); 296. "Natsu vs. Twin Dragons" (ナツ vs. 双竜, Natsu vs. Sōryū); 297. "The Girl's Face He Saw" (その時見た少女の顔は, Sono Toki Mita Shōjo no Kao wa); 298. "Exciting Ryuzetsu Land" (ドキドキ・リュウゼツランド, Dokidoki Ryūzetsu Rando); 299. "Lone Journey" (一人旅, Hitoritabi)
With Raven Tail's removal from the games and Lucy unaccounted for, the two Fairy Tail teams combine into a single team consisting of Natsu, Gajeel, Gray, Erza and Laxus. Natsu and Gajeel are pit in a two-on-two battle against Sting and Rogue, whom they completely overpower. Determined to fulfill his promise to his Exceed friend Lector to defeat Natsu, Sting activates Dragon Force and fights both him and Gajeel alone. He destroys the arena in the process, but Natsu and Gajeel are largely unaffected by his attacks. After sending Gajeel away on a mine cart on the exposed arena basement, Natsu single-handedly defeats Sting and Rogue, earning Fairy Tail first place in the tournament. Meanwhile, Gajeel discovers a dragon graveyard beneath the arena, while Jellal discovers a hooded young woman to be the source of the magic power.
36	February 15, 2013	978-4-06-384810-6	March 25, 2014	978-1-61262-432-7
300. "Where the Dragon Souls Sleep" (竜の魂 眠る場所, Ryū no Tamashii, Nemuru Basho); 301. "The Dragon King" (竜の王, Ryū no Ō); 302. "The Eclipse Plan" (エクリプス計画, Ekuripusu Keikaku); 303. "A Two-Front Battle Plan" (二正面作戦, Nishōmen Sakusen); 304. "The Grand Magic Game" (大魔闘演武, Daimatōenbu); 305. "Fairy Strategist" (妖精軍師, Yōsei Gunshi); 306. "Gray vs. Rufus" (グレイ vs. ルーファス, Gurei vs. Rūfasu); 307. "Hungry Wolf Knights" (餓狼騎士団, Garō Kishidan); 308. "Fairy Tail vs. the Executioners" (FT(フェアリーテイル) vs. 処刑人, Fearī Teiru vs. Shokeinin)
Gajeel brings Natsu and his friends to the dragon graveyard, where Acnologia, the Dragon King, killed several dragons 400 years earlier during a war between dragons over the fate of humanity before becoming a dragon himself. Using one of her spells, Wendy and the others learn about Acnologia from the spirit of the dragon Zirconis. Arcadios and Yukino appear and bring the group to Mercurius, where they reveal that the purpose of the Eclipse Plan is to travel back in time to kill Zeref in his mortal form. However, Fiore's defense minister Darton opposes this plan for its ramifications on the timeline, and captures Arcadios, Yukino, and Lucy. The final day of the Grand Magic Games opens with a battle royale between the guilds. Juvia takes Natsu's place on their team while he, Wendy, Mirajane, Happy, Carla and Panther Lily sneak into Mercurius and rescue Lucy and Yukino. When Hisui E. Fiore, the princess of the kingdom, discovers the wizards' presence, she boxes them with Arcadios in the Palace of Hades and sentences the wizards to death by the Hungry Wolf Knights execution unit.
37	April 17, 2013	978-4-06-384845-8	April 15, 2014	978-1-61262-433-4
309. "The Burning Earth" (燃える大地, Moeru Daichi); 310. "The Place Where We Are" (オレたちのいる国(ばしょ), Ore-tachi no Iru Basho); 311. "The Land of Until Tomorrow" (明日までの国, Ashita made no Kuni); 312. "Threesomes"; 313. "The King's Script" (王者のシナリオ, Ōja no Shinario); 314. "Erza vs. Kagura" (エルザ vs. カグラ, Eruza vs. Kagura); 315. "Rosemary" (ローズマリー, Rōzumarī); 316. "A Future Hurrying Towards Despair" (絶望へ加速する未来, Zetsubō e Kasoku suru Mirai); 317. "Frog" (カエル, Kaeru)
Darton confronts Hisui, deducing that she is behind the Eclipse Plan and sent Fairy Tail to the Palace of Hades to rescue Arcadios. Hisui reveals a new plan to save the country, having been forewarned by a time traveler from the future that 10,000 dragons are to ravage the kingdom on July 7. After defeating Hungry Wolf Knights, the trapped Fairy Tail wizards encounter the hooded girl, who reveals herself as a future version of Lucy who has used Eclipse to travel to the present. Meanwhile, Erza engages in a three-way battle with Minerva and Kagura. Kagura plans to take revenge on Jellal for her brother Simon's death, but Erza takes credit for his death and saves Kagura from being crushed by rubble. Kagura remembers being similarly rescued by Erza in her past and attempts to surrender, but is mercilessly attacked by Minerva, to Erza's fury. Meanwhile, Gajeel confronts Rogue, whose shadow comes to life and orders Rogue to kill Gajeel.
38	June 17, 2013	978-4-06-384876-2	May 13, 2014	978-1-61262-434-1
318. "Gajeel vs. Rogue" (ガジル vs. ローグ, Gajiru vs. Rōgu); 319. "White Knight" (白き騎士, Shiroki Kishi); 320. "Attacking Lightning" (激雷, Gekirai); 321. "Laxus vs. Jura" (ラクサス vs. ジュラ, Rakusasu vs. Jura); 322. "Gloria"; 323. "The Shadow: There and Back Again" (ゆきて帰りし影, Yukite Kaerishi Kage); 324. "One Who Would Close the Door" (扉を閉める者, Tobira o Shimeru Mono); 325. "Solidarity!!!!" (団結！！！！, Danketsu!!!!)
Gajeel is able to eat Rogue's shadow and defeat him while Erza defeats Minerva using her Second Origin. Jura Neekis easily defeats Olga Nanagia before being defeated in turn by Laxus. Sting remains Fairy Tail's last opponent, but he cannot bring himself to fight them and forfeits victory to Fairy Tail. Meanwhile, Lucy and the others fight against the army and the Hungry Wolf Knights. However, their battle is soon interrupted by a future incarnation of Rogue, who uses his shadows to defeat the army. Revealed as Hisui's advisor, Rogue says that Eclipse can be used as a weapon, the Eclipse Cannon, capable of defeating the 10,000 approaching dragons. He attempts to kill Lucy, predicting that she will interfere with the gate's opening, but her future self protects her from his attack and is killed. Natsu battles Rogue, vowing to protect the future and avenge Lucy's future self. Determined to save the kingdom, Hisui orders Eclipse to be opened. The participating guilds from the Grand Magic Games are informed by Fiore's king, Toma E. Fiore, about the invasion of the 10,000 dragons before Eclipse opens.
39	August 16, 2013	978-4-06-394908-7	June 4, 2014	978-1-61262-435-8
326. "Natsu vs. Rogue" (ナツ vs. ローグ, Natsu vs. Rōgu); 327. "Live On for Her" (あたしの分まで, Atashi no Bun made); 328. "Zodiac" (ゾディアック, Zodiakku); 329. "Seven Dragons" (SEVEN DRAGON); 330. "The Magic of Zirconis" (ジルコニスの魔法, Jirukonisu no Mahō); 331. "Natsu's Plan" (ナツの作戦, Natsu no Sakusen); 332. "Firebird" (ファイアバード, Faiabādo); 333. "Man & Man, Dragon & Dragon, Man & Dragon" (人と人、竜と竜、人と竜, Hito to Hito, Ryū to Ryū, Hito to Ryū); 334. "Sin and Sacrifice" (罪と犠牲, Tsumi to Gisei); 335. "Time of Life" (命の時間, Inochi no Jikan)
Lucy discovers that the Eclipse Cannon does not exist, and that Rogue's future self has sabotaged Eclipse to remain open for dragons from 400 years in the past to come through. However, only seven dragons emerge before Lucy and Yukino use the twelve spirits of the Zodiac to close Eclipse. Rogue's future self takes control of the dragons, revealing his plot to use them against Acnologia and become the new king of dragons. Natsu rallies the Dragon Slayers present, including a released Cobra at Jellal's request, to battle the dragons while he resumes his duel with Rogue. Meanwhile, Ultear considers killing the present-day Rogue to prevent him from being corrupted in the future. Soon thinking herself unworthy to live for having such thoughts, Ultear repentantly casts the Last Ages spell at the cost of her life with the intent of reversing time to before Eclipse is opened. Despite reversing time by one minute, her spell causes the battling wizards to foresee their opponents' next moves and save the lives of those killed within that span of time, including Gray.
40	October 17, 2013	978-4-06-394941-4	July 15, 2014	978-1-61262-417-4
336. "I'll Give Today All I've Got" (今日を全力で生きる為に, Kyō o Zenryoku de Ikiru Tameni); 337. "The Golden Grasslands" (黄金の草原, Ōgon no Sōgen); 338. "The Grand Ball Games" (大舞踊演舞, Daibuyōenbu); 339. "Drops of Time" (星霜の雫, Seisō no Shizuku); 340. "Delivery" (贈り物, Okurimono); 341. "The Morning of a New Adventure" (新たな冒険の朝, Aratana Bōken no Asa); 342. "Warrod Sequen" (ウォーロッド・シーケン, Wōroddo Shīken); 343. "Treasure Hunters" (トレジャーハンター, Torejā Hantā); 344. "Wizards vs. Hunters" (魔導士 vs. ハンター, Madōshi vs. Hantā)
Allying with the dragon Atlas Flame, Natsu defeats Future Rogue and destroys Eclipse, sending Rogue, the dragons, and Future Lucy's body to their respective time periods. The guilds celebrate in a lavish ballroom party, where Saber Tooth and Fairy Tail make amends. Meanwhile, Doranbalt has his fellow councilors' memories of the incident erased. Jellal and Merudy receive a letter from an old woman telling them of Ultear's sacrifice, unaware the woman is Ultear herself, aged by her Last Ages spell. Some time later, the Fairy Tail wizards return to Magnolia to find their old guildhall restored by the townspeople. Mavis retreats to find Zeref, who plans to kill humankind to prevent any more conflicts. The next day, Natsu and Gray receive a request from Warrod Sequen, one of the Ten Wizard Saints and Fairy Tail's founders, to save a village of giants called the Village of the Sun that has been completely frozen. The two and their guildmates arrive and are confronted by a trio of treasure hunters from the Sylph Labyrinth guild, who plan to steal the village's frozen deity, the Eternal Flame, using a vial of liquid Moon Drip. Reasoning they can use the Moon Drip to unfreeze the village, the wizards give chase. While searching for the flame by herself, Erza finds herself in the form of a child.
41	December 17, 2013	978-4-06-394982-7	August 12, 2014	978-1-61262-437-2
345. "Somebody's Voice" (誰かの声, Dareka no Koe); 346. "The Way of Devolution" (退化ノ法, Taika no Hō); 347. "The Great Charge of the Red, the Blue, and the Blondie" (赤・青・金髪 大激闘, Aka, Ao, Kinpatsu: Daigekitō); 348. "The Devil Returns" (悪魔回帰, Akuma Kaiki); 349. "The Demon Doriath" (悪魔のドリアーテ, Akuma no Doriāte); 350. "Gray vs. Doriath" (グレイ vs. ドリアーテ, Gurei vs. Doriāte); 351. "Eternal Flame" (永遠の炎, Eien no Honō); 352. "Voice of the Flame" (炎の声, Honō no Koe); 353. "Demon Exorcist" (悪魔祓い, Akuma Harai)
The liquid Moon Drip is inadvertently spilled during Fairy Tail and Sylph Labyrinth's fight, thawing out a small patch of grass. Hearing a familiar voice through the patch, Natsu follows its source. Lucy and Wendy defeat Sylph Labyrinth alongside Flare, who reveals herself as a villager and guides them to the flame. Meanwhile, Natsu is turned into a child by Doriath, a member of the dark guild Succubus Eye and a demon from the Book of Zeref, just as Minerva battles Erza once again. Gray also falls under his spell, but is able to outsmart Doriath to compensate for his weakened magic. Gray discovers Doriath's weakness is the ice around them, and channels its magic to break his spell before the demon is eaten by a large, winged monster. Gray lures the monster to the massive Eternal Flame, where Natsu traces the voice and regroups with Lucy, Wendy, and Flare. Using his new understanding of the magic ice, Gray unfreezes the weakened flame and Natsu reignites it, defeating the monster in the process. The wizards recognize the flame as Atlas Flame's spirit, who tells them that Silver—a Demon Slayer from the dark guild Tartaros—is responsible for freezing the village, and warns them of E.N.D., a powerful demon Igneel previously failed to kill. Using the last of his strength, Atlas Flame unfreezes the village and disappears.
42	March 17, 2014	978-4-06-395009-0	September 30, 2014	978-1-61262-561-4
354. "Kyôka" (キョウカ); 355. "Song of the Fairies"; 356. "Tartaros Arc Prologue" (冥府の門(タルタロス)編【序章】, Tarutarosu-hen (Joshō)); 357. "The Nine Demon Gates" (九鬼門, Kyūkimon); 358. "The Devil Particles" (魔障粒子, Mashō Ryūshi); 359. "Fairies vs. the Underworld" (妖精 対 冥府, Yōsei tai Meifu); 360. "The White Inheritance" (白き遺産, Shiroki Isan); 361. "Two Bombs" (二つの爆弾, Futatsu no Bakudan)
The Fairy Tail wizards celebrate their success in saving the village and Flare's reunion with the giants while contemplating Atlas Flame's cryptic warnings. Meanwhile, Minerva finds the Succubus Eye wizards obliterated by Kyôka, a member of Tartaros, who captures her. As the Magic Council discusses Tartaros' activities, the demon Jackal bombs their headquarters, killing the councilors. As one of the survivors of the bombing, Doranbalt extracts information on Tartaros from Cobra, who reveals that the dark guild is made up of Zeref's demons, with E.N.D. serving as their master. Retired councilor Yajima is similarly attacked by Tempester, who seriously injures Laxus and the Raijin Tribe with his wind powers as they defend Yajima. Desperate to discover Tartaros' plot and avenge their guildmates, Fairy Tail decides to track down the other retired councilors targeted by Tartaros. Natsu and his friends are assigned to protect councilor Michello, who is attacked by Jackal.
43	May 16, 2014	978-4-06-395077-9	October 28, 2014	978-1-61262-562-1
362. "Natsu vs. Jackal" (ナツ vs. ジャッカル, Natsu vs. Jakkaru); 363. "Stories That Demons Read" (悪魔の詠む物語, Akuma no Yomu Monogatari); 364. "Tartaros Arc, Part 1: Immorality and Sinners" (冥府の門(タルタロス)編【一章：背徳と罪人】, Tarutarosu-hen (Isshō: Haitoku to Zainin)); 365. "Fairy in the Jail"; 366. "1,000 Souls" (魂1000個, Tamashii Issen-ko); 367. "Jellal vs. Oración Seis" (ジェラール vs. 六魔将軍(オラシオンセイス), Jerāru vs. Orashion Seisu); 368. "The Third Ward" (3つ目の封印, Mittsume no Fūin); 369. "Where Prayers Go" (祈りが届く場所, Inori ga Todoku Basho)
Natsu defeats Jackal, who kills himself in a failed suicide attack. Michello tells the guild that Tartaros is killing councillors who are magically linked to Face, a pulse bomb designed to neutralize magic across Fiore. To locate Face, Erza and Mirajane visit ex-chairman Crawford Theme, who reveals his allegiance with Tartaros and captures them both. Natsu discovers Crawford's treachery and follows his scent to Tartaros' flying headquarters, Cube, but is also captured. Crawford locates Jellal, the final councillor needed to unseal Face, who battles the recently freed Oración Seis. Crawford acquires Jellal's seal before being killed by Kyôka, activating Face. Meanwhile, Elfman and Lisanna encounter the demon Seilah, who uses her power over others' bodies to threaten Lisanna's life and manipulate Elfman into planting a bomb in Fairy Tail's guildhall.
44	July 17, 2014	978-4-06-395124-0	November 25, 2014	978-1-61262-563-8
370. "Devil Reincarnation" (悪魔転生, Akuma Tensei); 371. "Tartaros Arc, Part 2: Song of the Sky Dragon" (冥府の門(タルタロス)編【二章：天竜の歌】, Tarutarosu-hen (Nishō: Tenryū no Uta)); 372. "Breakthrough" (突破口, Toppakō); 373. "To Kill or Let Live" (生かすか殺すか, Ikasu ka Korosu ka); 374. "Revolution" (レボリューション, Reboryūshon); 375. "Herculean Madness" (怪力乱神, Kairyoku Ranshin); 376. "Wendy vs. Ezel" (ウェンディ vs. エゼル, Wendi vs. Ezeru); 377. "The Sky Dragon's Rage" (天竜の逆鱗, Tenryū no Gekirin); 378. "Friends Forever" (ずっと友達で, Zutto Tomodachi de)
Using a deck of magic cards, Cana seals her guildmates and herself to escape the guildhall's destruction. Happy, Carla, and Panther Lily bring the guild to the overhead Cube, where the wizards begin their assault. Natsu and Lisanna escape and free Erza, who battles Kyôka and breaks through the Cube, giving her guild access inside. Lucy and Wendy discover Face's location and regroup with Natsu, but are impeded by Franmalth, a demon imbued with Hades's soul and magic. Wendy and Carla flee and arrive at Face, only to be attacked by the demon Ezel. Absorbing the residual magic energy around Face, Wendy achieves Dragon Force and defeats Ezel, destroying Face in the process. Unable to stop Face's countdown, however, Carla programs Face to self-destruct before she and Wendy are saved at the last second by Doranbalt.
45	September 17, 2014	978-4-06-395186-8	December 30, 2014	978-1-61262-564-5
379. "Tartaros Arc, Part 3: Underworld King" (冥府の門(タルタロス)編【三章：冥王】, Tarutarosu-hen (Sanshō: Meiō)); 380. "Hell's Core" (ヘルズ・コア, Heruzu Koa); 381. "The House Where Demons Dwell" (悪魔の住む家, Akuma no Sumu Ie); 382. "Alegria" (アレグリア, Areguria); 383. "Wave Rider Lucy" (波乗りルーシィ, Naminori Rūshii); 384. "Attack of the Celestials" (星々の一撃, Hoshiboshi no Ichigeki); 385. "The Celestial King vs. the Underworld King" (星霊王 vs. 冥王, Seireiō vs. Meiō); 386. "Galaxia Blade" (ギャラクシア ブレイド, Gyarakushia Bureido)
Natsu defeats Franmalth and releases Hades' soul, who forewarns that Tartaros' plans for Face have not ended, and instructs Makarov to release Lumen Histoire. While battling Seilah, Mirajane destroys the demons' laboratory enabling them to resurrect themselves. Seilah attempts to kill Mirajane in anger for Elfman's failure to destroy the guild, but Mirajane absorbs Seilah's powers and summons Elfman to defeat her. Afterward, Cube is reconfigured into the flying monster Pluto's Grim by Mard Geer, the keeper of the book where E.N.D. is sealed, absorbing the wizards into the monster's body and laying waste to Magnolia. Lucy escapes Mard Geer's curse and, in her struggle against the resurrected Jackal, sacrifices her spirit Aquarius' key to summon the Celestial Spirit King and cut down Pluto's Grim. The spirit king lifts the curse on Fairy Tail before going his separate ways, allowing Natsu, Gray, Gajeel, and Juvia to save Lucy from the remaining demons.
