= List of Black Butler chapters =

The cover of the first tankōbon released in Japan by Square Enix on February 27, 2007, in Japan featuring Sebastian Michaelis

The chapters of the manga series Black Butler are written and illustrated by Japanese mangaka Yana Toboso and have been serialized in Square Enix's Monthly GFantasy since its premiere in October 2006. The series follows Sebastian Michaelis, a demonic butler who is obligated to serve Ciel Phantomhive, the thirteen-year-old head of the Phantomhive noble family, due to a contract he made with Ciel.

Since its premiere, over two hundred chapters have been released in Japan. On July 11, 2008, Gakken's Animedia magazine confirmed the manga was going to be adapted into an anime series, directed by Toshiya Shinohara and produced by A-1 Pictures, which began airing in October 2008 and ended its run in March 2009.

The individual chapters are published in tankōbon by Square Enix under their Gangan Comics imprint. The first volume was released on February 27, 2007, and, as of September 26, 2026, thirty-six volumes have been released. In July 2009, Yen Press licensed the series for an English language release and began to serialize the manga in its Yen Plus' August 2009 issue for the magazine's first anniversary. They released the first volume in January 2010. Every chapter follows a naming scheme: The Butler (その執事, Sono Shitsuji) followed by a comma and a word or phrase composed of two kanji.

== Volume list ==
No.	Original release date	Original ISBN	English release date	English ISBN
1	February 27, 2007	978-4-7575-1963-3	January 26, 2010	978-0-316-08084-2
001. "In the morning: The Butler, Skilled" (その執事、有能, "Sono Shitsuji, Yūnō"); 002. "In the afternoon: The Butler, Very Skilled" (その執事、万能, "Sono Shitsuji, Bannō"); 003. "At night: The Butler, Omnipotent" (その執事、最強, "Sono Shitsuji, Saikyō"); 004. "At midnight: The Butler, Most Evil" (その執事、最凶, "Sono Shitsuji, Sai Kyō")
In a manor house outside of Victorian London, Sebastian Michaelis, butler to twelve-year-old Ciel Phantomhive, prepares the household for a special guest named Clause. However, Baldroy the chef, Mey-Rin the maid, and Finnian the gardener, mess up their tasks. Through quick thinking, and a bit of inspiration from Tanaka the house steward, Sebastian is able to create a flawless evening. Days later, Ciel is kidnapped by drug dealer Azzurro Vanel of the Fener family. When Ciel refuses to reveal the location of the drugs Clause delivered to Ciel, Vanel orders Ciel's servants killed. Sebastian kills Vanel's large force by himself, using nothing but silverware, and returns home with Ciel, slightly late for dinner.
2	July 27, 2007	978-4-7575-2063-9	May 18, 2010	978-0-316-08425-3
005. "In the morning: The Butler, Busy" (その執事、多忙, "Sono Shitsuji, Sabō"); 006. "At noon: The Butler, Activated" (その執事、始動, "Sono Shitsuji, Shidō"); 007. "In the afternoon: The Butler, Capricious" (その執事、粋狂, "Sono Shitsuji, Suikyō"); 008. "At night: The Butler, Commendable" (その執事、殊勝, "Sono Shitsuji, Shushō"); 009. "At midnight: The Butler, Encounters" (その執事、邂逅, "Sono Shitsuji, Kaikō")
A group of orphans are visiting the manor soon. As Sebastian prepares chocolate for the guests, he is constantly interrupted by the servants. Ciel is visited by his aunt, Doctor Angelina "Madame Red" Dalles, her butler Grell Sutcliff, and Lau. They discuss the recent serial murders of prostitutes, called the Jack the Ripper case. To investigate, they visit Undertaker, a funeral director, and learn the victims' wombs were removed. They speculate the perpetrator is an anatomical expert. The Viscount of Druitt becomes the prime suspect. Ciel disguises himself as Madame Red's niece and investigates during the Viscount's party. He is taken to a gas-filled room. When Ciel awakens, he is being auctioned off. Sebastian rescues the boy and the Viscount is arrested. However, another murder has taken place. Grell and Madame Red admit to the murders as Grell transforms into his shinigami form and engages Sebastian in battle.
3	December 18, 2007	978-4-7575-2192-6	October 26, 2010	978-0-316-08426-0
010. "In the morning: The Butler, Reflective" (その執事、回想, "Sono Shitsuji, Kaisō"); 011. "At noon: The Butler, Retrospective" (その執事、追想, "Sono Shitsuji, Tsuisō"); 012. "In the afternoon: The Butler, Retaliatory" (その執事、反攻, "Sono Shitsuji, Hankō"); 013. "At night: The Butler, Mourning" (その執事、葬送, "Sono Shitsuji, Sōsō"); 014. "At midnight: The Butler, On the Hunt" (その執事、狩猟, "Sono Shitsuji, Shuryō")
Grell's chainsaw-like scythe cuts through anything, quickly overpowering Sebastian as Madame Red attacks Ciel. Grell kills her when she refuses to kill Ciel. Memories of her life--her sister and her sister's husband the Earl of Phantomhive are played out, an effect of the scythe. Despite her love for the Earl Phantomhive, Madame Red marries Baron Dalles and becomes pregnant with his child. Her happiness is destroyed when her husband and unborn baby are lost in an accident. When she is released from the hospital, she finds the Phantomhive manor burning. Madame Red is envious of her sister, who died with someone she loves while Madame Red is alone. Madame Red returns to work and is asked to perform abortions on prostitutes. Infuriated because they have what was taken away from her, she kills them. Grell, who witnesses these killings, joins her. The two become Jack the Ripper. Sebastian attacks Grell and tangles Grell's chainsaw with his tailcoat. Sebastian tries to kill Grell with the scythe, but the shinigami William Spears stops Sebastian. William apologizes for Grell's actions as he has killed people who are not on the to-die list and drags Grell away for punishment. After Madame Red's funeral, Ciel is warned against sinking into darkness. Ciel's aunt and fiancée, respectively Marchioness Frances Middleford and her daughter Elizabeth, visit the estate. Ciel and the Marchioness engage in a hunting competition. When the group is attacked by a bear, Ciel protects Elizabeth and Sebastian kills the bear, although it appears to be the Marchioness' handiwork. The Middlefords and the servants wish Ciel a happy birthday, the true purpose of the visit.
4	May 27, 2008	978-4-7575-2291-6	January 25, 2011	978-0-316-08428-4
015. "In the morning: The Butler, Freeloading" (その執事、居候, "Sono Shitsuji, Isōrō"); 016. "At noon: The Butler, Foreign" (その執事、異邦, "Sono Shitsuji, Ihō"); 017. "In the afternoon: The Butler, Competitive" (その執事、拮抗, "Sono Shitsuji, Kikkō"); 018. "At night: The Butler, Shadowing" (その執事、尾行, "Sono Shitsuji, Bikō"); 019. "At midnight: The Butler, Superhuman" (その執事、異能, "Sono Shitsuji, Inō")
Ciel, Sebastian, and Lau investigate a case where British citizens returning from India are attacked, stripped, and hung upside-down outside Indian pubs in London. Attached to each victim is a letter insulting the English. The group is attacked by poor Indian men during their investigation. They are helped by the Indian Prince Soma and his butler Agni. They are searching for Soma's servant Mina, who was taken away by a British man. Although Agni is human, he is on par with Sebastian's fighting skills. Agni declines the compliments, saying that he once had power and wealth, which he abused until he was to be hanged for his crimes. He was saved by Soma, who gave him a new life and name, and, as a result, Agni views Soma as a god. Agni leaves the manor at night. The group, including Soma, follows Agni to Lord West's home. When he hears Mina mentioned, Soma quickly reveals the group's presence. Agni refuses to obey Soma's orders, but begins to act on West's order to beat Soma. A disguised Sebastian saves Soma and the group escapes to the manor. Soma becomes angry he has been betrayed. Sebastian tells him he is spoiled and never truly owned anything. Ciel admits he would have become the same if his parents had not murdered and he was sacrificed to summon the demon later called Sebastian. The group speculates West aims to win the upcoming curry competition, and subsequently, a Royal Warrant. Through the attacks, West terrorized other competitors. Ciel decides he will win the competition and the Warrant. However, Soma insists Agni, who is known for his curry, cannot be beaten.
5	September 18, 2008	978-4-7575-2378-4	April 26, 2011	978-0-316-08429-1
020. "In the morning: The Butler, Cogitating" (その執事、着想, "Sono Shitsuji, Chakusō"); 021. "In the afternoon: The Butler, Competitive" (その執事、競争, "Sono Shitsuji, Kyōsō"); 022. "At night: The Butler, Victorious" (その執事、純情, "Sono Shitsuji, Junjō"); 023. "At midnight: The Butler, Agitated" (その執事、交流, "Sono Shitsuji, Kōryū")
Soma repeatedly rejects Sebastian's curry, even when the curry tastes and smells like Agni's. Sebastian realizes that chocolate completes the curry and gives it an English touch. This curry matches Agni's. Ciel comments that replicating the curry is not enough to win, but Sebastian has a plan that will win the Warrant. At the competition, Agni and Sebastian impress the audience. However, Soma and Agni realize that Sebastian will lose because he cannot make a perfect naan and he is cooking the curry at too high a temperature. Agni easily wins the judges' approval during the judging with his seven varieties of curry. The judges immediately reject Sebastian's curry because it appears to be a doughnut. When the judges learn the curry is inside the doughnut and taste it, they are evenly split over which curry is superior and proclaim a tie. However, Queen Victoria arrives to the competition and awards Sebastian first prize because his curry accounts for the children. As West copes with his loss, he is comforted by Mina, whom Soma tries to take back to India. He learns Mina wants to be West's rich wife rather than Soma's cook and Agni is hiding this truth from him. Soma realizes he caused all of his grief and apologizes for all the trouble he gives Agni. Meanwhile, Lau and Ranmao kill West and Mina in an alleyway. When Commissioner Randall and Fred Abberline visit Phantomhive manor, Agni tries to take the blame for the recent crimes only to have Sebastian stop him.
6	January 27, 2009	978-4-7575-2485-9	July 19, 2011	978-0-316-08430-7
024. "In the morning: The Butler, Onstage" (その執事、壇上, "Sono Shitsuji, Sanjō"); 025. "In the afternoon: The Butler, Treated" (その執事、治療, "Sono Shitsuji, Chiryō"); 026. "At night: The Butler, A Colleague" (その執事、同僚, "Sono Shitsuji, Dōryō"); 027. "At midnight: The Butler, Performs" (その執事、興行, "Sono Shitsuji, Kōgyō")
Ciel and Sebastian investigate the connection between the disappearances of children and Noah's Ark Circus. When Sebastian is bitten by a tiger during one of the circus' performances, Sebastian is able to search for the children. He finds that the circus performers have prosthetic limbs. While examining the prosthetic Beast the animal tamer has, she accuses him of being rude. She and another performer attack him, but Sebastian evades the attacks. This impresses Joker the ringleader into recruiting Sebastian. Sebastian accepts and Ciel takes the entrance test the next morning. Although Ciel cannot perform the circus acts, Sebastian helps him pass from the sidelines. The two are welcomed into the troupe. When Joker leaves them, Sebastian tells Ciel that there is no sign of the children and suggests they investigate the snake-protected tents of the main cast. Afterward, they find William Spears has also joined. Sebastian notes that if a shinigami is at this circus, then there is something wrong about it. William states his division is understaffed and there is business to attend to. The three agree not to interfere with each other. During a performance, Sebastian and Ciel are able to investigate the tents. At the last minute, Sebastian must stand-in for a performer. Ciel searches the tents and finds photographs of a philanthropist whose hallmark is on Beast's prosthetic. He also finds a letter mentioning Ciel. The performers return before he can investigate further.
7	June 27, 2009	978-4-7575-2601-3	October 25, 2011	978-0-316-18963-7
028. "In the morning: The Butler, Parleying" (その執事、交渉, "Sono Shitsuji, Kōshō"); 029. "At noon: The Butler, Scandalous" (その執事、醜行, "Sono Shitsuji, Shūkō"); 030. "In the afternoon: The Butler, Nurturing" (その執事、撫養, "Sono Shitsuji, Buyō"); 031. "At night: The Butler, A Spectator" (その執事、歓望, "Sono Shitsuji, Kanbō"); 032. "At midnight: The Butler, Mocking" (その執事、嘲笑, "Sono Shitsuji, Chōshō")
The performers learn that Ciel was in their tents and Joker leaves to consult Father. Ciel orders Sebastian to learn the name of hallmark's owner. Sebastian seduces Beast into revealing the name Baron Kelvin. Sebastian and Ciel leave for the London manor in the morning to prepare for further investigation. However, Soma and Agni recognize Ciel is sick and prevent him from investigating. Meanwhile, the performers learn that Sebastian, Ciel, and William have disappeared and decide to carry out Father's orders without Joker. Joker reports that Ciel has infiltrated the circus. Despite this, Kelvin becomes excited. Ciel and Sebastian are welcomed into Kelvin's mansion for dinner. For entertainment, Kelvin has untrained children perform circus tricks, resulting in their gruesome deaths. Sebastian finds a kidnapped child among the performers and puts a stop to the performance. Ciel learns Kelvin has recreated the day Ciel was used as a sacrifice. Disgusted with the Baron, Ciel shoots him. Joker attempts to save Kelvin, but Sebastian incapacitates him. Joker begs Ciel to let Kelvin live because he saved the Noah's Ark Circus performers from the streets. Because Joker lives by the same code Ciel lives by, Ciel lets him live. Joker tells Ciel that the other performers are searching for Ciel and will kill his servants and Elizabeth, but Ciel is not worried. At Ciel's manor, the performers attack.
8	November 27, 2009	978-4-7575-2736-2	January 24, 2012	978-0-316-18965-1
033. "In the morning: The Butler, Confident" (その執事、信望, "Sono Shitsuji, Shinbō"); 034. "At noon: The Butler, Composed" (その執事、従容, "Sono Shitsuji, Shōyō"); 035. "In the afternoon: The Butler, Executor" (その執事、遂行, "Sono Shitsuji, Suikō"); 036. "At night: The Butler, In Attendance" (その執事、随行, "Sono Shitsuji, Zuikō"); 037. "At midnight: The Butler, Brand New" (その執事、新調, "Sono Shitsuji, Shinchou")
Finnian, Mey-Rin, Baldroy, and Tanaka defeat the circus performers. Meanwhile, the doctor who examined Sebastian when bitten by a tiger reveals to Ciel and Sebastian that the artificial limbs he made for the performers were actually made from "certain materials": the bones of the kidnapped children. When the doctor kills a child, Ciel has a flashback of when he was nearly sacrificed and has a panic attack. Sebastian reminds him that he is now "out of the cage", and Ciel orders him to kill the doctor and Baron Kelvin. Sebastian does so, and hesitates when Ciel commands him to burn down the manor, as the kidnapped children are still imprisoned inside, but obeys. William looks at Joker's Cinematic Record on the days when Baron Kelvin had taken in him and his friends, and Ronald Knox appears; then they both prepare to collect the souls. Doll arrives at the burning manor, and Sebastian informs her that Joker and the other two were dead. Realizing that "Smile" was actually Ciel Phantomhive and that everything had been a lie, Doll breaks down and vows that she will never forgive Ciel, then attempts to kill him. Sebastian is seen walking away from the manor with Ciel, and it is implied that he killed Doll. The Undertaker is then seen watching the manor burn, as well as two men in white. Snake later on goes out to find the other performers, while Ciel and Sebastian go to the workhouse where Joker had said that several other adoptees were. But when they arrive at the workhouse no one is there, and Ciel finds it darkly amusing that people would try to protect something nonexistent.
9	June 18, 2010	978-4-7575-2891-8	April 24, 2012	978-0-316-18967-5
038. "In the morning: The Butler, Wretched" (その執事、悲愴, "Sono Shitsuji, Hisō"); 039. "At noon: The Butler, Startled" (その執事、咆驚, "Sono Shitsuji, Houkyou"); 040. "In the afternoon: The Butler, Confining" (その執事、収容, "Sono Shitsuji, Shūyō"); 041. "At night: The Butler, Deceased" (その執事、死亡, "Sono Shitsuji, Shibō"); 042. "At midnight: The Butler, Substituted" (その執事、代行, "Sono Shitsuji, Daikō")
Ciel receives a request from the Queen to host a banquet to entertain a German relative from her who is visiting England, Georg von Siemens. The story is told from another guest's perspective, a writer named Arthur, who meets the other invited ones including Lau accompanied by Ran-Mao, one of the Queen's butlers, Earl Charles Grey, the president of a diamond company, Karl Woodley, Patrick Phelps from a shipbuilding company, and theatrical producer Grimsby Keane accompanied by his girlfriend, the opera singer Irene Diaz. During the dinner, an intoxicated Siemens falls asleep and is sent to his room. Sebastian later finds Siemens dead, and the guests conclude that the murderer is one of them. Since Ciel is the only person without an alibi, he is suspected of killing Siemens and has Arthur sleeping alongside him with scorting cuffs as insurance. After the night, the servants find Sebastian dead and not even Ciel's orders cause him to move. Ciel places Tanaka as Sebastian's replacement and as the guests try to have breakfast, they go Phelps' room where he is found dead.
10	September 27, 2010	978-4-7575-3012-6	July 24, 2012	978-0-316-18988-0
043. "The Butler, Stalwart" (その執事、屈強, "Sono Shitsuji, Kukkyō"); 044. "The Butler, Wailing" (その執事、哀号, "Sono Shitsuji, Aigō"); 045. "The Butler, Disturbed" (その執事、移動, "Sono Shitsuji, Idō"); 046. "The Butler, Dispensable" (その執事、不要, "Sono Shitsuji, Fuyō"); 047. "The Butler, Contemplative" (その執事、熟考, "Sono Shitsuji, Jukkō")
Based on the alibis, Arthur comes to the conclusion that there are multiple culprits who could work together. Despite new arguments between the guests, Ciel agrees to leave the investigation in Ciel's hands. A man known as Father Jeremy Rathbone comes to the mansion as invited by Sebastian in hopes of finding the culprit. Father Jeremy orders to investigate the three corpses and stages a trap to find the culprit. Jeremy captures the culprit that tries to kill which is revealed to be a snake that accidentally killed Phelps because he was sleeping in Ciel's room. Jeremy then concludes that Siemens was actually killed after they found his body, having been temporarily dead thanks to a poison. Upon analyzing who could have sent the snake, Woodley is deemed as the only culprit because of possible reason to attempt to murder Ciel and is arrested by Earl Grey. Feeling disturbed by how the case was closed, Arthur confronts Ciel and reveals that Father Jeremy was actually Sebastian in disguise.
11	February 26, 2011	978-4-7575-3151-2	October 30, 2012	978-0-316-22533-5
048. "The Butler, Solving" (その執事、解決, "Sono Shitsuji, Kaiketsu"); 049. "The Butler, Eccentric" (その執事、奇矯, "Sono Shitsuji, Kikyō"); 050. "The Butler, Laid to Rest" (その執事、埋葬, "Sono Shitsuji, Maisō"); 051. "The Butler, Setting Sail" (その執事、出港, "Sono Shitsuji, Shukkō"); 052. "The Butler, At the Helm" (その執事、運航, "Sono Shitsuji, Unkō")
Ciel and Sebastian decide to explain to Arthur the truth behind the case, having anticipated most of the events that occurred the previous nights. Ciel had ordered Sebastian to act when he investigated the mystery behind Siemens' fake death. Sebastian was then attacked by the real culprit, Earl Grey, who was ordered by Queen Victoria to murder Siemens to stop the growth of Germany's military power he was causing, and Sebastian faked his death. While the guests were searching for the culprit, Sebastian made preparations to disguise as Father Jeremy and have a solid alibi by quickly change his clothes when investigating his corpses and disguising Phelps' corpse as him when the manor house's people had to check Sebastian's body. In order to avoid Arthur telling the truth, Sebastian shows his true demon form, terrorizing him. After Arthur escapes, Sebastian shows Ciel the one who accidentally murdered Phelps was Snake from Noah's Ark Circus, who suspects Ciel of having something to do with the disappearance of his friends. However, after Ciel tricks him into believing his friends from Noah's Ark Circus are still alive, Snake becomes their footman as he (Ciel) said the quickest way to see his friends again is by working for him because he is searching for them and is sure they are innocent from the child kidnappings. Ciel is later informed by Lau about a cult known as the Aurora Society that appears to revive the dead. Accompanied by Sebastian and Snake, Ciel goes to the luxury ship Campania where a meeting of the group is to be held. There they find Elizabeth's family who is taking the trip as well as Aurora Society's members, the Viscount of Druitt, and the founder Rian Stoker who causes the awakening of a berserker zombie.
12	July 27, 2011	978-4-7575-3307-3	January 22, 2013	978-0-316-22534-2
053. "The Butler, In the Fray" (その執事、乱闘, "Sono Shitsuji, Rantō"); 054. "The Butler, Peerless" (その執事、無双, "Sono Shitsuji, Musō"); 055. "The Butler, In Vain" (その執事、徒労, "Sono Shitsuji, Torō"); 056. "The Butler, Guessing" (その執事、見当, "Sono Shitsuji, Kentō"); 057. "The Butler, Struggling" (その執事、苦闘, "Sono Shitsuji, Kutō")
The zombie is defeated by the Grim Reaper Ronald Knox who has been dispatched by his group to stop the souls manipulated by the Aurora Society. While Ronald tries to kill Sebastian knowing his true nature, Ciel goes to catch Rian Stroker. Alongside Elizabeth and Snake, Ciel tries to escape from a zombie outbreak, and the three are saved by Sebastian as Ronald leaves him. Ciel finds Rian who reveals that the zombie can be rendered inactive by using a device left in his room and that a company known as Osiris wants to the zombies to be taken to America via the ship. However, with the captain killed during the outbreak, the ship crashes with an iceberg and it starts flooding. Sebastian is once again attacked by Ronald as well as Grell. As Ciel is unable to protect Elizabeth from the zombies, Elizabeth herself starts defeating the creatures revealing she is a trained knight.
13	December 27, 2011	978-4-7575-3460-5	April 23, 2013	978-0-316-24429-9
058. "The Butler, Knifehand" (その執事、手刀, "Sono Shitsuji, Yutō"); 059. "The Butler, Compromising" (その執事、妥協, "Sono Shitsuji, Dakyō"); 060. "The Butler, Shaken" (その執事、動揺, "Sono Shitsuji, Dōyō"); 061. "The Butler, Born" (その執事、誕生, "Sono Shitsuji, Tanjō"); 062. "The Butler, Maturing" (その執事、成長, "Sono Shitsuji, Seichō")
As Sebastian stops Elizabeth, the Grim Reapers leave. Ciel and Sebastian decide to stay in the sinking ship as an unconscious Elizabeth, her family and Snake leave on boats along with the other passengers. Ciel, Sebastian and the Grim Reapers then find the Viscount of Druitt who is in control of the machine able to stop the zombies, but Undertaker, revealed as a former Grim Reaper, comes to his defense. Revealed as the mastermind behind the control from the dead, the Undertaker confronts the Grim Reapers and Sebastian. Undertaker easily overwhelms his opponents and when impaling Sebastian with scythe, all of the memories regarding how he became a butler are shown. When Ciel was in a cult ritual, his hatred summoned Sebastian and made a contract with him so that he will kill his kidnappers and stay by his side to gain power. From there on, Sebastian rebuilds the Phanthomhive's burned mansion and tries to work as a human for Ciel and avoid using his demonic powers.
14	May 26, 2012	978-4-7575-3611-1	July 23, 2013	978-0-316-24430-5
063. "The Butler, In Training" (その執事、修行, "Sono Shitsuji, Shugyō"); 064. "The Butler, Gravely Wounded" (その執事、傷重, "Sono Shitsuji, Jūshō"); 065. "The Butler, Fighting Valiantly" (その執事、敢闘, "Sono Shitsuji, Kantō"); 066. "The Butler, Frenzied" (その執事、狂騒, "Sono Shitsuji, Kyōsō"); 067. "The Butler, At School" (その執事、通学, "Sono Shitsuji, Tōkō")
After remembering how Ciel became an earl but still decided to seek revenge for his parents' deaths, Sebastian's memories end. Undertaker tries to finish Sebastian, but the ship starts sinking and the two Grim Reapers are rescued by William Spears, while Rian Stoker dies. Undertaker splits the ship in half freeing the zombies and is not seen again. Meanwhile, Sebastian takes Ciel to a boat and has to finish the zombies able to move underwater. After returning to England, Ciel and his friends celebrate Easter and the two butlers from Queen Victoria leave him an assignment to do. For this Ciel and Sebastian infiltrate the British school Weston College to search for the Queen's relative Derrick who has not been seen again alongside other students living in the same establishment.
15	October 27, 2012	978-4-7575-3766-8	October 29, 2013	978-0-316-25419-9
068. "The Butler, Tidying Up" (その執事、清掃, "Sono Shitsuji, Seisō"); 069. "The Butler, In Disguise" (その執事、変装, "Sono Shitsuji, Hensō"); 070. "The Butler, Guiding" (その執事、誘導, "Sono Shitsuji, Yuudō"); 071. "The Butler, Plotting" (その執事、策謀, "Sono Shitsuji, Sakubō"); 072. "The Butler, Lauding" (その執事、嘆賞, "Sono Shitsuji, Tanshō")
Ciel investigates and concludes the principal of the school might have a clue on Derrick's whereabouts. However, the principal only meets with the school's prefects forcing Ciel to win their favor. His attempts are sabotaged by Maurice Cole, a student jealous of Ciel's rising popularity. In retaliation, Ciel exposes Maurice's true personality and proves his innocence while winning the prefect's opinions at the same time. When Ciel brings up Derrick's name in a conversation, the prefects are shocked.
16	March 27, 2013	978-4-7575-3928-0	January 21, 2014	978-0-316-36902-2
073. "The Butler, Colluding" (その執事、談合, "Sono Shitsuji, Dangō"); 074. "The Butler, Gaining Attendance" (その執事、入場, "Sono Shitsuji, Nyūjō"); 075. "The Butler, Confabulating" (その執事、談笑, "Sono Shitsuji, Danshō"); 076. "The Butler, Scheming" (その執事、策動, "Sono Shitsuji, Sakudō"); 077. "The Butler, Giving a Concert" (その執事、演奏, "Sono Shitsuji, Ensō")
The prefects quickly cover up their shock and reveal Derrick changed dorms per the principal's orders. Ciel and Sebastian's investigation reveals other students changed dorms at the same time as Derrick and have all disappeared. An upcoming cricket tournament presents Ciel a chance to meet with the principal as the most impressionable player gets to have tea with him. Ciel's team wins the first match after Sebastian poisons the other team. For the second match, Ciel's strategy gives them the advantage. When the principal appears in the crowd, Sebastian chases after him.
17	August 27, 2013	978-4-7575-4053-8	July 22, 2014	978-0-316-37670-9
078. "The Butler, Giving Chase" (その執事、追走, "Sono Shitsuji, Tsuisō"); 079. "The Butler, Final Match" (その執事、決勝, "Sono Shitsuji, Kesshō"); 080. "The Butler, Bowling Well" (その執事、好投, "Sono Shitsuji, Kōtō"); 081. "The Butler, Under Lock and Key" (その執事、優勝, "Sono Shitsuji, Yushō"); 082. "The Butler, Having a Laugh" (その執事、朗笑, "Sono Shitsuji, Rōshō")
Following the outcome of the annual cricket tourney, Ciel earns an invitation to the Midnight Tea Party, where he will meet the principal. There, he confronts the principal with the disappearance of Derrick, who then appears and attacks Greenhill. Derrick turns out to be a zombie, killed by the prefects and turned into a zombie through the Aurora Society, which the Viscount of Druitt, Redmond's uncle, is affiliated with. The principal is revealed to be the Undertaker.
18	January 18, 2014	978-4-7575-4199-3	October 28, 2014	978-0-316-33622-2
083. "The Butler, Giving Assent" (その執事、追走, "Sono Shitsuji, Sandō"); 084. "The Butler, Speculating" (その執事、決勝, "Sono Shitsuji, Sōzō"); 085. "The Butler, Taking Off" (その執事、好投, "Sono Shitsuji, Kassō"); 086. "The Butler, On Board" (その執事、優勝, "Sono Shitsuji, Shajō"); 087. "The Butler, Making Enquiries" (その執事、朗笑, "Sono Shitsuji, Tanbō")
In a flashback, the four prefects receive a poem in their complaints box, and after deciphering it, see Derrick and his friends bullying students. The vice principal is revealed to be in league with Derrick. Greenhill kills Derrick, and the other prefects agree to cover it up to preserve the tradition of Weston College. In the present, zombies, including the vice principal and Derrick's friends, attack the guests of the tea party. Ciel reports his findings to the Queen, and the prefects are then expelled from the school as punishment. Queen Victoria asks Ciel to investigate deaths, rumored to be caused by witches and werewolves, in Germany. When they enter the cursed forest related to the deaths, they find a village and meet the head, a young girl.
19	June 27, 2014	978-4-7575-4344-7	January 20, 2015	978-0-316-25940-8
088. "The Butler, Assisting" (その執事、追走, "Sono Shitsuji, Jochō"); 089. "The Butler, Sounding the Alarm" (その執事、決勝, "Sono Shitsuji, Keishō"); 090. "The Butler, On Loan" (その執事、出向, "Sono Shitsuji, Shukkō"); 091. "The Butler, Switched" (その執事、変更, "Sono Shitsuji, Henkō"); 092. "The Butler, In Service" (その執事、奉公, "Sono Shitsuji, Houkō")
The head, Sullivan, invites Ciel and his entourage to stay overnight in the village. Ciel and Sebastian enter the forest and are cursed, but Sullivan purifies them. However, Ciel is bedridden and shocked, only allowing Finnian to approach him. A werewolf enters through a window, and Sullivan decides to hold the Emerald Witch service.
20	December 27, 2014	978-4-7575-4523-6	July 21, 2015	978-0-316-30501-3
093. "The Butler, Descending" (その執事、下降, "Sono Shitsuji, Kakō"); 094. "The Butler, Exasperated" (その執事、激昂, "Sono Shitsuji, Gekikō"); 095. "The Butler, Dismayed" (その執事、失望, "Sono Shitsuji, Shitsubō"); 096. "The Butler, Encouraging" (その執事、勧奨, "Sono Shitsuji, Kanshō"); 097. "The Butler, Fascinated" (その執事、感興, "Sono Shitsuji, Kankyō"); 098. "The Butler, Responding" (その執事、応答, "Sono Shitsuji, Ōtō")
In the hinterlands of Germany, the servants of the Phantomhive house are at a loss when their master, Earl Ciel Phantomhive, is both physically and mentally debilitated by the curse of the Wolfman that roams the Werewolves' Forest. In the face of his master's pitiful new demeanour, consummate butler Sebastian, disillusioned, viciously takes Ciel to task, citing a breach of contract. As the Phantomhive household's crisis unfolds, the sulphurous miasma of the Werewolves' Forest encroaches ever more upon the village ruled by the Emerald Witch...
21	May 27, 2015	978-4-7575-4656-1	November 17, 2015	978-0-316-35209-3
099. "The Butler, In a Rage" (その執事、狂暴, "Sono Shitsuji, Kyōbō"); 100. "The Butler, Breaking Out" (その執事、脱走, "Sono Shitsuji, Dassō"); 101. "The Butler, Crossing Paths" (その執事、遭逢, "Sono Shitsuji, Sōhō"); 102. "The Butler, Exterminating" (その執事、掃討, "Sono Shitsuji, Sōtō"); 103. "The Butler, Fate Unknown" (その執事、不詳, "Sono Shitsuji, Fushō")
His matchless butler Sebastian having discovered the artifice of the curse that reigns over Wolfsschlucht, Earl Ciel Phantomhive absconds with the village's precious Emerald Witch and her ultimate spell. But his actions are most unwelcome, and the villagers bare their true fangs at house Phantomhive. As the precocious aristocrat of evil attempts to make his escape from the forest, a monster cloaked in olive drab trundles ever nearer, taking aim at the back of the fleeing earl...
22	November 18, 2015	978-4-7575-4789-6	May 24, 2016	978-0-316-2722-61
104. "The Butler, Disgraced" (その執事、不評, "Sono Shitsuji, Fuhyō"); 105. "The Butler, Announcement" (その執事、尋訪, "Sono Shitsuji, Jinbō"); 106. "The Butler, Hearkening" (その執事、傾聴, "Sono Shitsuji, Keichō"); 107. "The Butler, Compelling" (その執事、強要, "Sono Shitsuji, Kyōyō"); 108. "The Butler, Underwater" (その執事、潜航, "Sono Shitsuji, Senkō")
Escaping the wolves in sheep's clothing of Wolfsschlucht, Earl Ciel Phantomhive, unstoppable butler Sebastian, and the rest of the Phantomhive household abscond with the Emerald Witch. They take refuge in the hideaway of an old family friend-Diedrich, the late Vincent Phantomhive's schoolmate and confidant. But as preparations are made for the passage home to England, word of the Undertaker and his odd behaviour hangs over the proceedings. What little memory could have tripped up the ever-jovial reaper, causing his chartreuse eyes to well with tears...?
23	May 27, 2016	978-4-7575-4997-5	November 22, 2016	978-0-316-50277-1
109. "The Butler, Fanatical" (その執事、信仰, "Sono Shitsuji, Shinkō"); 110. "The Butler, Astonished" (その執事、喫驚, "Sono Shitsuji, Kikkyō"); 111. "The Butler, A Thief" (その執事、泥棒, "Sono Shitsuji, Dorobō"); 112. "The Butler, Soloing" (その執事、独唱, "Sono Shitsuji, Dokushō"); 113. "The Butler, Independent" (の執事、独行, "Sono Shitsuji, Dokkō"); 114. "The Butler, Assaulting" (の執事、暴行, "Sono Shitsuji, Bōkō")
In the heart of London stands Sphere Music Hall, a venue that enjoys immense popularity amongst the populace. However, the fervour with which its visitors return causes consternation in the mind of Her Majesty, Queen Victoria, who suspects the organisation of cult practices and sends Earl Ciel Phantomhive and his impeccable butler, Sebastian, to infiltrate the hall. They are met with none other than the disgraced erstwhile prefects of Weston College and an otherworldly fortune-teller called Blavat, who takes one look at Sebastian and divines his true nature without faltering...!
24	December 27, 2016	978-4-7575-5207-4	October 31, 2017	978-0-316-51120-9
115. "The Butler, Heeding" (その執事、拝聴, Sono Shitsuji, Haichō"); 116. "The Butler, Attired" (その執事、着用, Sono Shitsuji, Chakuyō); 117. "The Butler, Sparring" (その執事、丁々, Sono Shitsuji, Chōchō); 118. "The Butler, Remodeling" (その執事、改装, Sono Shitsuji, Kaisō); 119. "The Butler, Instructing" (その執事、示教, Sono Shitsuji, Shikyō); 120. "The Butler, Lyrical" (その執事、弁情, Sono Shitsuji, Jojō)
A mysterious cult mesmerises legions of followers with glorious rituals of song and dance. But the unbridled passion it inspires gives Queen Victoria cause for concern, and she urges Earl Ciel Phantomhive and his expert butler, Sebastian, to do some digging. Ciel has his own reasons for taking this lot to task, but the discovery of the cult's penchant for blood means the Queen's Watchdog must take swift action. When Sebastian goes probing behind the stage and into the shadows, however, he is met by a girl standing in his way, glinting sword at the ready...
25	May 27, 2017	978-4-7575-5359-0	January 30, 2018	978-0-316-48011-6
121. "The Butler, Listening Quietly" (その執事、静聴, Sono Shitsuji, Seichō); 122. "The Butler, Unmoving" (その執事、不動, Sono Shitsuji, Fudō); 123. "The Butler, Lying in Wait" (その執事、待望, Sono Shitsuji, Taibō); 124. "The Butler, Clarifying" (その執事、明徴, Sono Shitsuji, Meichō); 125. "The Butler, Transporting" (その執事、搬送, Sono Shitsuji, Hansō); 126. "The Butler, Returning home" (その執事、帰投, Sono Shitsuji, Kitō)
Sphere Music Hall, with its elaborate entertainments, has the denizens of London under its spell and at the mercy of its resident cult's nefarious motives. To snap the populace out of the trance, Earl Ciel Phantomhive and his unparalleled butler Sebastian get down to business...literally! The young earl takes the fight right to the enemy's door by opening a music hall of his own. But as a new kind of battle gets under way on the stage, Othello, a fresh face from the Grim Reaper Dispatch, begins snooping around behind the curtains for reasons unknown...
26	December 27, 2017	978-4-7575-5570-9	August 21, 2018	978-1-9753-5475-6
127. "The Butler, Commending" (その執事、讃称, Sono Shitsuji, Sanshō); 128. "The Butler, Inspecting" (その執事、見証, Sono Shitsuji, Mishō); 129. "The Butler, Bedeviled" (その執事、錯綜, Sono Shitsuji, Sakusō); 130. "The Butler, Attesting" (その執事、認証, Sono Shitsuji, Ninshō); 131. "The Butler, Sage" (その執事、宿老, Sono Shitsuji, Shukurō); 132. "The Butler, Approving" (その執事、嘉賞, Sono Shitsuji, Kashō); 133. "The Butler, Vanished" (その執事、没了, Sono Shitsuji, Botsuryō)
While Earl Ciel Phantomhive, accompanied by his indomitable butler, Sebastian, is away on the trail of his quarry, Blavat, the sound of gunshots rends the silence of his London town house. A scene of carnage awaits master and servant upon their return, along with a chilling message from the forgotten past that shakes the young earl to his core...
27	July 27, 2018	978-4-7575-5795-6	January 22, 2019	978-1-9753-836-19
134. "The Butler, Lamenting" (その執事、嘆傷, Sono Shitsuji, Tanshō); 135. "The Butler, Presenting" (その執事、献上, Sono Shitsuji, Kenjō); 136. "The Butler, Paying A Call" (その執事、参上, Sono Shitsuji, Sanjō); 137. "The Butler, Negotiating" (その執事、折衝, Sono Shitsuji, Sesshō); 138. "The Butler, Refining" (その執事、推敲, Sono Shitsuji, Suikō); 139. "The Butler, Incising" (その執事、執刀, Sono Shitsuji, Shittō)
On 14 December 1885-Earl Ciel Phantomhive's tenth birthday-despair was visited upon House Phantomhive in the form of a heinous attack on the family manor. Beckoned by the hatred in the wails of a helpless child, a devil alighted from an undulating purple-black mire. Thus, one story began, even as another ended...Or did it?
28	March 27, 2019	978-4-7575-6031-4	October 29, 2019	978-1-9753-836-19
140. "The Butler, Asserting" (その執事、主張, Sono Shitsuji, Shuchō); 141. "The Butler, Surmising" (その執事、推量, Sono Shitsuji, Suiryō); 142. "The Butler, Chastised" (その執事、膺懲, Sono Shitsuji, Yōchō); 143. "The Butler, Applauding" (その執事、挙揚, Sono Shitsuji, Kyoyō); 144. "The Butler, Under Arrest" (その執事、御用, Sono Shitsuji, Goyō); 145. "The Butler, Escorting" (その執事、護送, Sono Shitsuji, Gosō); 146. "The Butler, On the Run" (その執事、遁走, Sono Shitsuji, Tonsō); 147. "The Butler, In Chinoiserie" (その執事、唐様, Sono Shitsuji, Karayō)
The truth of what happened three years ago comes to light, as the past Ciel sought to erase is thrust in his face. The revelations shake the Phantomhive manor to its foundations, and even Sebastian, the resident devil, can only look on in admiration at the consummate gamesmanship at play. The Phantomhive blood, it would seem, runs thick with the thirst for vengeance...
29	December 27, 2019	978-4-7575-6451-0	July 21, 2020 (digital); August 18, 2020 (physical)	978-1-9753-1489-7
148. "The Butler, In Sorrow And In Joy" (その執事、顰笑, Sono Shitsuji, Hinshō); 149. "The Butler, Rallying" (その執事、鳩合, Sono Shitsuji, Kyūgō); 150. "The Butler, Mesmerising" (その執事、魅了, Sono Shitsuji, Miryō); 151. "The Butler, Indolent" (その執事、無精, Sono Shitsuji, Bushō); 152. "The Butler, Apart" (その執事、別動, Sono Shitsuji, Betsu dō); 153. "The Butler, Assembling" (その執事、会同, Sono Shitsuji, Kaidō); 154. "The Butler, Far Away" (その執事、遠方, Sono Shitsuji, Enpō); 155. "The Butler, Absent" (その執事、欠場, Sono Shitsuji, Ketsujō); 156. "The Butler, Proposing" (その執事、提唱, Sono Shitsuji, Teishō)
The queen's watchdog has become a fugitive, and the "true" Earl of Phantomhive has taken up residence in the manor. The Undertaker has yet to perfect his craft, though, and Ciel knows precisely what his brother is plotting. Even on the run, the master still has his retainers—scattered to society's darkest shadows, they search for the barest shred of information to turn the tide for good...
30	October 27, 2020	978-4-7575-6916-4	August 24, 2021	978-1-9753-2485-8
157. "The Butler, Appraising" (その執事、品評, Sono Shitsuji, Hinpyō); 158. "The Butler, In a Foreign Land" (その執事、異境, Sono Shitsuji, Ikyō); 159. "The Butler, Delivery" (その執事、配送, Sono Shitsuji, Haisō); 160. "The Butler, Careless" (その執事、疎放, Sono Shitsuji, Sohō); 161. "The Butler, Relentless" (その執事、執拗, Sono Shitsuji, Shitsuyō); 162. "The Butler, Hiring" (その執事、採用, Sono Shitsuji, Saiyō); 163. "The Butler, Toppling" (その執事、転倒, Sono Shitsuji, Tentō); 164. "The Butler, Guiding" (その執事、先導, Sono Shitsuji, Sendō); 165. "The Butler, Teaching" (その執事、教導, Sono Shitsuji, Kyōdō)
While searching for Ran-Mao, Mey-Rin's successfully uncovered the covert operation in Baron Heathfield's manor-but an unforeseen hurdle stands in the way of a job well done. A tantalizing offer of employment has Mey-Rin reflecting on her own blood-soaked history that binds her to the former Earl Phantomhive...Will she remain the master's devoted servant, or will she abandon her post for good...?
31	September 27, 2021	978-4-7575-7442-7	May 31, 2022	978-1-9753-4436-8
166. "The Butler, Unidentified" (その執事、不承, Sono Shitsuji, Fushō); 167. "The Butler, Formidable" (その執事、強剛, Sono Shitsuji, Kyōgō); 168. "The Butler, Verifying" (その執事、検証, Sono Shitsuji, Kenshō); 169. "The Butler, Screaming" (その執事、絶叫, Sono Shitsuji, Zekkyō); 170. "The Butler, Wandering" (その執事、流浪, Sono Shitsuji, Rurō); 171. "The Butler, Scattering into Smoke" (その執事、霧消, Sono Shitsuji, Mushō); 172. "The Butler, Psychosomatic Treatment" (その執事、心療, Sono Shitsuji, Shinryō); 173. "The Butler, Recuperation" (その執事、療養, Sono Shitsuji, Ryōyō); 174. "The Butler, Treating" (その執事、医療, Sono Shitsuji, Iryō); 175. "The Butler, Sympathizing" (その執事、同情, Sono Shitsuji, Dōjō)
Mey-Rin and Ran-Mao's victory is secured as they thoroughly dismantle the operation in North Yorkshire. Meanwhile, Baldo and Lau are headed to Wiltshire to investigate a sanatorium for war veterans that is rumored to be headed by a "miracle healer." The skeptical cook is disinclined to believe in the existence of angels—but the incredulous sight that unfolds before his eyes might change his mind...
32	July 27, 2022	978-4-7575-8046-6	July 18, 2023	978-1-9753-6432-8
176. "The Butler, In the Kitchen" (その執事、厨房, Sono Shitsuji, Chūbō); 177. "The Butler, Guiding" (その執事、指導, Sono Shitsuji, Shidō); 178. "The Butler, Scolding" (その執事、説教, Sono Shitsuji, Sekkyō); 179. "The Butler, Rewarding" (その執事、報奨, Sono Shitsuji, Hōshō); 180. "The Butler, Hiring" (その執事、雇用, Sono Shitsuji, Koyō); 181. "The Butler, Reviewing" (その執事、講評, Sono Shitsuji, Kōhyō); 182. "The Butler, Questioning" (その執事、問答, Sono Shitsuji, Mondō); 183. "The Butler, Annihilating" (その執事、消亡, Sono Shitsuji, Shōbō); 184. "The Butler, Wandering" (その執事、放浪, Sono Shitsuji, Hōrō); 185. "The Butler, Agreeing" (その執事、同調, Sono Shitsuji, Dōchō)
Baldo and Lau have uncovered the blood collection scheme at the Athena Sanitorium for Former Service men in record time, but the situation is not as cut-and-dry as they had assumed. While chief nurse Ada wants nothing more than to wash her hands of the whole affair, her duty to give the best care possible to her fellow veterans keeps her shackled to the Aurora Society. After all, the atrocities of war and the guilt of survival are heavy burdens to bear—ones that Baldo himself knows all too well...
33	July 27, 2023	978-4-7575-8699-4	June 18, 2024	978-1-9753-9167-6
186. "The Butler, Self-Directed" (その執事、専行, Sono Shitsuji, Senkō); 187. "The Butler, Going Alone" (その執事、独行, Sono Shitsuji, Dokkō); 188. "The Butler, Foggy" (その執事、朦朧, Sono Shitsuji, Mōrō); 189. "The Butler, Sniggering" (その執事、失笑, Sono Shitsuji, Shisshō); 190. "The Butler, A Brief Respite" (その執事、小康, Sono Shitsuji, Shōkō); 191. "The Butler, Slacking Off" (その執事、怠業, Sono Shitsuji, Taigyō); 192. "The Butler, Imploring" (その執事、懇望, Sono Shitsuji, Konbō); 193. "The Butler, Testing" (その執事、試行, Sono Shitsuji, Shikō); 194. "The Butler, Entering School" (その執事、入校, Sono Shitsuji, Nyūkō); 195. "The Butler, Harkening" (その執事、謹聴, Sono Shitsuji, Kinchō)
Much to Lau's disdain, Baldo offers to help chief nurse Ada drive out the Aurora Society for the good of the sanatorium. But as they hatch a daring plan to thwart its next shipment, Baldo and Lau meet their match when a sinister, deadly foe threatens to bring about their end. Meanwhile, under Sebastian's orders, Finny and Snake arrive at the third blood-collection site—F.O.L. Orphanage, where a familiar face awaits them...
34	April 26, 2024	978-4-7575-9165-3	December 16, 2025	979-8-8554-1074-7
196. "The Butler, Associating" (その執事、連想, Sono Shitsuji, Rensō); 197. "The Butler, Flocking" (その執事、烏合, Sono Shitsuji, Ugō); 198. "The Butler, A Telegram" (その執事、電報, Sono Shitsuji, Denpō); 199. "The Butler, Explaining" (その執事、陳答, Sono Shitsuji, Chintō); 200. "The Butler, Sending Off" (その執事、壮行, Sono Shitsuji, Sōkō); 201. "The Butler, Travelling Incognito" (その執事、潜行, Sono Shitsuji, Senkō); 202. "The Butler, Inner Awareness" (その執事、内証, Sono Shitsuji, Naishō); 203. "The Butler, Eavesdropping" (その執事、盗聴, Sono Shitsuji, Tōchō); 204. "The Butler, Escaping" (その執事、逸走, Sono Shitsuji, Issō); 205. "The Butler, Panicked" (その執事、恐慌, Sono Shitsuji, Kyōkō)
Compared to the evils Finny and Snake were expecting in the wake of the Sphere Music Hall's carnage, F.O.L. appears to be on the up-and-up. Here, the orphans receive a progressive, sophisticated education and the skills they'll need to serve their new family after fledging. But a young girl's abrupt departure piques the curiosity of Finny, Snake, and certain students. As they follow the clues, their instincts, and the most recently fledged child—what secrets might the grounds of this orphanage whisper in the dark of night...?
35	November 27, 2025	978-4-301-00197-3	October 27, 2026	979-8-8554-3994-6
206. "The Butler, Grieving" (その執事、哀傷, Sono Shitsuji, Aishō); 207. "The Butler, Bloodshed" (その執事、刃傷, Sono Shitsuji, Ninjō); 208. "The Butler, Released" (その執事、解放, Sono Shitsuji, Kaihō); 209. "The Butler, Deceiving" (その執事、欺罔, Sono Shitsuji, Gimō); 210. "The Butler, Meandering" (その執事、蛇行, Sono Shitsuji, Dakō); 211. "The Butler, Dressed For Travel" (その執事、旅装, Sono Shitsuji, Ryosō); 212. "The Butler, Heading South" (その執事、南行, Sono Shitsuji, Nankō); 213. "The Butler, Escorting" (その執事、添乗, Sono Shitsuji, Tenjō); 214. "The Butler, Ascending" (その執事、上昇, Sono Shitsuji, Jōshō)
36	September 26, 2026	978-4-301-00780-7	—	—
215. "The Butler, Faded Memories" (その執事、廃忘, Sono Shitsuji, Haimō); 216. "The Butler, Tallying" (その執事、勘定, Sono Shitsuji, Kanjō); 217. "The Butler, Visiting" (その執事、往訪, Sono Shitsuji, Ōhō); 218. "The Butler, Enhancing" (その執事、換装, Sono Shitsuji, Kansō); 219. "The Butler, Entertaining" (その執事, 余興, Sono Shitsuji, Yokyō); 220. "The Butler, Observing" (その執事、傍聴, Sono Shitsuji, Bōchō); 221. "That Butler, Deferring" (その執事、敬譲, Sono Shitsuji, Keijō); 222. "That Butler, Listening" (その執事、敬聴, Sono Shitsuji, Keichō); 223. "That Butler, A Symbol" (その執事、表象, Sono Shitsuji, Hyōshō)

== Chapters not yet in tankōbon format ==
These chapters have yet to be published in a tankōbon volume.

- 096.5. "The Butler, Friendly" (その執事、親交, Sono Shitsuji, Shinkō)
- 099.5. "The Butler, Nursing" (その執事、看護, Sono Shitsuji, Kangō)
- 101.5. "The Butler, Requested" (その執事、要望, Sono Shitsuji, Yōbō)
- 131.5. "The Butler, Resting" (その執事、休業, Sono Shitsuji, Kyūgyō)
- 224. "The Butler, Compassionate" (その執事、憐情, Sono Shitsuji, Renjō)
- 225. "The Butler, Enticing" (その執事、慫慂, Sono Shitsuji, Shōyō)
- 226. "The Butler, Fulfilling" (その執事、畢了, Sono Shitsuji, Hitsuryō)
- 227. "The Butler, Clashing" (その執事、抗争, Sono Shitsuji, Kōsō)
- 228. "The Butler, Forgetting" (その執事、遺忘, Sono Shitsuji, Ibō)
- 229. "The Butler, Arriving" (その執事、着到, Sono Shitsuji, Chakutō)
- 230. "The Butler, Laundering" (その執事、洗浄, Sono Shitsuji, Senjō)
