= Terra Formars (film) =

2016 Japanese sci-fi film

- Theatrical release poster
- Directed by: Takashi Miike
- Written by: Kazuki Nakashima (screenplay)
- Based on: Terra Formars by Yū Sasuga & Kenichi Tachibana
- Produced by: Shigeji Maeda; Misako Saka
- Starring: Hideaki Itō; Emi Takei; Tomohisa Yamashita; Takayuki Yamada; Shun Oguri
- Cinematography: Hideo Yamamoto
- Edited by: Kenji Yamashita
- Music by: Kōji Endō
- Production companies: Tea Time Film; Warner Bros. Pictures; Shueisha; Kyoraku Sangyo Holdings; Dentsu; Avex Pictures; OLM; A-Team; GYAO; Lawson HMV Entertainment
- Distributed by: Warner Bros. Pictures (Japan); Gaga (international)
- Release date: April 29, 2016 (Japan)
- Running time: 109 minutes
- Country: Japan
- Language: Japanese
- Box office: $5.5 million

Terra Formars (Japanese: テラフォーマーズ, Hepburn: Tera Fōmāzu) is a 2016 Japanese science fiction film directed by Takashi Miike and based on the manga series of the same name by Yū Sasuga & Kenichi Tachibana. It was released in Japan on April 29, 2016.

The film is set at the end of the 26th century, and depicts an attempted colonization of Mars. Humanity had previously released cockroaches on the planet, and the would-be colonists encounter resistance by giant anthropomorphic cockroaches.

== Plot ==
In the 21st century, to combat overpopulation, Earth plans to colonize Mars. To terraform the planet, the surface is seeded with moss to create a more tolerable atmosphere and surface temperature. Cockroaches were also introduced to spread the moss.

500 years later, in the year 2599, a crew is sent in the BUGS 2 to clear out the cockroaches. The crew is a group of misfits and criminals taking part in the mission in exchange for pardons.

Entering the new atmosphere, the crew find the terraforming to have been successful and release a roach bomb. Upon leaving the ship they find no trace of the original cockroaches, but instead find human-sized, club-wielding anthropomorphic cockroaches. The evolved roaches quickly kill two crew members with their superior strength and speed.

In order to combat the creatures, the team is given DNA infusions designed to give them special powers. God Lee is transformed into a fire-breathing miidera beetle (Pheropsophus jessoensis). However, the cockroach survives the fire blast and kills him.

A cockroach climbs on top of the spacecraft breaks through its transparent shell, killing two more crew members. Captain Dojima transforms into a strong bullet ant (Paraponera clavata) and kills the giant cockroach. An expedition team prepares to scavenge BUGS 1, the vessel from the previous mission, for parts to get BUGS 2 into shape and return to Earth.

As dozens of cockroaches close in, Tezuka transforms into a rove beetle, sits on the back of the Mars rover, and blows a jet of fire out to simultaneously propel it and kill cockroaches. The captain and Ichiro remain on BUGS 1 to defend it. Ichiro transforms into a sleeping chironomid (Polypedilum vanderplanki) then vents air from the vessel to asphyxiate the cockroaches.

Meanwhile, as the rover approaches a large wave of cockroaches, Osako and Mary exits it to help Tezuka. Osako transforms into a durable black weevil (Pachyrhynchus infernalis) while Mary becomes a rainbow stag beetle (Phalacrognathus muelleri) with optical camouflage capabilities. Together they protect Tezuka as he propels the rover through the second wave. However, when the vehicle rolls over, the three are thrown from the vehicle, overwhelmed and killed. The rover continues its journey.

The surviving expedition members reach the BUGS 1 and it already attempting to send something back to Earth. Outside two more members of the team are shot by giant cockroaches wielding large firearms. It is revealed that Ko Honda, the mission director, is communicating with the roaches, who appear to have human intelligence. As they prepare for battle, Shokichi Komachi transforms into a deadly Asian giant hornet while Jin Muto becomes a desert locust with powerful melee attacks and flying ability. Mina Obari transforms into an orchid mantis, a carnivorous insect. They then discover giant pyramids on the surface of Mars.

Aboard the BUGS 2, Asuka Moriki is an emerald cockroach wasp. She revives Ichiro with water and they launch the BUGS 2 back toward Earth with a giant cockroach egg on board. The egg hatches and the giant cockroaches inside resist Asuka's manipulation and kill her.

Surprised at the new evolutionary advantage of the giant cockroaches, Ko Honda commands the BUGS 2 to fall back to the surface of Mars. The cockroaches aboard the BUGS 2 call for the assistance of the cockroaches on the surface, who sprout wings and ascend into the sky to soften the landing of the BUGS 2.

Back on the surface they face the remaining members of the human expedition team, all of whom inject another dose of DNA to transform and do battle with the hordes of cockroaches. Over the course of the battle they discover that taking a second dose will create an enhanced transformation with increased powers. Jin injects a third time, causing irreversible transformation. Shokichi attempts to defend him and is injured.

Nanao appears, transformed into a silk moth, and spreads her dust over the cockroach horde. A cockroach fires a weapon at her, causing an explosion that destroys the cockroach horde as well as Nanao. Jin and Shokichi escape the explosion and fly away, only to fall back to the surface where Jin dies in his permanent insect form. Shokichi, after sparing the life of the cockroach leader, boards the BUGS 2 again and confronts Ichiro, who saves him from a cockroach attack then suggests that they return to Earth quickly on a two-person spacecraft. As they blast off, the leader of the cockroaches decides against flying after them because Shokichi spared his life.

Back on Earth, Sakakibara fears what the reaction will be when Earth learns of their actions. Ko Honda admits that it would be their downfall and suggests preventing the vessel from returning to Earth and then disappearing from Japanese society. She attempts to shoot him but he stops the bullet and tosses a spider at her which releases a toxic purple spray and kills her.

The film ends with Ichiro and Shokichi in the small vessel discussing their plans for the future. Shokichi plans to build graveyards for Nanao and every member. Besides, he decides to return to Mars.

== Cast ==
- Hideaki Itō as Shokichi Komachi
- Emi Takei as Nanao Akita
- Tomohisa Yamashita as Jin Muto
- Takayuki Yamada as Ichiro Hiruma
- Kane Kosugi as God Lee
- Rinko Kikuchi as Asuka Moriki
- Masaya Katō as Keisuke Dojima
- Eiko Koike as Mina Obari
- Mariko Shinoda as Sorae Osako
- Ken'ichi Takitō as Shunji Tezuka
- Rina Ohta as Maria Renjo
- Ken Aoki
- Rila Fukushima as Sakakibara
- Shun Oguri as Ko Honda

== Production ==
Filming took place in Iceland.
