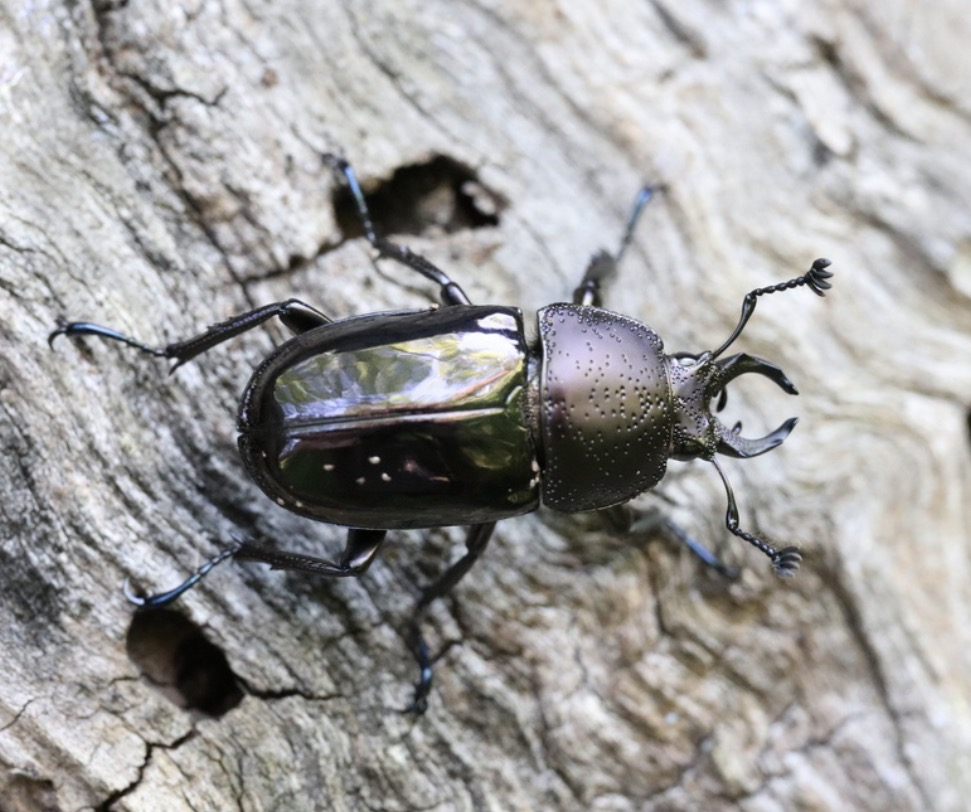
- Male

Scientific classification
- Kingdom: Animalia
- Phylum: Arthropoda
- Clade: Pancrustacea
- Class: Insecta
- Order: Coleoptera
- Suborder: Polyphaga
- Infraorder: Scarabaeiformia
- Family: Lucanidae
- Tribe: Streptocerini; Kikuta, 1986
- Genus: Streptocerus; Fairmaire, 1850
- Species: S. speciosus

Binomial name
- Streptocerus speciosus Fairmaire, 1850

= Streptocerus =

Genus of beetles

Streptocerus speciosus is a species of stag beetles endemic to Chile. It is placed in the monotypic genus Streptocerus.

== Description ==
Streptocerus is characterized by a four-articulated antennal club with the first article longer; a scape longer than the funiculus; unarmed mandibles that are strongly curved and not bearded on the inside; and a prothorax with sides not gradually angled. The head is wider than long, hollowed in front, depressed in the middle, extending above and in front of each eye into a short, blunt angle, and bearing above the antennal insertions a raised, smooth, oblique, short line. The surface is covered with large, round, scattered punctures, denser towards the anterior margin and behind the eyes. The eyes are reniform, with the weakly emarginated part on the side of the thorax. The antennae are inserted in front of the eyes; the scape is slightly longer than the rest of the antenna, lightly arched, slender at the base, barely increasing in thickness until the end which becomes rapidly claviform; the funiculus has five articles, the first four equal, the fifth slightly shorter, bearing a club of four thick, tight articles decreasing in length from the first. The epistome is almost perpendicular, tongue-shaped, slightly spoon-hollowed at its tip which ends in a small point. The mandibles are twice as long as the head, laterally compressed, strongly curved, almost meeting at the tips, sharp above, forming on the upper side a wide, angled tooth slightly turned outward, and another smaller tooth before the tip which is blunt and slightly raised. The maxillary palpi have the first article claviform, slightly longer than the third which is ovoid, elongated, rounded at the tip; the second is half the first. The mentum is wide, short, quadrangular with rounded anterior angles, covered with large punctures. The thorax is transverse, with rounded sides slightly angled in the middle and weakly crenulated, the posterior margin bisinuate, the median surface flat, with large punctures slightly denser in the middle and especially along the lateral margins where there is a trace of a shallow fovea near the middle. The scutellum is triangular. The elytra are almost straight on the sides, rounded at the tips, with angular but not pointed shoulders, the surface smooth, with a small faint stria along the suture. The underside is densely punctured, ruggedly so on the prosternum; the mesosternum forms a blunt angle in front. The legs are strong; the femora slightly compressed; the fore tibiae slightly compressed, armed externally with five or six small teeth diminishing towards the base and a single internal tooth; the other tibiae have two very small teeth in the middle of the external keel and two or three quite sharp teeth at the tip. The tarsi, including the claws, are almost as long as the tibiae; the first four articles are small and short; the fifth is claviform, longer than the first four combined. The claws are strong, sharp, and arched.

The male of S. speciosus is oblong, robust, brownish-black, slightly metallic, dull, with the elytra blackish-bronze, more shining. The prothorax has a subserrate lateral margin, the disc and sides impressed with large punctures. The head is remotely punctate, prominent on each side before the eyes, excavated in front. The underside is obscure bronze, quite shining in the middle. The legs are strong; the fore tibiae slightly compressed, toothed; the first four tarsal articles short, the fifth longer and claviform; the femora shining, blue at the base. Length is 32 mm, width 11.5 mm. The upper surface is brownish-black, barely metallic, dull; the elytra are shining, slightly bronzed; the reflected border and the sides of the prosternum are slightly coppery and quite shining. The underside is obscure bronze, quite shining in the middle. The femora are shining, bluish at the base, as is the internal part of the mandibles. The female is slightly narrower and smaller; the mandibles are very different—short, thick, barely longer than the head, straight, sharp at the slightly curved tip, rough, and with a small sharp tooth on the upper keel; the head is smaller and more punctate; the antennae are shorter, the funicular articles short and tight; the fore tibiae have seven or eight stronger, sharper teeth.

The larva is a typical lucanid, eruciform and C-shaped, dirty white in general colour. The head is hypognathous, orange, with the mandibles, preclypeus and frontal area along the frontoclypeal suture black, and the postclypeus yellowish-orange; the legs are yellowish. The cephalic capsule in dorsal view has numerous large scattered holes on the frontal area, especially near the frontoclypeal suture; the basal margin is slightly convex, the lateral margins almost straight and parallel, the apical margin almost straight and slightly concave in its middle part. The antennae are geniculate with four visible antennomeres, dark brown except for the lighter joints; the first antennomere is irregularly pentagonal; the third is widened distally with an acute ventral lobe bearing the sensory spot, and has seven ventral and two dorsal clear sensory maculae; the fourth is conical with a pair of ventral setae. No ocelli are present. The epicranial suture is Y-shaped, irregular and very open. The clypeus is trapezoidal; the preclypeus black, strongly sclerotized, transversely rugose, with a seta and a strong truncate-conical tubercle bearing a seta on each side. The labrum is ellipsoidal with 15 setae on each side. The mandibles are subtriangular, robust, strongly sclerotized, asymmetric—the left with three teeth on the incisive area, the right with two; the basal tooth is well developed. The maxilla forms a broad unit; the galea and lacinia have resistant short setae on the internal side, with a falciform apex and a single spine. The maxillary palps have four palpomeres, together as long as half the complete maxillary structure. The pro-, meso- and metanotum are subequal. The legs are robust, with abundant granulosities bearing long setae. Stridulatory organs are present: a pars stridens on the internal surface of the mesocoxa formed by an almost straight row of rounded granules, and a plectrum on the lateroanterior face of the metathoracic trochanter consisting of a long row of 42 elongated striated chitinous grains. The abdomen has 10 segments. The anal segment is tubular; the anal sternite has a broad pyriform raster constituted by 58 to 60 strong short setae on each side, directed laterally outward, occupying less than one third of the entire sternite, plus three long setae on the anterior part on each side. The anal opening is Y-shaped and very broad.

The female pupa is yellowish-white in general colour. In dorsal view, the head is almost hidden by the pronotum. The pronotum is somewhat trapezoidal, 2.1 times as wide as long, with a slightly concave anterior margin and smooth surface. The meso- and metanotum together are 1.4 times the length of the pronotum. The pterothecae have a smooth surface. On the abdomen, tergites I to VI are clearly visible; tergites VII to IX are almost fused. Tergite VIII is 2.1 times longer and 0.7 times as wide as VII, tapering to the apex. Tergite IX bears cerci in the form of laterally flattened laminae pressed against the body with abundant very short pubescence. In lateral view, the head is hypognathous and smooth; the cerci are well differentiated on sternite IX. In ventral view, the head is 1.1 times as wide as long. The mandibular thecae are thick, with no indication of teeth. The pterothecae have a curved costal margin, a straight apical margin in an oblique position, and a rounded apex. The metathoracic pterothecae are larger than the mesothoracic ones. On the abdomen, sternites II to IX are exposed, all with smooth surface and straight, well-defined anterior and posterior margins. Sternite III has a pointed median anterior process. Sternite IX is more globose and bears the cerci, the ovipositor opening, and the anus in a bulbous region with abundant rugosity.

== Distribution and ecology ==
Streptocerus speciosus is endemic to Chile, ranging from the Los Lagos to Maule regions. Adults are much more common in summer (October–February).

== Phylogeny ==
Molecular phylogenetic analysis places Streptocerus in the subfamily Lampriminae, where it forms a clade with the Australasian genus Lamprima. It appears as the sister group to all Lamprima species, with the genus Phalacrognathus falling outside the Lamprima–Streptocerus clade.

Divergence time estimates based on fossil calibrations indicate that the split between the Neotropical Streptocerus and the Australasian Lamprima occurred in the late Eocene, approximately 37 million years ago. Within the Lampriminae, the first split occurred between the monotypic genus Phalacrognathus and the Lamprima–Streptocerus clade during the early Eocene, circa 52 MYA.

Biogeographic reconstruction under the dispersal-extinction-cladogenesis model (DEC) supports a Gondwanan origin for this divergence. The ancestral lineage of Lamprima and Streptocerus is inferred to have been distributed across the present-day Australasian and Neotropical regions of Gondwana. The divergence between the two genera is best explained by a vicariance event following the break-up of the supercontinent, rather than by trans-oceanic dispersal. This pattern is consistent with Jeannel's hypothesis (1942), which predicted a Gondwanan origin for austral stag beetle lineages, including the streptocerins. Other austral lucanid groups showing similar Gondwanan vicariance patterns include the Chiasognathini (divergence between Neotropical and Australasian lineages circa 47 MYA), the Colophonini (divergence from other austral lineages circa 87 MYA), and the sister genera Casignetus (Neotropical) and Eucarteria (Australasian), which diverged circa 58 MYA.
