= L. fulgida =

L. fulgida may refer to:

- Lampria fulgida, a robber fly
- Lamprima fulgida, a stag beetle
- Lucilia fulgida, a blow fly
- Limnesia fulgida, an aquatic mite
