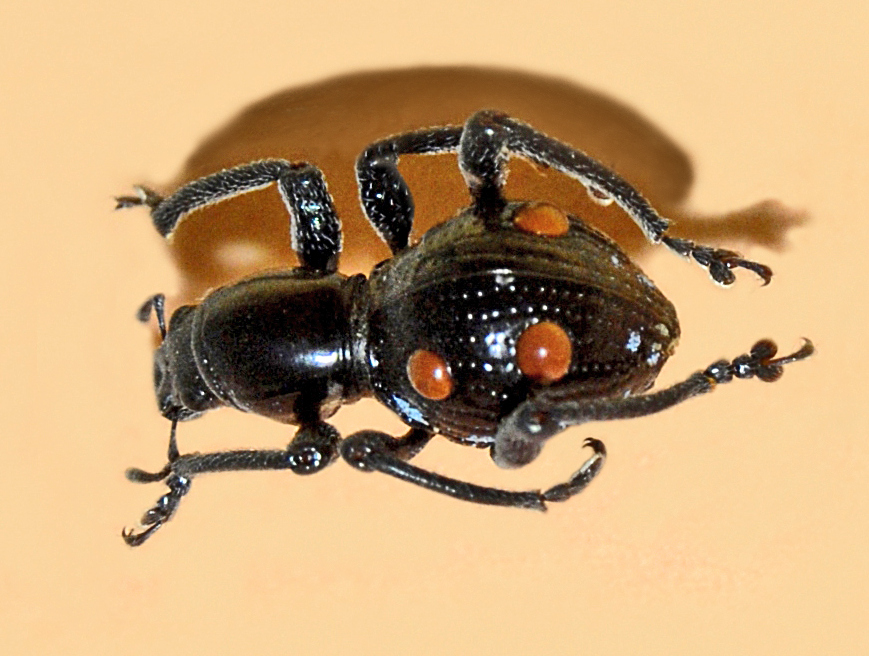
- Museum specimen of Pantorhytes quadripustulatus

Scientific classification
- Kingdom: Animalia
- Phylum: Arthropoda
- Class: Insecta
- Order: Coleoptera
- Suborder: Polyphaga
- Infraorder: Cucujiformia
- Family: Curculionidae
- Tribe: Pachyrhynchini
- Genus: Pantorhytes; Faust, 1892

= Pantorhytes =

Genus of beetles

Pantorhytes is a genus of true weevil family.

== Species ==
- Pantorhytes albopunctulatus Heller, K.M., 1901
- Pantorhytes australasiae Faust, J., 1897
- Pantorhytes batesi Faust, J., 1892
- Pantorhytes biplagiatus Bates, H.W., 1877
- Pantorhytes carbonarius Heller, 1926
- Pantorhytes chrysomelas Faust, J., 1892
- Pantorhytes constellatus Heller, K.M., 1905
- Pantorhytes corallifer Heller, K.M., 1901
- Pantorhytes decempunctulatus Heller, K.M., 1901
- Pantorhytes decemverrucosus Heller, K.M., 1935
- Pantorhytes granulatus Heller, K.M., 1905
- Pantorhytes gravis Heller, K.M., 1914
- Pantorhytes melanostictus Heller, K.M., 1935
- Pantorhytes multipustulosus Heller, K.M., 1935
- Pantorhytes octopustulatus Heller, K.M., 1935
- Pantorhytes opacus Faust, J., 1899
- Pantorhytes papillosus Heller, K.M., 1901
- Pantorhytes papuanus Gestro, 1923
- Pantorhytes pilosus Heller, K.M., 1935
- Pantorhytes proximus Faust, J., 1899
- Pantorhytes quadriplagiatus Faust, J., 1892
- Pantorhytes quadripustulatus (Gestro, 1875)
- Pantorhytes rarus Heller, K.M., 1901
- Pantorhytes rubroverrucatus Tryon, 1891
- Pantorhytes salomonis Heller, K.M., 1901
- Pantorhytes sexpustulatus Heller, 1912
- Pantorhytes stanleyanus Heller, K.M., 1912
- Pantorhytes subcostatus Heller, K.M., 1905
- Pantorhytes torricellianus Heller, K.M., 1935
- Pantorhytes verrucatus Bates, H.W., 1877
- Pantorhytes vibicifer Heller, K.M., 1901
