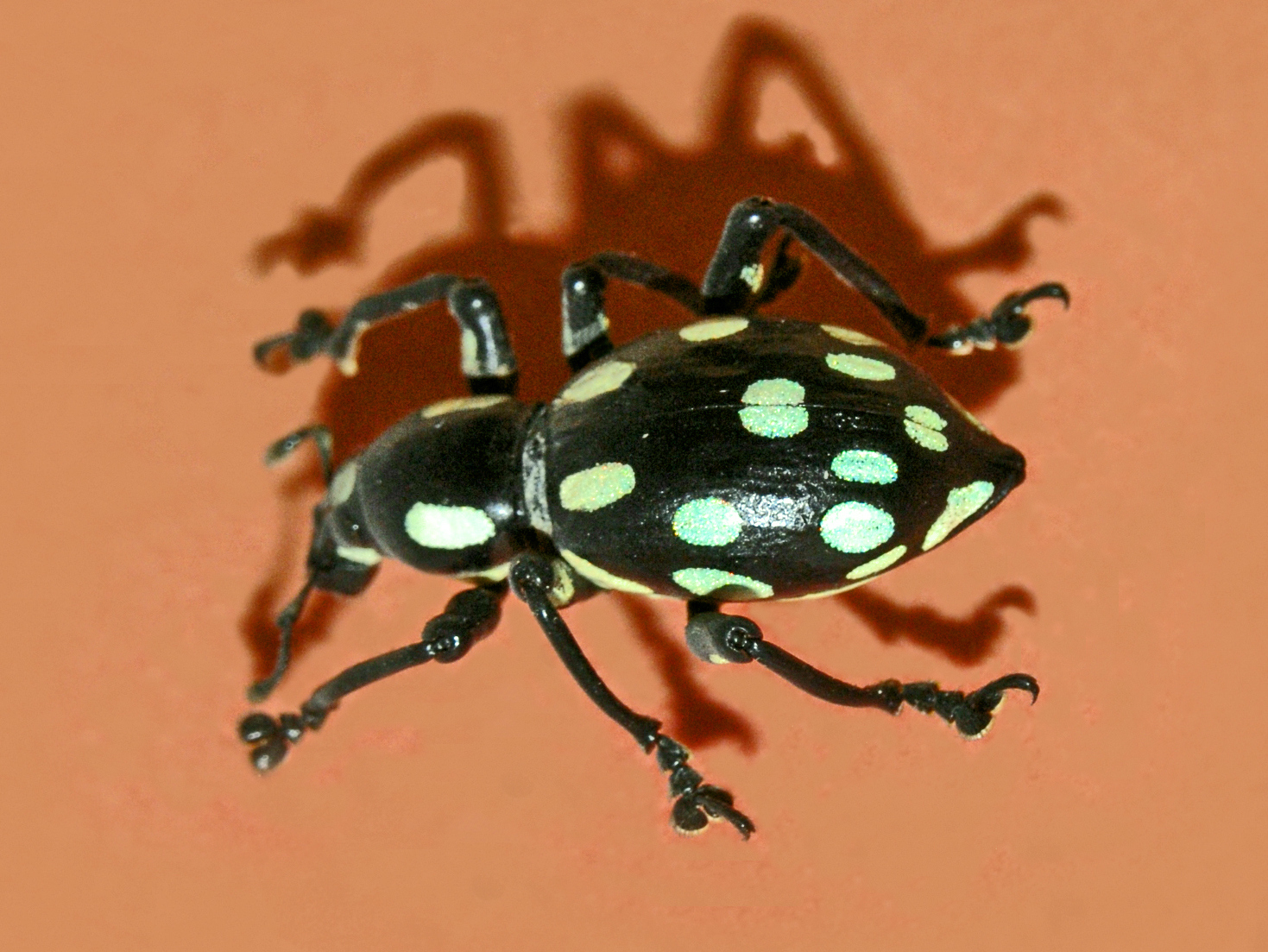
- Museum specimen of Pachyrhynchus smaragdinus

Scientific classification
- Kingdom: Animalia
- Phylum: Arthropoda
- Class: Insecta
- Order: Coleoptera
- Suborder: Polyphaga
- Infraorder: Cucujiformia
- Family: Curculionidae
- Genus: Pachyrhynchus
- Species: P. smaragdinus

Binomial name
- Pachyrhynchus smaragdinus Behrens, 1871

= Pachyrhynchus smaragdinus =

Species of beetle

Pachyrhynchus smaragdinus is a species of primitive weevil in the family Curculionidae.

== Description ==
Pachyrhynchus smaragdinus is black, with a regular pattern of pale green spots.

== Distribution ==
This species can be found in Philippines, Leyte island.
