= Lamprima imberbis =

Scientific classification
- Kingdom: Animalia
- Phylum: Arthropoda
- Class: Insecta
- Order: Coleoptera
- Suborder: Polyphaga
- Infraorder: Scarabaeiformia
- Family: Lucanidae
- Genus: Lamprima
- Species: L. imberbis

Binomial name
- Lamprima imberbis Carter, 1926

Species of beetle

Lamprima imberbis is a species of beetle in the family Lucanidae; for much of its history it was treated as a synonym of Lamprima aurata, but was restored to independent status in 2018.

Of the five species in the genus Lamprima, only two occur on the Australian mainland: L. aurata and L. imberbis. The former is widely distributed, while imberbis is restricted to northeastern New South Wales.
