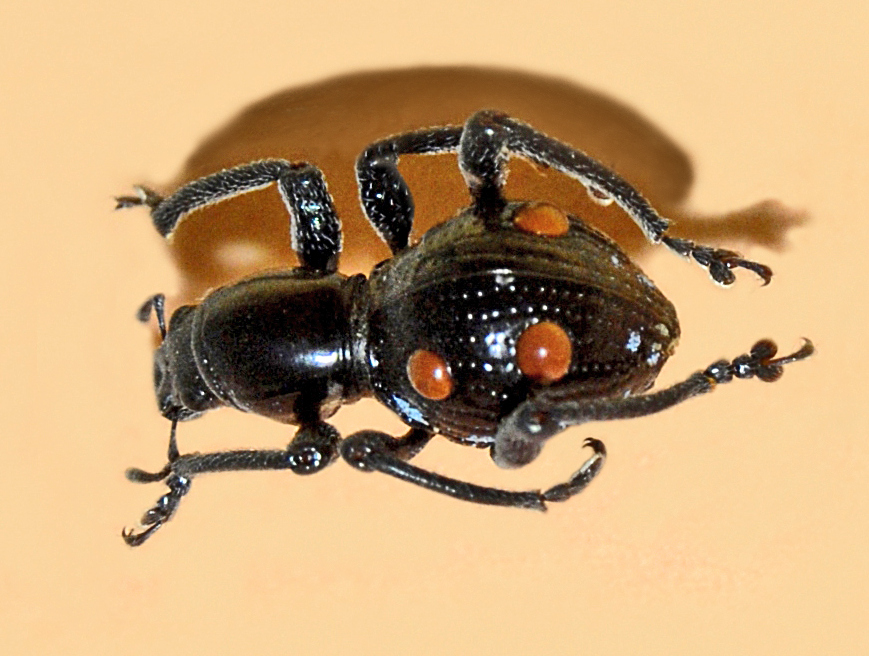
- Museum specimen of Pantorhytes quadripustulatus

Scientific classification
- Kingdom: Animalia
- Phylum: Arthropoda
- Class: Insecta
- Order: Coleoptera
- Suborder: Polyphaga
- Infraorder: Cucujiformia
- Family: Curculionidae
- Genus: Pantorhytes
- Species: P. quadripustulatus

Binomial name
- Pantorhytes quadripustulatus (Gestro, 1875)

= Pantorhytes quadripustulatus =

Species of beetle

Pantorhytes quadripustulatus is a species of true weevil family. This species occurs in Papua New Guinea.
