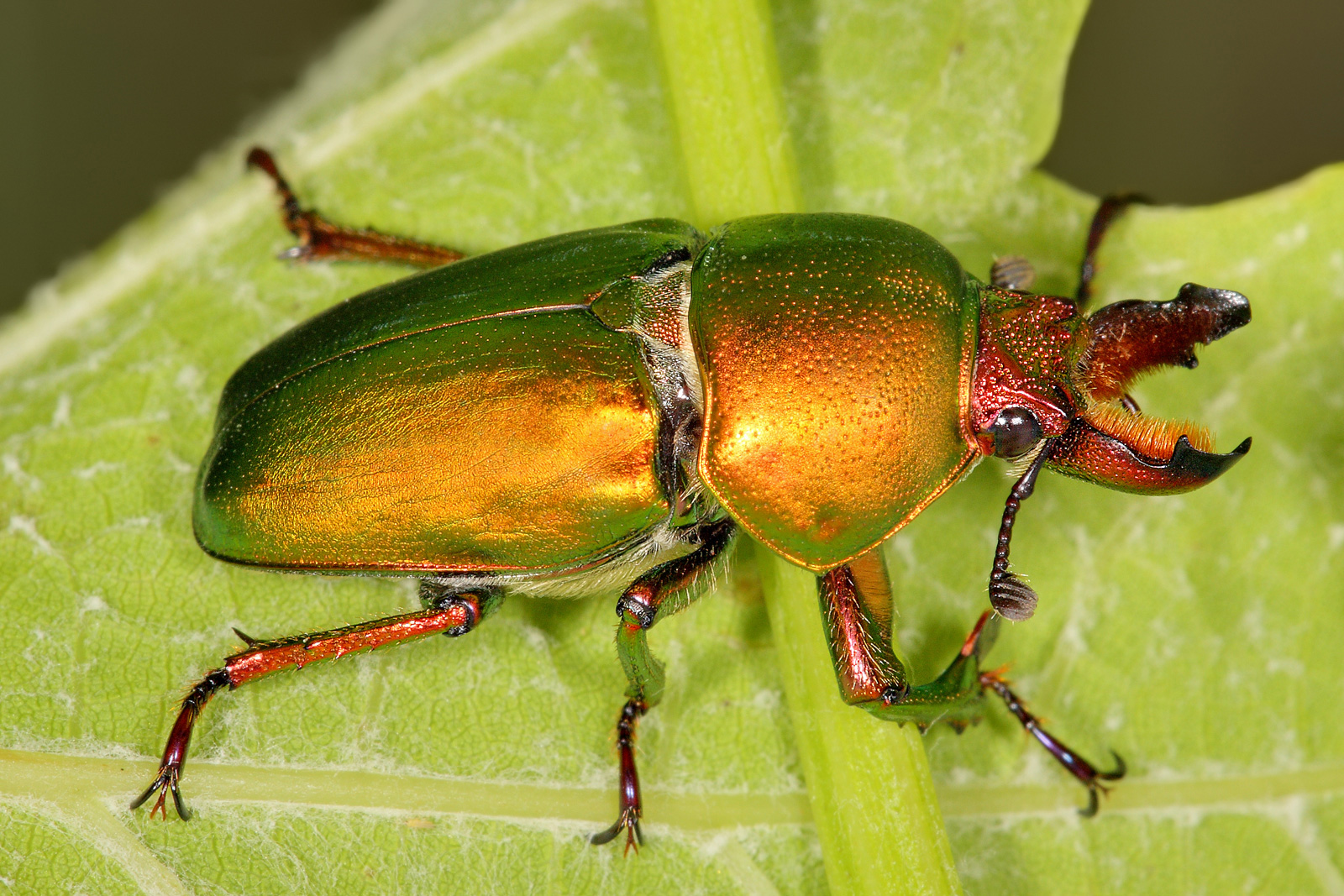
- Lamprima aurata

Scientific classification
- Kingdom: Animalia
- Phylum: Arthropoda
- Clade: Pancrustacea
- Class: Insecta
- Order: Coleoptera
- Suborder: Polyphaga
- Infraorder: Scarabaeiformia
- Superfamily: Scarabaeoidea
- Family: Lucanidae
- Subfamily: Lampriminae; MacLeay, 1819

Synonyms
- Lamprimidae W. S. MacLeay, 1819; Lamprimini MacLeay, 1819; Streptocerini Kikuta, 1986

= Lampriminae =

Subfamily of beetles

The Lampriminae are a relatively small subfamily of southern hemisphere stag beetle (Lucanidae) genera: based on the type genus Lamprima and included in William Sharp Macleay's first major work of 1819.

== Genera ==
BioLib includes:

1. Dendroblax White, 1846 (monotypic) - New Zealand
2. Homolamprima Macleay, 1885 (monotypic) – New South Wales (Australia)
3. Lamprima Latreille, 1806 – Australia
4. Phalacrognathus Macleay, 1885 (monotypic) – Australia, New Guinea
5. Streptocerus Fairmaire, 1850 (monotypic) – Chile

Fossil genera

1. †Paleognathus Waga, 1883
2. †Prostreptocerus Yu & Cai, 2024

== Gallery ==
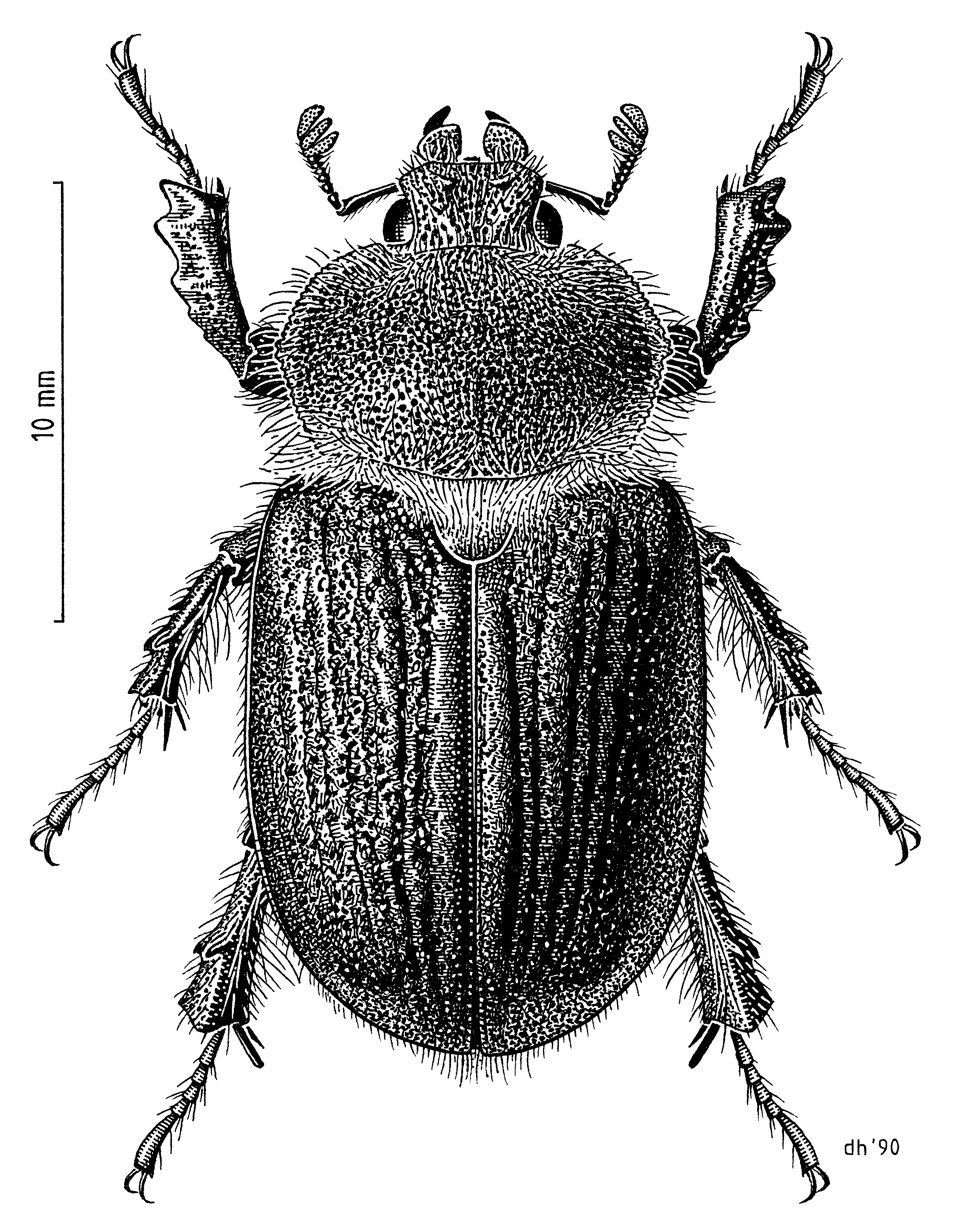
Dendroblax eralii

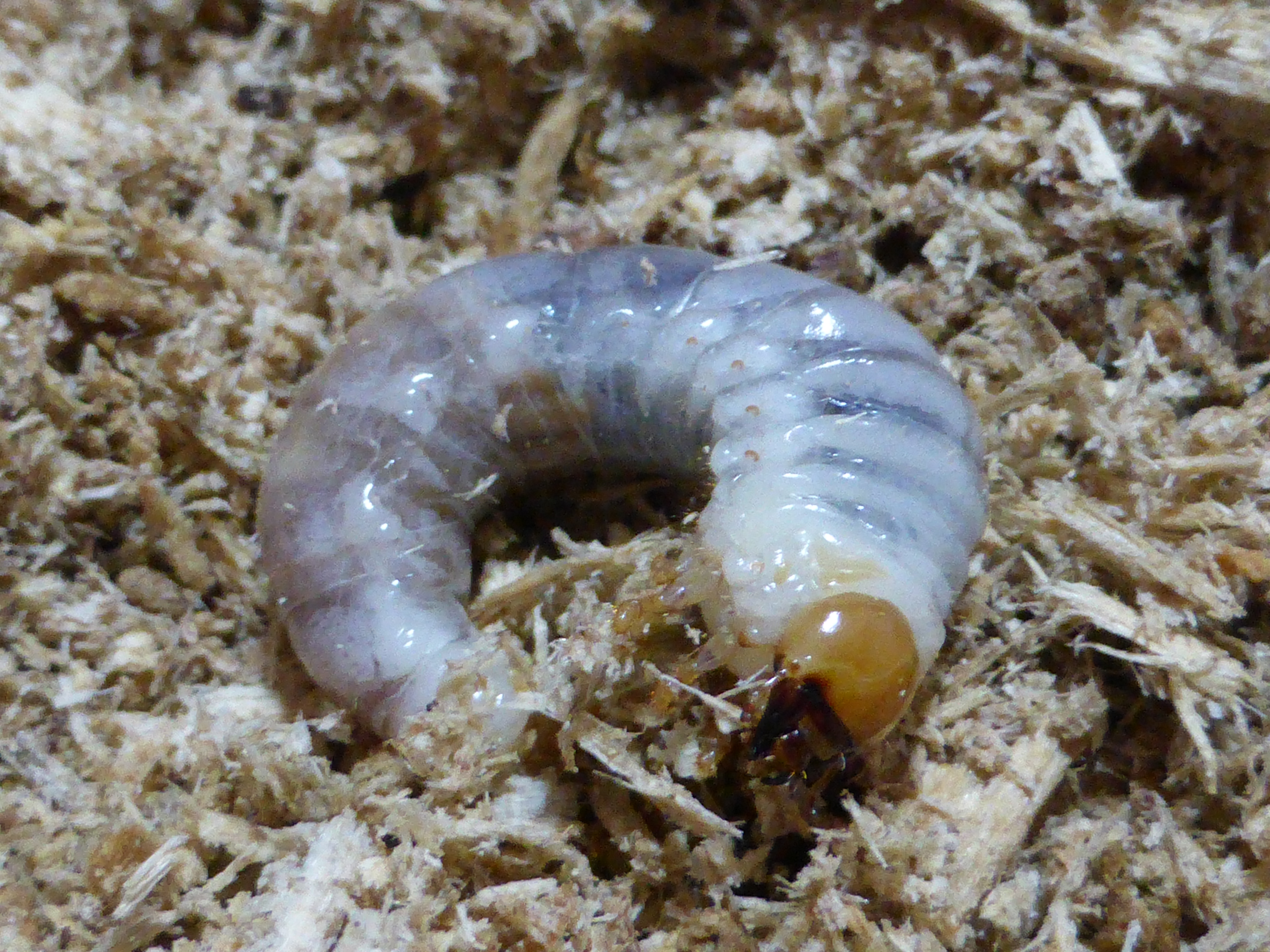
Lamprima aurata larva

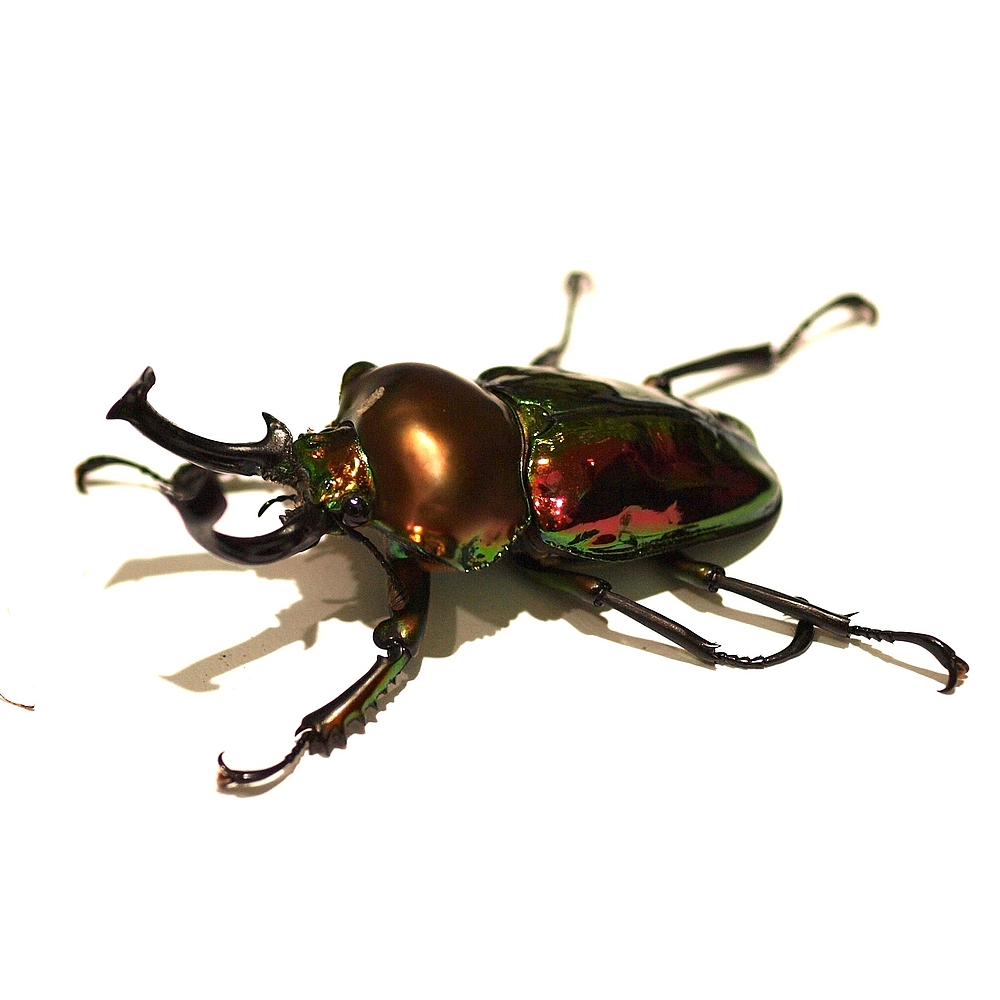
Phalacrognathus muelleri
