= Lamprima insularis =

Scientific classification
- Kingdom: Animalia
- Phylum: Arthropoda
- Class: Insecta
- Order: Coleoptera
- Suborder: Polyphaga
- Infraorder: Scarabaeiformia
- Family: Lucanidae
- Genus: Lamprima
- Species: L. insularis

Binomial name
- Lamprima insularis Macleay, 1885
- L. insularis is endemic to Lord Howe Island

Species of beetle

Lamprima insularis, the Lord Howe stag beetle, is a species of beetle in the family Lucanidae, that is endemic to Lord Howe Island. The insects have small mandibles in both sexes and a metallic green body.
