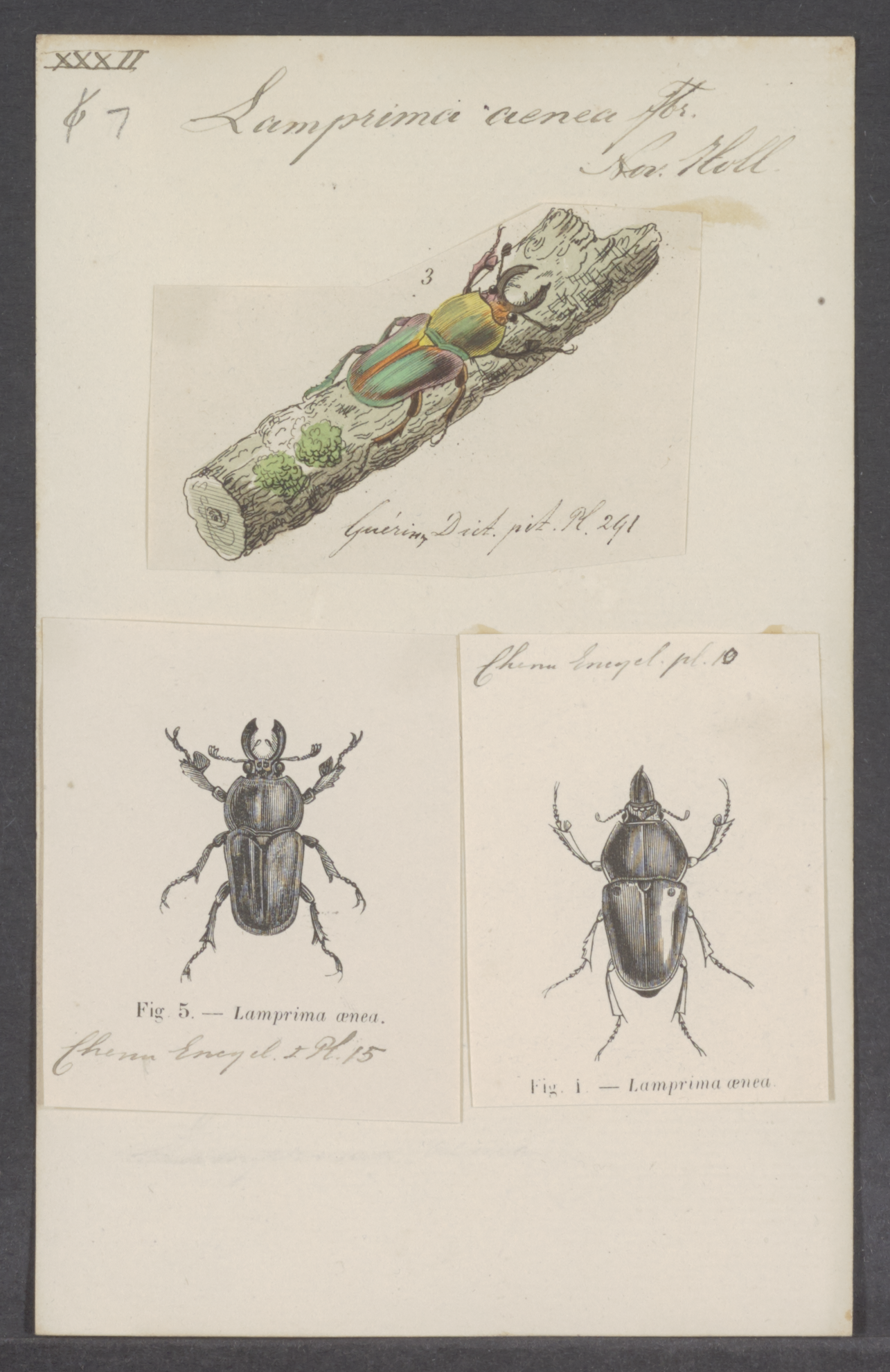

Scientific classification
- Kingdom: Animalia
- Phylum: Arthropoda
- Clade: Pancrustacea
- Class: Insecta
- Order: Coleoptera
- Suborder: Polyphaga
- Infraorder: Scarabaeiformia
- Family: Lucanidae
- Genus: Lamprima
- Species: L. aenea

Binomial name
- Lamprima aenea Fabricius, 1792

Synonyms
- Lamprima schreibersi Hope in Westwood, 1845

= Lamprima aenea =

Species of beetle

Lamprima aenea is a species of beetle in the family Lucanidae that is found on Norfolk Island. Individual sizes range from 27–30 mm for males and 23 to 26 mm for females. It has color variations such as dark bronze, blue, and green; leading it to be sought after by breeders in Japan and Taiwan. Due to the destruction of its natural habitat on Norfolk Island, it has become rare in the wild. It is the island’s only endemic stag beetle.
