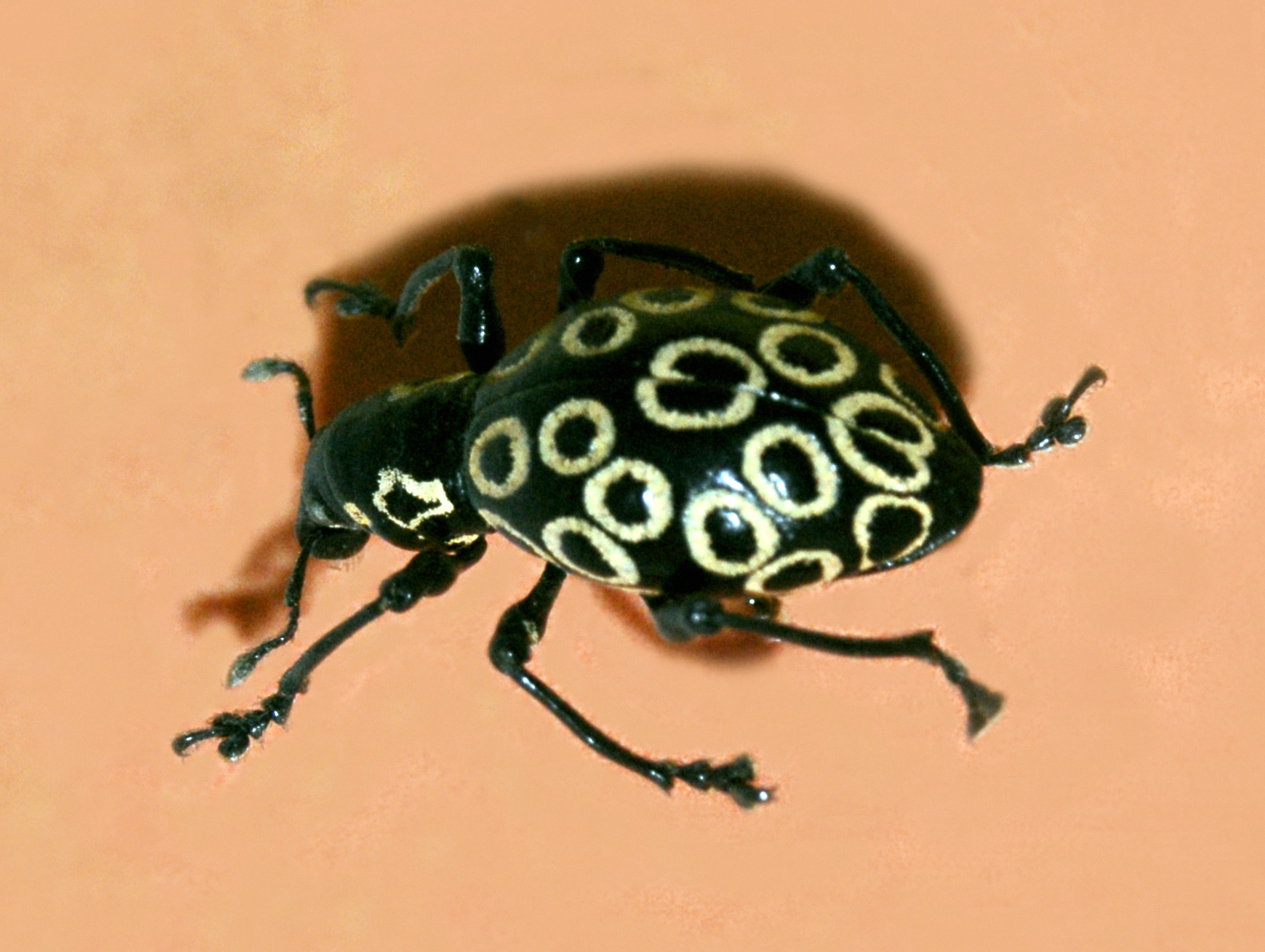
- Mounted specimen of Pachyrhynchus argus on display at the Museo Civico di Storia Naturale di Milano

Scientific classification
- Kingdom: Animalia
- Phylum: Arthropoda
- Class: Insecta
- Order: Coleoptera
- Suborder: Polyphaga
- Infraorder: Cucujiformia
- Family: Curculionidae
- Genus: Pachyrhynchus
- Species: P. argus

Binomial name
- Pachyrhynchus argus Pascoe, 1871

= Pachyrhynchus argus =

Species of beetle

Pachyrhynchus argus is a species of weevil in the family Curculionidae. It is a small black weevil, with blue-green rings on the elytra. This species can be found in the Philippines.
