= Pachyrhynchus obumanuvu =

Scientific classification
- Kingdom: Animalia
- Phylum: Arthropoda
- Class: Insecta
- Order: Coleoptera
- Suborder: Polyphaga
- Infraorder: Cucujiformia
- Family: Curculionidae
- Genus: Pachyrhynchus
- Species: P. obumanuvu

Binomial name
- Pachyrhynchus obumanuvu Cabras, Donato, Medina, & Van Dam, 2021

Species of weevil in Philippines

Pachyrhynchus obumanuvu is a species of Easter egg weevil discovered in 2021. The species has iridescent scarlet and green-black coloring reminiscent of the Obu Manuvu's traditional garments. P. obumanuvu is endangered due to deforestation but more specifically in the western side of Mindanao.

== Naming ==
Pachyrhynchus obumanuvu was named after the Obu Manuvu tribe in Davao City by researchers from the University of Mindanao due to the coloration of the exoskeleton.

== Discovery ==
Pachyrhynchus obumanuvu was discovered by researchers from the University of Mindanao, California Academy of Sciences and the Euro Generics International Philippines Foundation.
