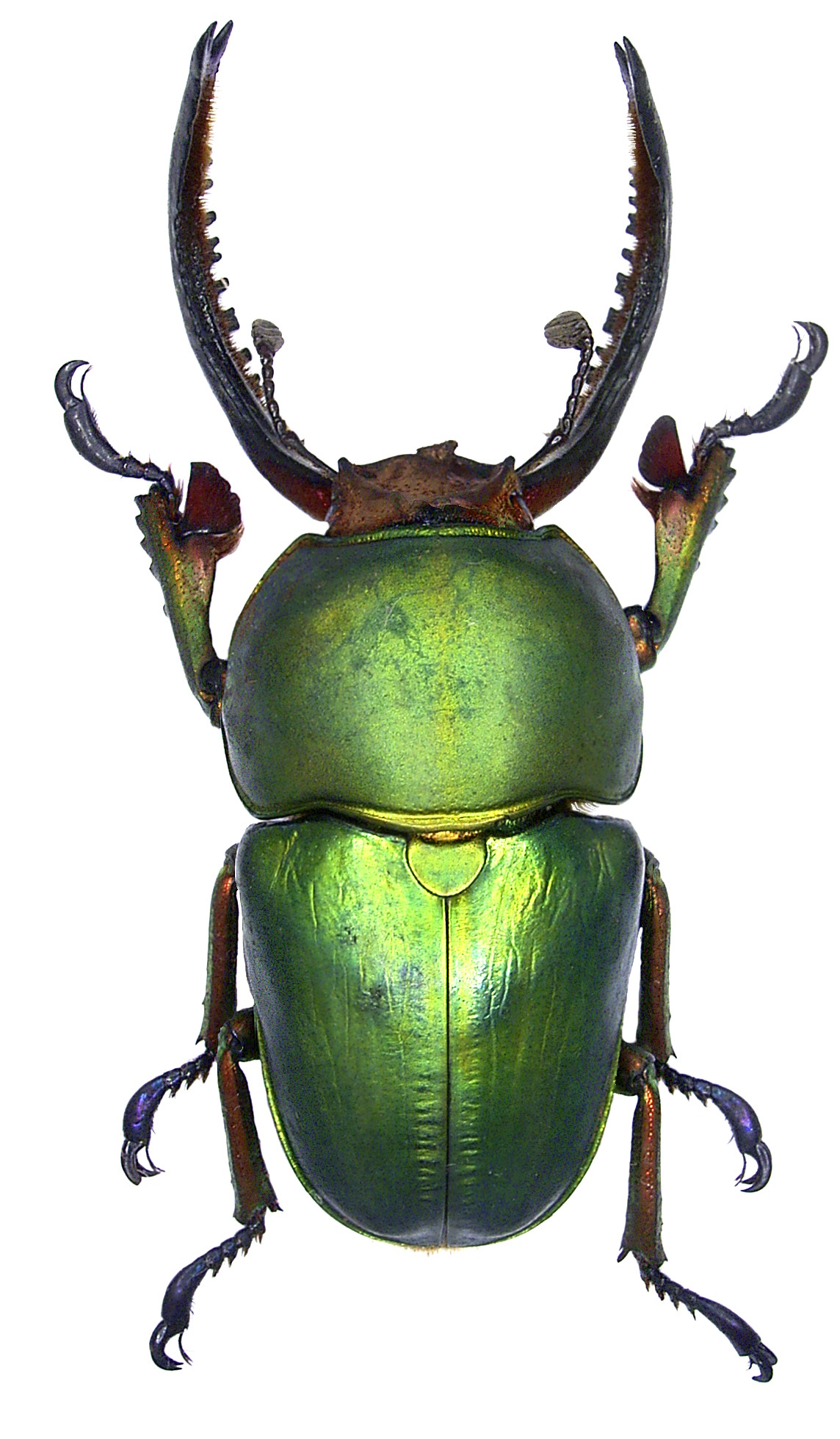
- Male
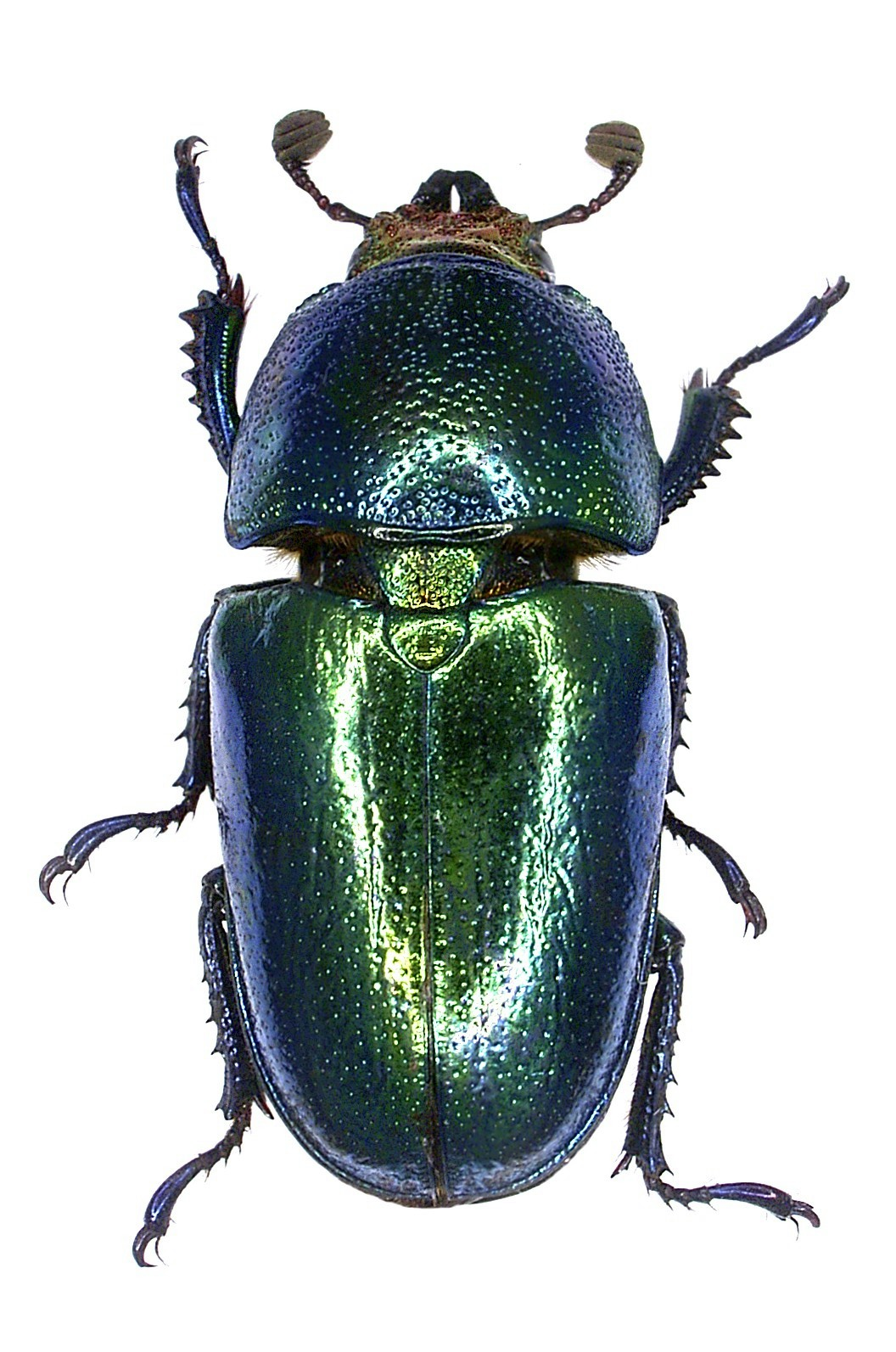
- Female

Scientific classification
- Kingdom: Animalia
- Phylum: Arthropoda
- Class: Insecta
- Order: Coleoptera
- Suborder: Polyphaga
- Infraorder: Scarabaeiformia
- Family: Lucanidae
- Genus: Lamprima
- Species: L. adolphinae

Binomial name
- Lamprima adolphinae (Gestro, 1875)

Synonyms
- Lamprima bohni (Darge & Séguy, 1953)

= Lamprima adolphinae =

Species of beetle

Lamprima adolphinae, the New Guinea stag beetle, is a species of stag beetle in the family Lucanidae found in New Guinea and Papua.
