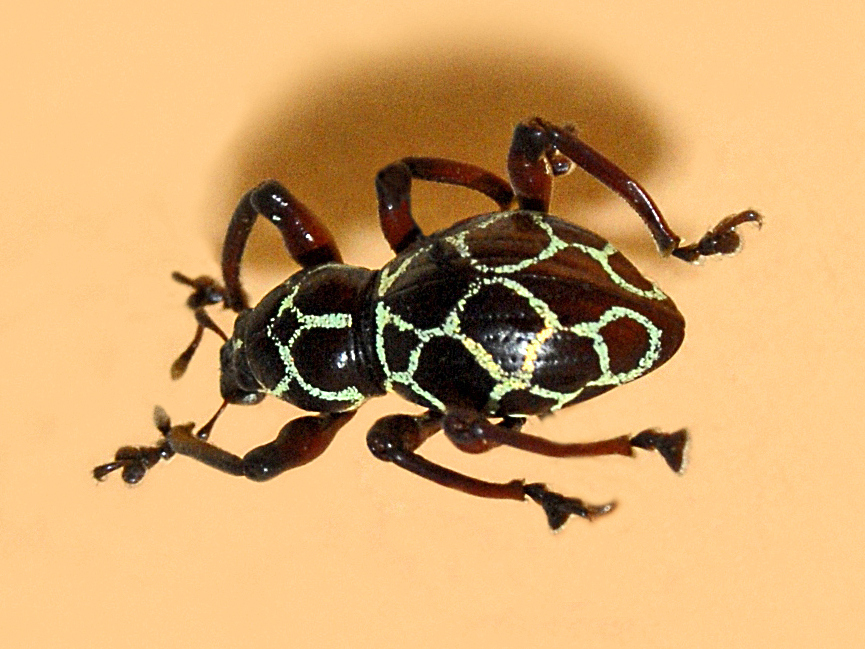
- Museum specimen of Pachyrhynchus reticulatus

Scientific classification
- Kingdom: Animalia
- Phylum: Arthropoda
- Class: Insecta
- Order: Coleoptera
- Suborder: Polyphaga
- Infraorder: Cucujiformia
- Family: Curculionidae
- Genus: Pachyrhynchus
- Species: P. reticulatus

Binomial name
- Pachyrhynchus reticulatus Waterhouse, 1841

= Pachyrhynchus reticulatus =

Species of beetle

Pachyrhynchus reticulatus is a species of weevil in the family Curculionidae. This species can be found in Philippines, Luzon, and Marinduque.
