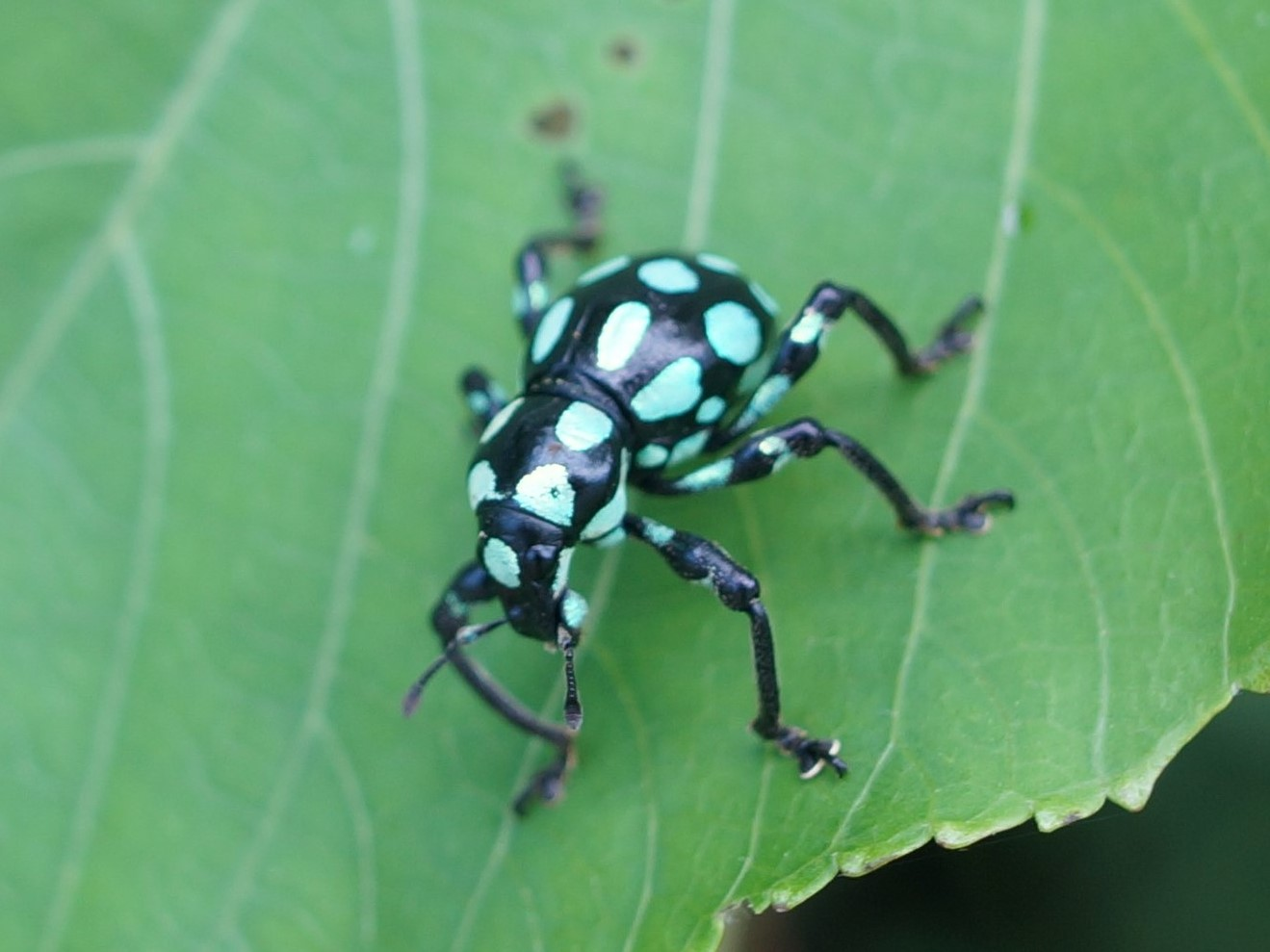
- Pachyrhynchus tobafolius

Scientific classification
- Kingdom: Animalia
- Phylum: Arthropoda
- Clade: Pancrustacea
- Class: Insecta
- Order: Coleoptera
- Suborder: Polyphaga
- Infraorder: Cucujiformia
- Superfamily: Curculionoidea
- Family: Curculionidae
- Subfamily: Entiminae
- Tribe: Pachyrhynchini
- Genus: Pachyrhynchus; Billberg, 1820

= Pachyrhynchus =

Genus of beetles

Pachyrhynchus, also known as easter egg weevils, is a genus of weevils in the family Curculionidae. Most species are found on Southeast Asian islands.

== Description ==
Pachyrhynchus have aposematic coloration. They are flightless, with completely fused elytra. The eggs are inserted into plant tissues. The larvae will then develop and feed inside the stems of the host plants.

The pattern of diversification in this genus suggests stepping-stone dispersal. It is hypothesized that these flightless insects disperse from one island to another by rafting on their host plants. This could be facilitated by the wood-boring life-style of the eggs and larvae, as well as the air cavity under the fused elytra that help adults to float. However, experiments with Pachyrhynchus jitanasaius suggest that survival of adults in water—fresh, brackish, or marine—is low (most died within 12 hours, and no individual survived longer than 40 hours). On the other hand, the larvae living in Barringtonia asiatica fruit is higher, with a fraction of larvae surviving six days of sea water exposure and successfully emerging as adults. This suggests that the eggs and larvae are the primary dispersive stages in Pachyrhynchus. The striking coloration of the scales in multiple species is produced structurally, by means of photonic crystals — periodic nanostructures in the scales that cause constructive interference of light rather than relying on pigment. Early work by Parker, Welch, Driver and Martini identified an opal analogue structure in a weevil of this group, reported in Nature in 2003. Subsequent detailed study of Pachyrrhynchus congestus pavonius by Welch, Lousse, Deparis, Parker and Vigneron demonstrated that the orange coloration of this subspecies arises from a three-dimensional photonic crystal structure within the scales, which acts as a selective reflector for specific wavelengths. These weevils have since become a well-studied model system in biological photonics.

Other research has shown that the eggs can survive digestion in certain birds, such as Hypsipetes leucocephalus and Turdus chrysolaus, which may be another explanation for the genus' successful dispersal.

== Species ==
Species include:

- Pachyrhynchus abranus
- Pachyrhynchus aeneus
- Pachyrhynchus aglaiae
- Pachyrhynchus alboguttatus
- Pachyrhynchus analynae
- Pachyrhynchus antonkozlovi
- Pachyrhynchus ardens
- Pachyrhynchus argus
- Pachyrhynchus biplagiatus
- Pachyrhynchus boronganus
- Pachyrhynchus chevrolati
- Pachyrhynchus chlorites
- Pachyrhynchus chlorolineatus
- Pachyrhynchus cincinnus
- Pachyrhynchus circuliferus
- Pachyrhynchus concinnus
- Pachyrhynchus cumingii
- Pachyrhynchus davaoensis
- Pachyrhynchus decussatus
- Pachyrhynchus elegans
- Pachyrhynchus erichsonii
- Pachyrhynchus eschscholtzii
- Pachyrhynchus fahraei
- Pachyrhynchus fimbriatus
- Pachyrhynchus galeraensis
- Pachyrhynchus gemmans
- Pachyrhynchus gemmatus
- Pachyrhynchus globulipennis
- Pachyrhynchus helleri
- Pachyrhynchus infernalis
- Pachyrhynchus inornatus
- Pachyrhynchus jitanasaius
- Pachyrhynchus jugifer
- Pachyrhynchus lagopyga
- Pachyrhynchus latifasciatus
- Pachyrhynchus mandarinus
- Pachyrhynchus moniliferus
- Pachyrhynchus multipunctatus
- Pachyrhynchus murinus
- Pachyrhynchus neojugifer
- Pachyrhynchus nobilis
- Pachyrhynchus obumanuvu
- Pachyrhynchus orbifer
- Pachyrhynchus ornatus
- Pachyrhynchus perpulcher
- Pachyrhynchus phaleratus
- Pachyrhynchus pretiosus
- Pachyrhynchus profanus
- Pachyrhynchus reticulatus
- Pachyrhynchus rhodopterus
- Pachyrhynchus rizali
- Pachyrhynchus roseomaculatus
- Pachyrhynchus rufopunctatus
- Pachyrhynchus rugicollis
- Pachyrhynchus sallei
- Pachyrhynchus sarcitis
- Pachyrhynchus schoenherri
- Pachyrhynchus scintillans
- Pachyrhynchus semperi
- Pachyrhynchus smaragdinus
- Pachyrhynchus sonani
- Pachyrhynchus speciosus
- Pachyrhynchus striatus
- Pachyrhynchus tobafolius
- Pachyrhynchus waltoni
- Pachyrhynchus venustus
