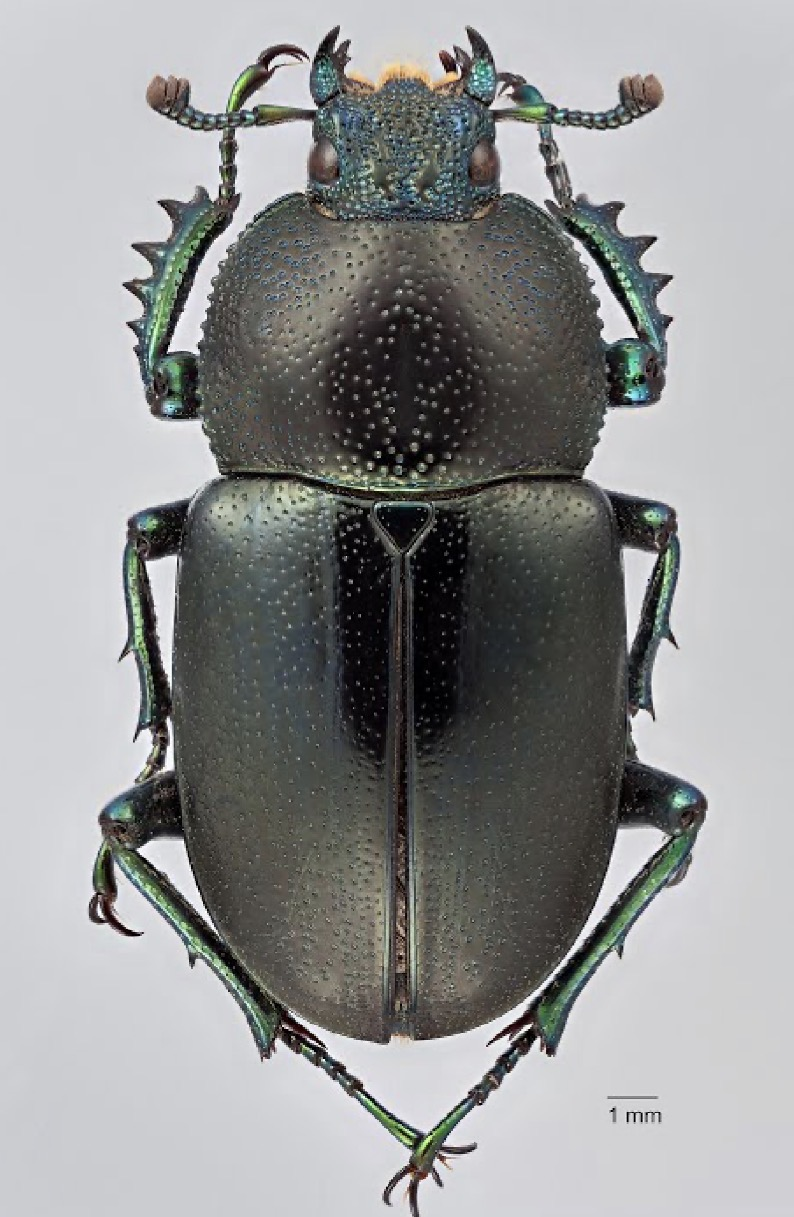
- Only known female

Scientific classification
- Kingdom: Animalia
- Phylum: Arthropoda
- Clade: Pancrustacea
- Class: Insecta
- Order: Coleoptera
- Suborder: Polyphaga
- Infraorder: Scarabaeiformia
- Family: Lucanidae
- Subfamily: Lampriminae
- Tribe: Lamprimini
- Genus: Homolamprima; Macleay, 1885
- Species: H. crenulata

Binomial name
- Homolamprima crenulata Macleay, 1885

= Homolamprima =

Genus of beetles

Homolamprima crenulata is a species of stag beetles placed in the monotypic genus Homolamprima. The genus and species were described by William Macleay in 1885. It is known only from a handful of specimens collected in the Clarence River district of New South Wales, Australia.

== Description ==
Homolamprima is characterized by a triangularly rounded, slightly transverse mentum; a labium that extends prominently beyond the mandibles; prominent, apparently corneous maxillae hidden in long hair; strong, rather short palpi; short, exserted mandibles that are not bearded on the inside; a small, subquadrate head; entire, transversal eyes; short, stout antennae with the first joint clavate (about as long as the next six combined) and the last three forming a foliate club; a slightly convex prothorax with very slightly angled sides; slightly convex elytra; a rather broad prosternum between the fore legs, terminating behind in a prominent round point; a mesosternum terminating in front in a broad crescent-shaped emargination; and rather slight legs with fore tibiae armed externally. The genus shows affinity to the Lamprimidae in narrow head, form, and metallic colouring, but approaches true Lucanidae in its distant fore legs, broad prosternum, and curiously formed mesosternum.

The species H. crenulata is of a rather depressed ovate form. The male has an upper surface that is dull bronzy black with metallic reflections on the margins of the thorax and elytra and the whole scutellum; the underside, legs, mandibles, and antennae are brilliant metallic bluish-green. The head is square, rugose, broadly and triangularly but not deeply depressed, and coarsely and profoundly punctate. The mandibles are shorter than the head, punctured above, smooth on the sides, curving upwards and inwards towards the apex where the two terminal teeth of each mandible meet. The thorax is broader than long, narrowed at the apex with slightly prominent anterior angles, sides rounded and crenulated, base slightly bisinuate, very finely punctate, with a slight depression near the median line base. The scutellum is smooth, triangular, with rounded sides. The elytra are about as wide as the thorax and twice its length, with obsolete striae near the suture and thinly sprinkled with minute variolose-looking punctures. The underside is mostly smooth; the mentum is rugosely punctured; the pro- and mesosternal processes are smooth; the fore tibiae are armed externally with four strong teeth (three near the apex, one above the middle); the other tibiae each have a small tooth on the outside near the middle. Length is 9 lines (approx. 19 mm). The presumed female is longer, broader, flatter, dark metallic green on the head and thorax (densely punctate), with purplish blue elytra, fore tibiae with six teeth externally, and very short mandibles.

== Distribution and ecology ==
The male holotype was collected from the Clarence River in New South Wales. The presumed female is labelled only "New South Wales", but Macleay suggested it likely also came from the Clarence River district. The species is extremely rare, only around four specimens had ever been found.

No ecology data is available, and museum labels contradict: two specimens from dry eucalyptus forests, one from a rainforest.
