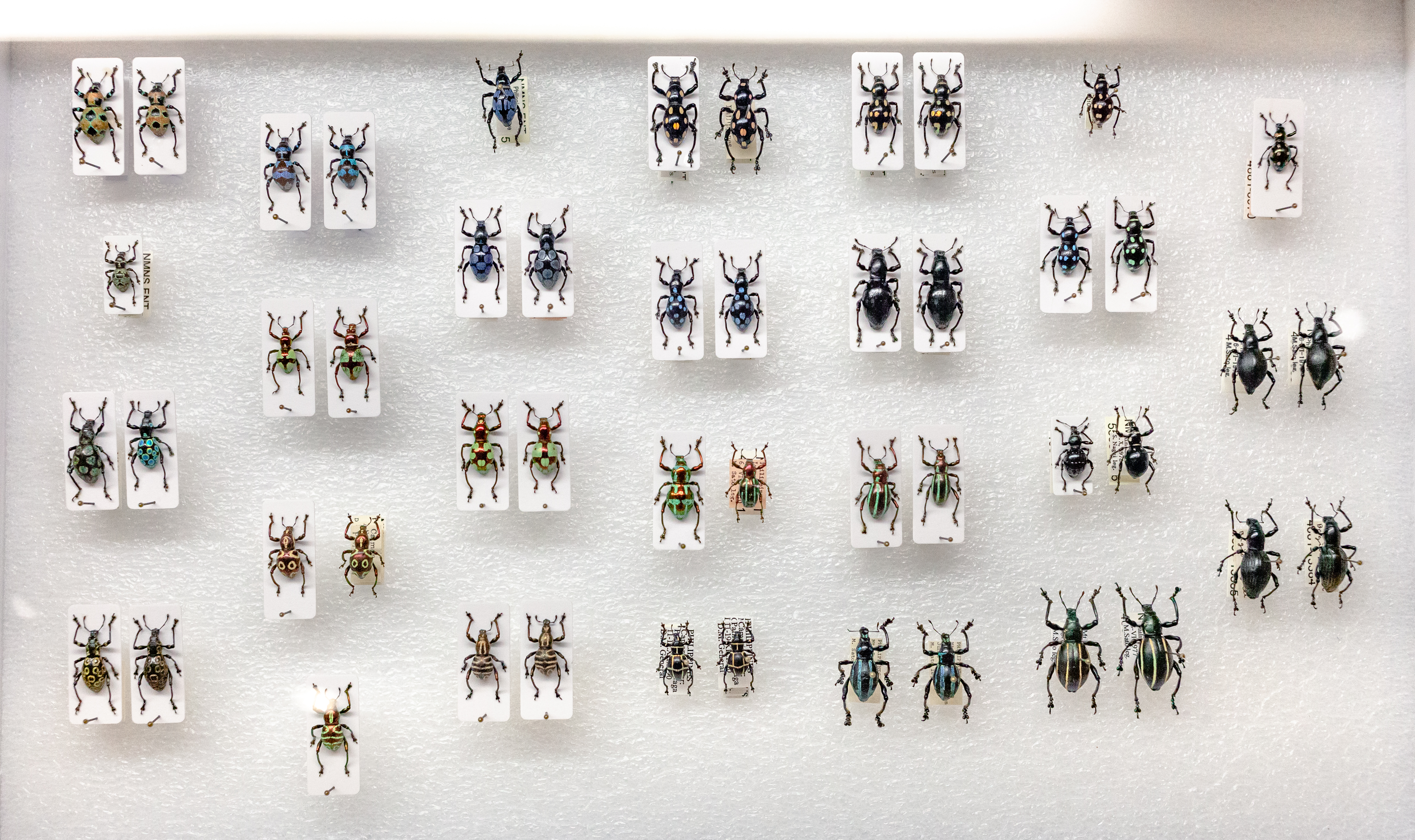
- Museum specimens of Pachyrhynchini from Philippines on display at the National Museum of Natural Science

Scientific classification
- Kingdom: Animalia
- Phylum: Arthropoda
- Class: Insecta
- Order: Coleoptera
- Suborder: Polyphaga
- Infraorder: Cucujiformia
- Family: Curculionidae
- Subfamily: Entiminae
- Tribe: Pachyrhynchini; Schönherr, 1826

Genera
- See text

= Pachyrhynchini =

Tribe of beetles

Pachyrhynchini is a true weevil tribe in the subfamily Entiminae.

== Genera ==
- Apocyrtidius Heller, 1908 (Type species: Apocyrtidius chlorophanus Heller, 1908)
- Apocyrtus Erichson, 1834 (Type species: Apocyrtus inflatus Ercihson, 1834)
- Enoplocyrtus Yoshitake, 2017 (Type species: Enoplocyrtus marusan Yoshitake, 2017)
- Eumacrocyrtus Schultze, 1923 (Type species: Eumacrocyrtus canlaonensis Schultze, 1923)
- Eupachyrrhynchus Heller, 1912 (Type species: Eupachyrrhynchus superbus Heller, 1912)
- Exnothapocyrtus Schultze, 1924 (Type species: Nothapocyrtus cylindricollis Heller, 1912)
- Expachyrhynchus Yoshitake, 2013 (Type species: Expachyrhynchus chloromaculatus Yoshitake, 2013)
- Homalocyrtus Heller, 1912 (Type species: not designated)
- Macrocyrtus Heller, 1912 (Type species: Apocyrtus nigrans Pascoe, 1881)
  - Subgenus Exmacrocyrtus Schultze, 1924 (Type species: Macrocyrtus erosus (Pascoe, 1873))
- Metapocyrtus Heller, 1912 (Type species: Apocyrtus rugicollis Chevrolat, 1881)
  - Subgenus Artapocyrtus Heller, 1912 (Type species: Apocyrtus bifasciatus Waterhouse, 1842)
  - Subgenus Dolichocephalocyrtus Schultze, 1925 (Type species: Metapocyrtus dolosus Heller, 1913)
  - Subgenus Orthocyrtus Heller, 1912 (Type species: Metapocyrtus triangularis Heller, 1913)
  - Subgenus Sclerocyrtus Heller, 1912 (Type species: Metapocyrtus asper Heller, 1913)
  - Subgenus Sphenomorphoidea Heller, 1912 (Type species: Apocyrtus metallicus Waterhouse, 1842)
  - Subgenus Trachycyrtus Heller, 1912 (Type species: Apocyrtus profanus Ercihson, 1834)
- Nothapocyrtus Heller, 1912 (Type species: Nothapocyrtus translucidus Heller, 1912)
- Pachyrhynchus Germer, 1824 (Type species: Pachyrhynchus moniliferus Germer, 1824)
- Pantorhytes Faust, 1892 (Type species: Pachyrhynchus chrysomelas Montrouzier, 1855)
- Proapocyrtus Schultze, 1918 (Type species: Proapocyrtus insularis Schultze, 1918)
- Pseudapocyrtus Heller, 1912 (Type species: Pseudoapocyrtus imitator Heller, 1912)
- Schauenbergia Osella, 1977 (Type species: Schauenbergia anophthalma Osella, 1977)
- Sphenomorpha Behrens, 1887 (Type species: not designated)
- Trichomacrocyrtus Yoshitake, 2018 (Type species: Eupachyrrhynchus hieroglyphicus Scultze, 1917)
