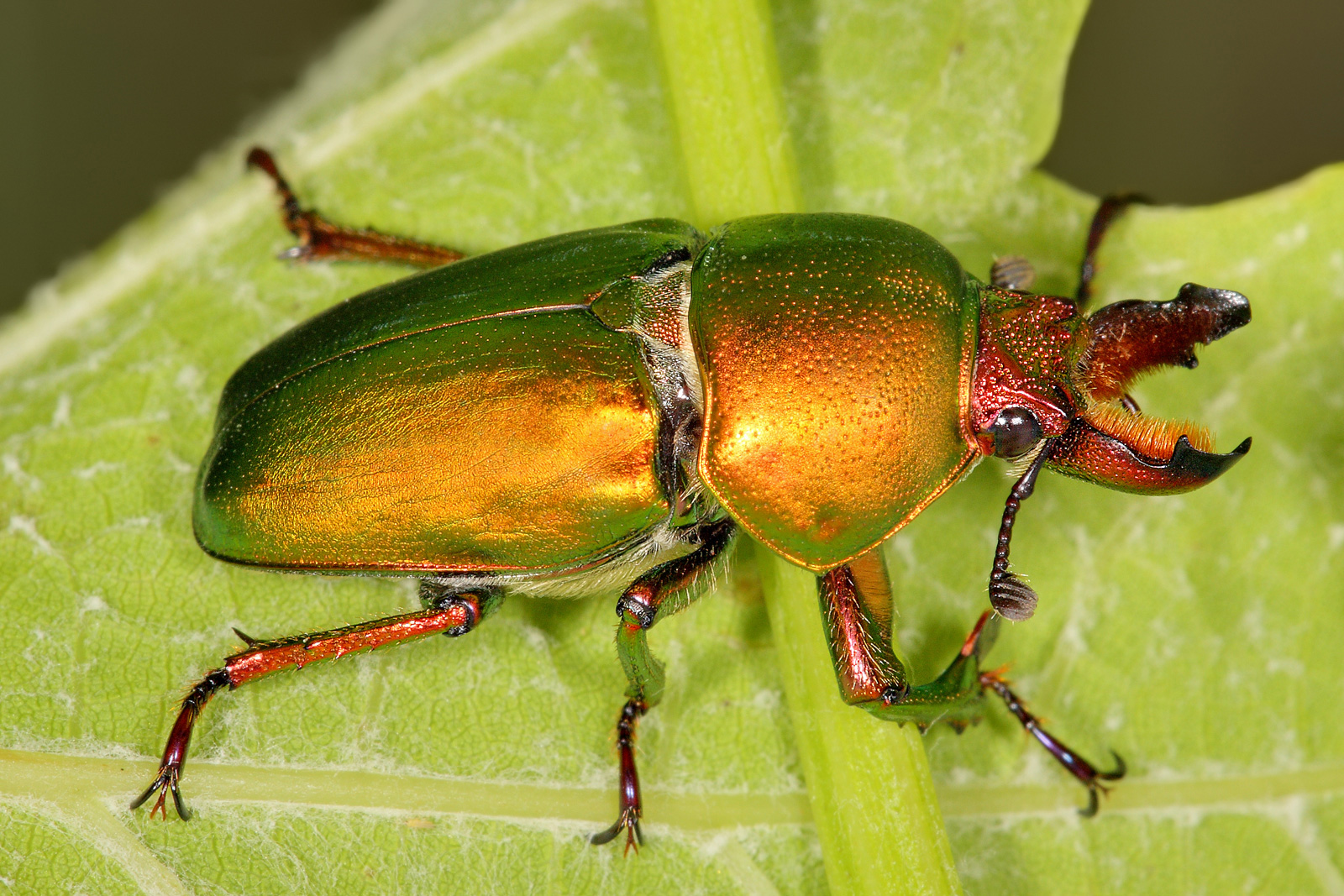
- Lamprima aurata male

Scientific classification
- Kingdom: Animalia
- Phylum: Arthropoda
- Class: Insecta
- Order: Coleoptera
- Suborder: Polyphaga
- Infraorder: Scarabaeiformia
- Family: Lucanidae
- Subfamily: Lampriminae
- Genus: Lamprima; Latreille, 1806

= Lamprima =

Genus of beetles

Lamprima is a genus of stag beetles typical of the subfamily Lampriminae; species are found in Australasia.

== Species ==
Male	Female	Larvae	Scientific name	Distribution
			Lamprima adolphinae (Gestro, 1875)	New Guinea
			Lamprima aenea Fabricius, 1792	Norfolk Island
			Lamprima aurata Latreille, 1817	Australia
			Lamprima imberbis Carter, 1926	New South Wales
			Lamprima insularis Macleay, 1885	Lord Howe Island

== See also ==
- Phalacrognathus muelleri
