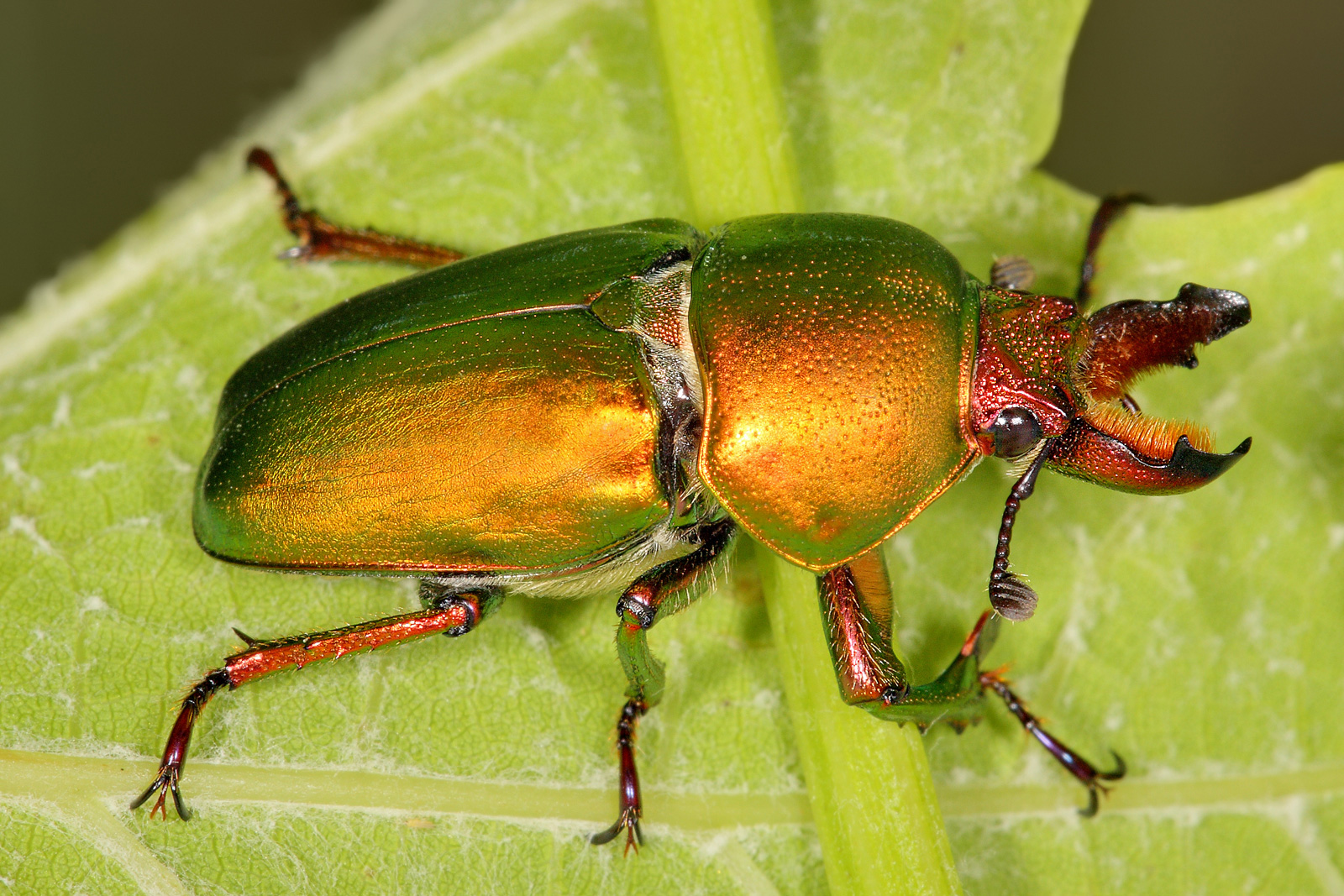
- Adult male
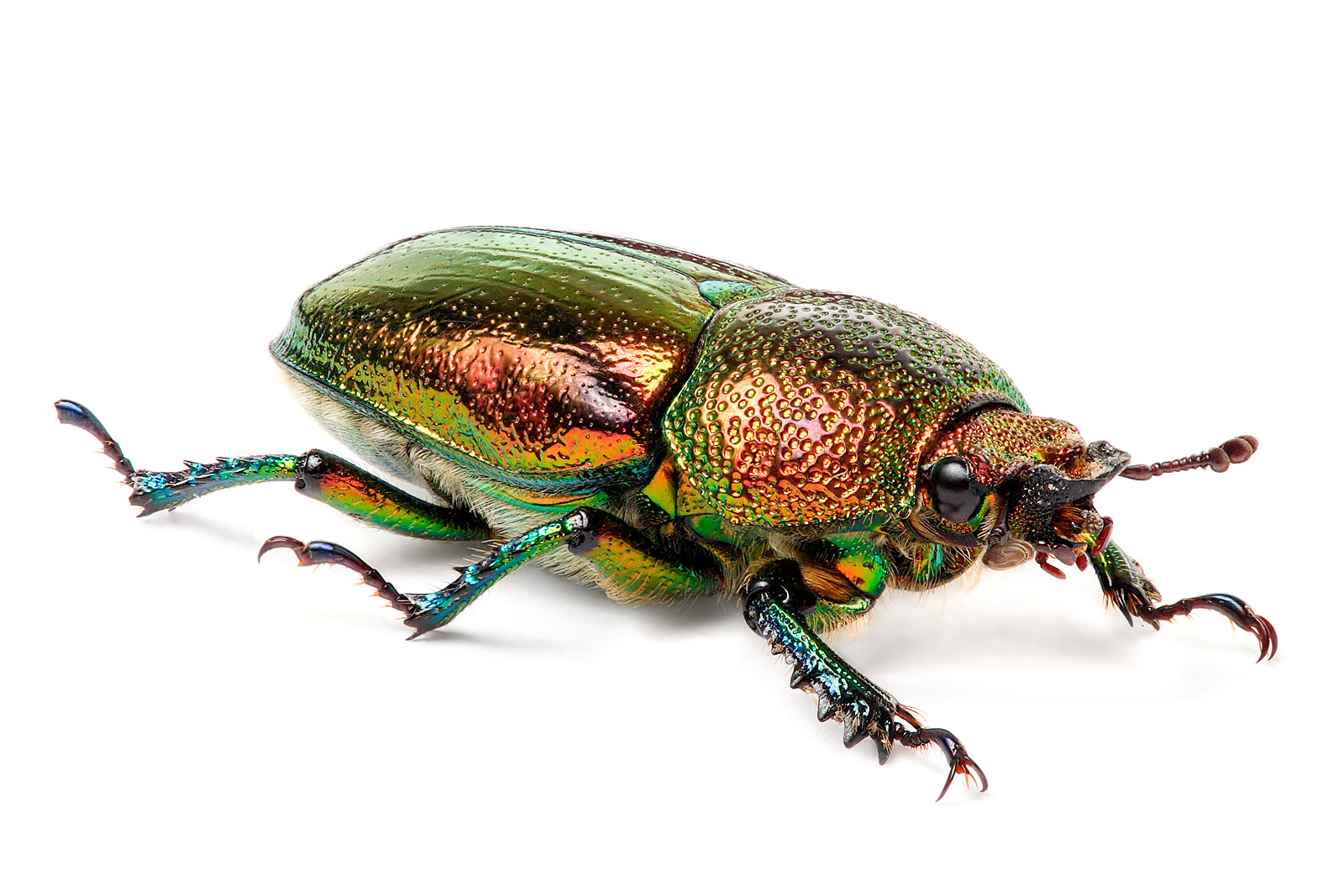
- Adult female

Scientific classification
- Kingdom: Animalia
- Phylum: Arthropoda
- Class: Insecta
- Order: Coleoptera
- Suborder: Polyphaga
- Infraorder: Scarabaeiformia
- Family: Lucanidae
- Genus: Lamprima
- Species: L. aurata

Binomial name
- Lamprima aurata Latreille, 1817

Synonyms
- Lamprima cuprea Latreille, 1817; Lamprima latreillii Macleay, 1819; Lamprima pygmaea Macleay, 1819; Lamprima fulgida Boisduval, 1835; Lamprima micardi Reiche, 1841; Lamprima rutilans Erichson, 1842; Lamprima splendens Erichson, 1842; Lamprima viridis Erichson, 1842; Lamprima nigricollis Hope in Westwood, 1845; Lamprima purpurascens Hope in Westwood, 1845; Lamprima sumptuosa Hope in Westwood, 1845; Lamprima tasmaniae Hope in Westwood, 1845; Lamprima varians Burmeister, 1847; Lamprima cultridens Burmeister, 1847; Lamprima amplicollis Thomson, 1862; Lamprima krefftii Macleay, 1871; Lamprima violacea Macleay, 1885; Lamprima mandibularis Macleay, 1885; Lamprima sericea Macleay, 1885; Lamprima nigripennis Macleay, 1885; Lamprima minima Macleay, 1885 Lamprima mariae Lea, 1910; Lamprima coerulea Boileau, 1913; Lamprima insularis Boileau, 1913 (Homo.)

= Lamprima aurata =

Species of beetle

Lamprima aurata, the golden stag beetle, is a species of beetle in the family Lucanidae. In Tasmania, this species is referred to by the common name of Christmas beetle, a name that is normally used for beetles in the family Scarabaeidae, genus Anoplognathus.

== Description ==
This beetle has an oval, shiny body. It measures between 15 and 25 mm in length. It is fairly variable in coloration, so it has been given many names by various authors. The colour of the males is typically metallic golden green or yellow with colorful legs, while females may be blue, blue-green or dull brown. Females are smaller than the males, and males have larger mandibles prolonged forwards used for fighting.

== Distribution and habitat ==
Lamprima aurata is native to Australia and can be found in Tasmania and south-eastern mainland Australia in dry sclerophyll forests.

Of the five species in the genus Lamprima, only two occur on the Australian mainland: L. aurata and the closely related L. imberbis, which live in northeastern New South Wales.

== Biology ==
The larvae are sapro-xylophagous and will spend two years feeding on rotting logs. Adults are free-flying and will move about on the ground during the day and drink the nectar of flowers, especially eucalypts. Males can be found on rotting logs defending their territory.

== Gallery ==
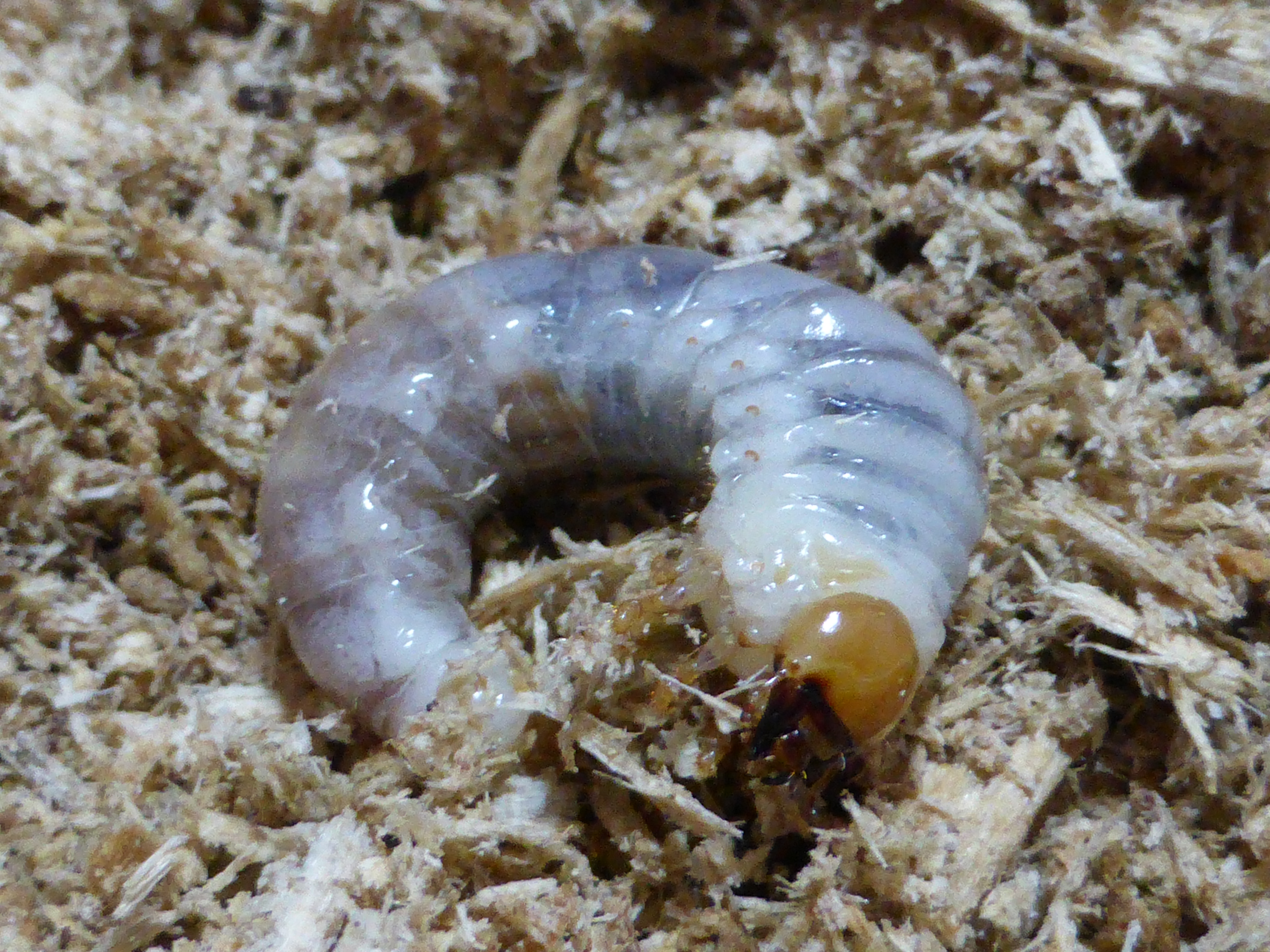
Golden stag larva

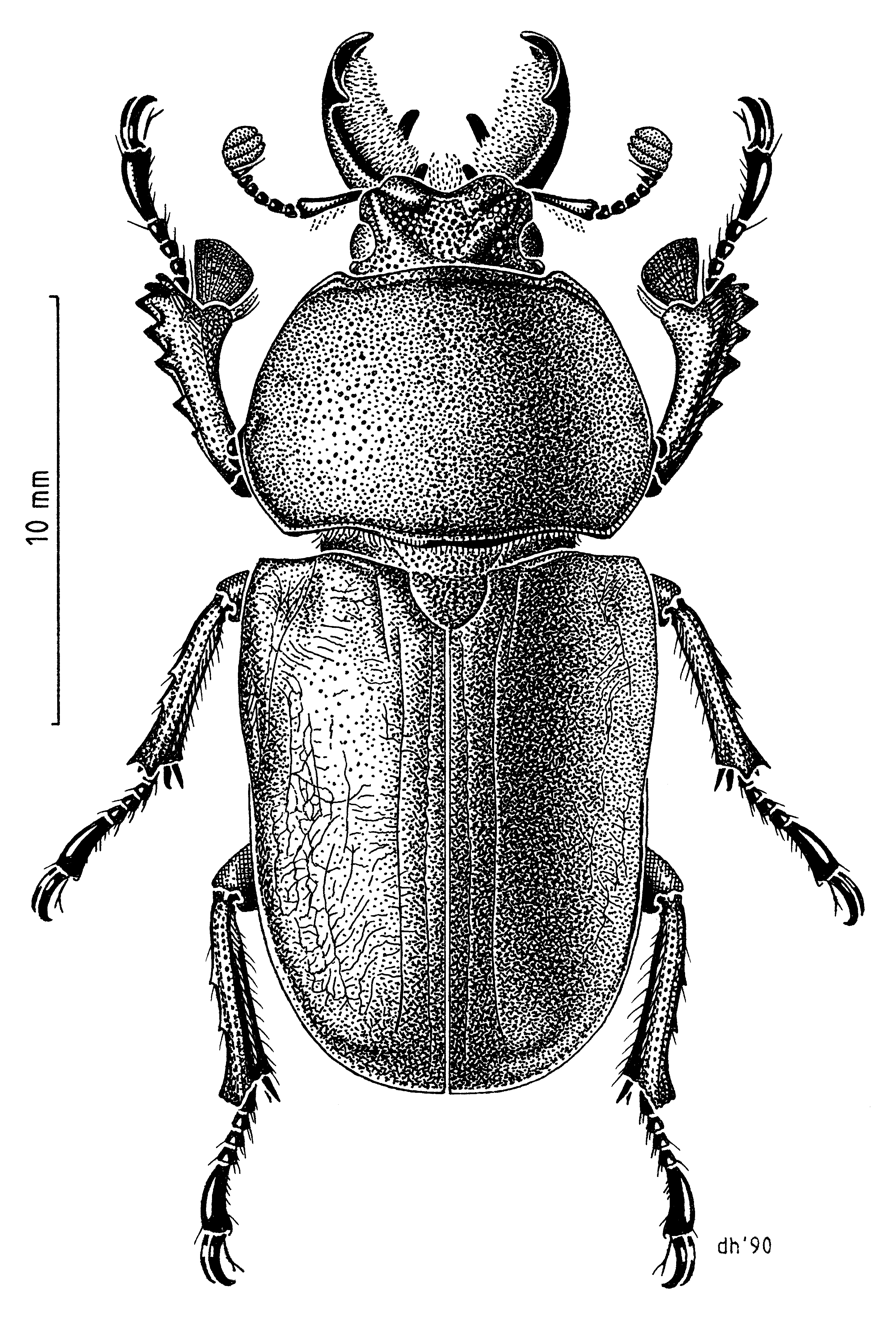
Illustration of male by Des Helmore
