= Pachyrhynchus infernalis =

Scientific classification
- Kingdom: Animalia
- Phylum: Arthropoda
- Class: Insecta
- Order: Coleoptera
- Suborder: Polyphaga
- Infraorder: Cucujiformia
- Family: Curculionidae
- Genus: Pachyrhynchus
- Species: P. infernalis

Binomial name
- Pachyrhynchus infernalis Fairmaire, 1879

Species of beetle

Pachyrhynchus infernalis is a weevil species in the family Curculionidae. It is a small black weevil known by its particularly resistant carapace.
