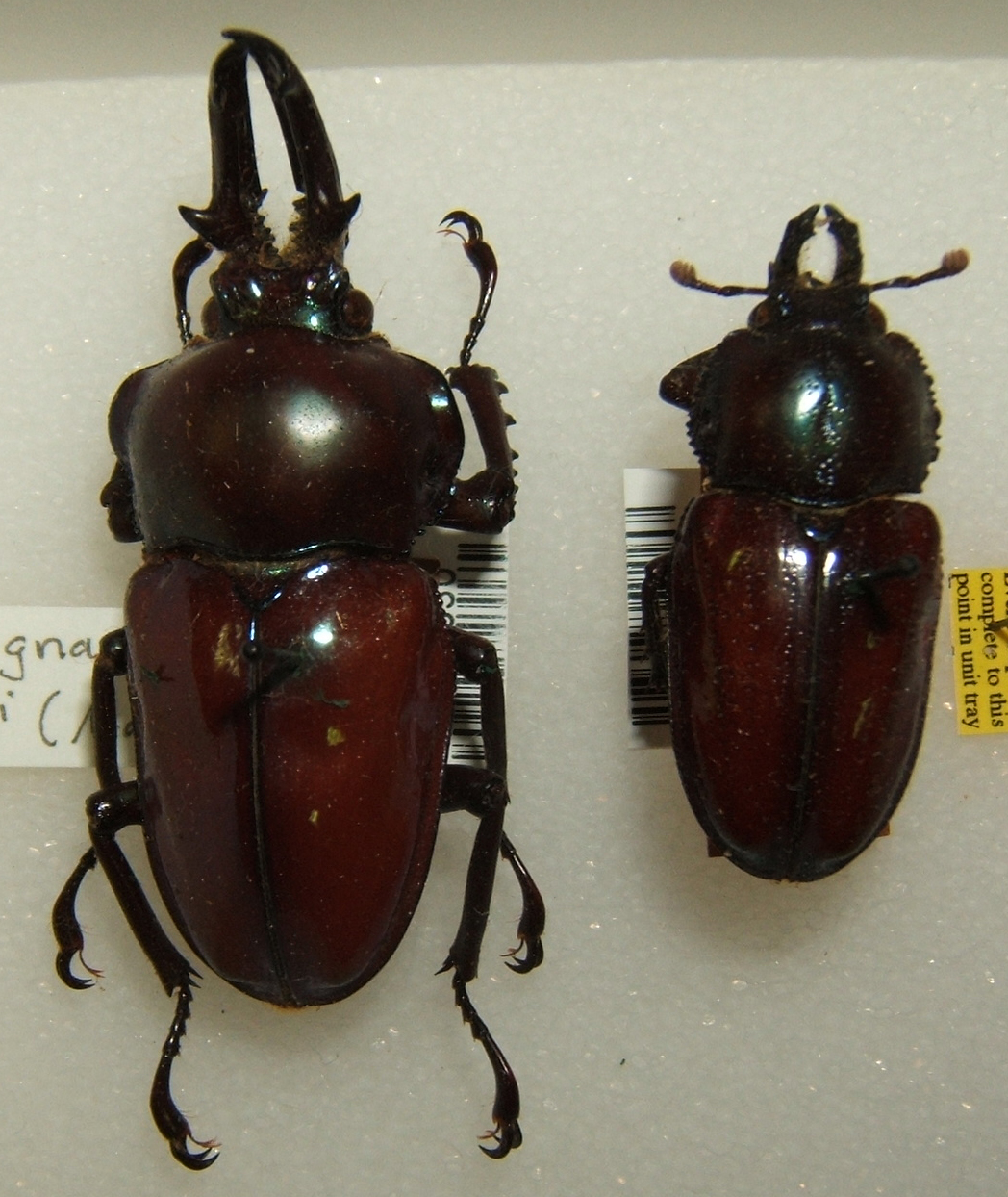
- Phalacrognathus muelleri, male (left) and female

Scientific classification
- Kingdom: Animalia
- Phylum: Arthropoda
- Clade: Pancrustacea
- Class: Insecta
- Order: Coleoptera
- Suborder: Polyphaga
- Infraorder: Scarabaeiformia
- Family: Lucanidae
- Subfamily: Lampriminae
- Genus: Phalacrognathus
- Species: P. muelleri

Binomial name
- Phalacrognathus muelleri Macleay, 1885

= Phalacrognathus muelleri =

Species of beetle

Phalacrognathus muelleri, colloquially known as the rainbow stag beetle, and also the king, magnificent or Mueller's stag beetle, is a species of beetle in the family Lucanidae. It is found in northern Queensland, Australia and New Guinea. It can come in red, green, black, and blue forms. It is the only species in its genus, Phalacrognathus, which is closely related to the genus Lamprima.

Phalacrognathus muelleri has been the official symbol of the Entomological Society of Queensland since 1973.

== Etymology ==
In 1885 the species was named Phalacrognathus muelleri by Sir William Macleay in honour of Baron Ferdinand von Mueller, the Victorian Government Botanist. The genus Phalacrognathus was created at the same time.

== Description ==
Males of Phalacrognathus muelleri are the largest members of the family Lucanidae in Australia. Males range from 24 to 70 mm (0.94 to 2.76 in) in length, whereas the smaller females range from 23 to 46 mm (0.91 to 1.81 in). their beautiful colours fade after death and are difficult to photograph.

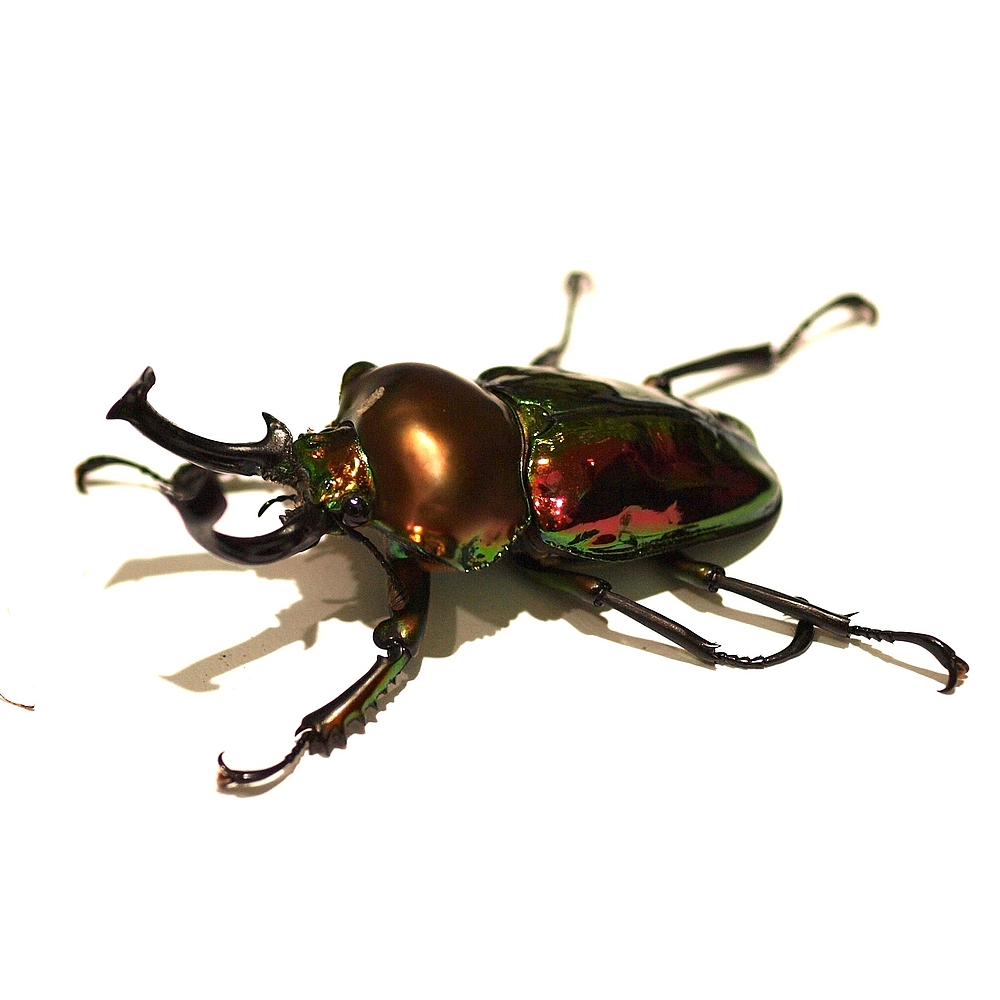
Male

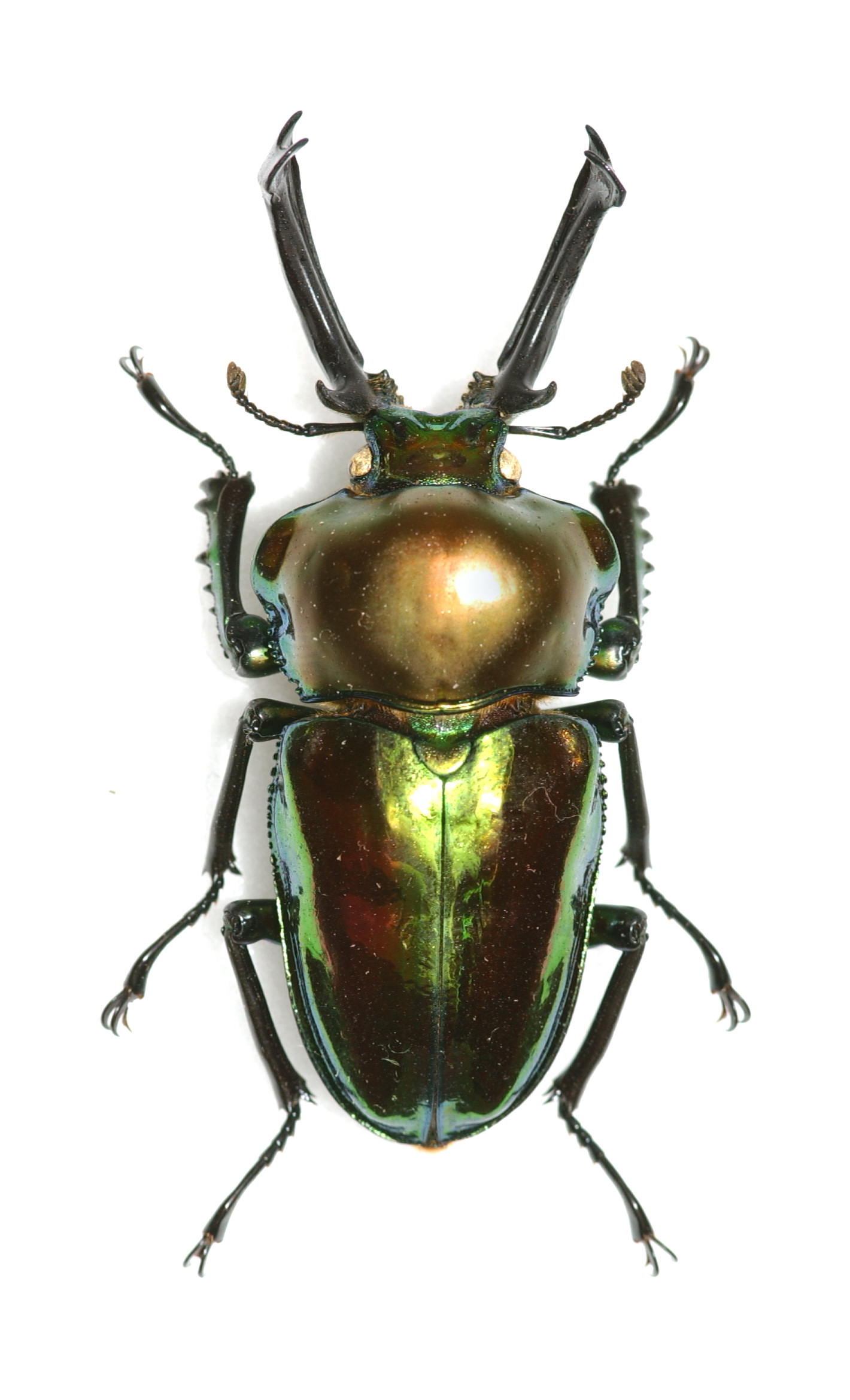
Male, another view (Musée d'Histoire Naturelle de Lille)

== Breeding ==
This species breeds in wet tropical areas. Up to 50 eggs can be laid by a female and these will take 10 to 14 days to hatch. The larva can be seen in the egg before emerging. The larvae are found in wet and rotting wood often in close proximity to white rot fungi and can take up to three years to mature.

Examples of fungi found proximate to breeding sites are: Ganoderma applanatum (Pers.) Patouillard, Nigrofomes melanoporus (Mont.) Murr., Phellinus nr. glaucescens (Petch) Ryvarden; Phellinus robustus (P. Karst) Baird, & Galz., Phellinus - 3 spp., and Pycnoporus sp.

== Subspecies ==
The species is divided into the following two subspecies:

- Phalacrognathus muelleri muelleri — Queensland, Australia
- Phalacrognathus muelleri fuscomicans — New Guinea
