= List of A Certain Scientific Railgun chapters =

Cover of the first volume of the A Certain Scientific Railgun manga released by ASCII Media Works on November 10, 2007, in Japan

The manga series A Certain Scientific Railgun is written by Kazuma Kamachi and illustrated by Motoi Fuyukawa. The manga is a spin-off of Kamachi's A Certain Magical Index light novel series published by ASCII Media Works. Taking place in the futuristic Academy City where students learn to become espers with various powers, the story follows Mikoto Misaka, an electromaster who is the third most powerful of only seven Level 5 espers, and her friends, taking place before and during the events of A Certain Magical Index.

The first chapter of Railgun was published in the April 2007 issue of ASCII Media Works' Dengeki Daioh shōnen manga magazine, and the succeeding chapters are serialized monthly. The first tankōbon volume was released by ASCII Media Works under their Dengeki Comics imprint on November 10, 2007; as of October 27, 2026, 21 volumes have been released. Seven Seas Entertainment licensed the manga in English and began releasing the series in North America starting with the first volume in June 2011. Railgun was adapted as a 24-episode anime television series by J.C.Staff, which aired in Japan between October 2009 and March 2010, followed by an original video animation on October 29, 2010. A second season, A Certain Scientific Railgun S, began airing in April 2013. A third season, A Certain Scientific Railgun T, premiered in January 2020.

== Volume list ==
No.	Original release date	Original ISBN	English release date	English ISBN
1	November 10, 2007	978-4-8402-4107-6	June 7, 2011	978-1-935934-00-4
1. "July 16" (七月十六日, "Shichi-gatsu Jū-roku-nichi"); 2. "July 17, Part 1" (七月十七日①, "Shichi-gatsu Jū-shichi-nichi 1"); 3. "July 17, Part 2" (七月十七日②, "Shichi-gatsu Jū-shichi-nichi 2"); 4. "July 18, Part 1" (七月十八日①, "Shichi-gatsu Jū-hachi-nichi 1"); 5. "July 18, Part 2" (七月十八日②, "Shichi-gatsu Jū-hachi-nichi 2"); 6. "July 19, Part 1" (七月十九日①, "Shichi-gatsu Jū-ku-nichi 1"); 7. "July 19, Part 2" (七月十九日②, "Shichi-gatsu Jū-ku-nichi 2")
Mikoto Misaka, Academy City's #3 Level 5 Electromaster, and Kuroko Shirai, Mikoto's kohai and Level 4 Teleport esper, meet up with Kazari Uiharu, Kuroko's colleague at Judgment. They witness a bank robbery, but Mikoto and Kuroko manage to stop the robbers. Following an argument with Kuroko and a case of mistaken identity, Mikoto experiences being a member of Judgment and is tasked to search for a lost bag. Afterwards, Mikoto runs into her self-appointed rival Toma Kamijo, the protagonist of A Certain Magical Index, and challenges him to a duel, but she still unable to win against his Imagine Breaker. As strange bombings take place, Mikoto accompanies Kazari and her classmate Ruiko Saten to a mall, where the bomber tried to attack Kazari for being a member of Judgment that he hated. The explosion is thwarted by the intervention of Tōma's power and the bomber is knocked down by Mikoto. She finds the bomber's power level unusual and begins to look into a rumor about "Level Upper", which could supposedly increase an esper's power. Mikoto tries to get some information out of a certain group of delinquents but is later interrupted by Tōma, who tried to save her from them. The following day, Mikoto learns that the bomber had fallen into a coma.
2	June 10, 2008	978-4-04-867146-0	September 27, 2011	978-1-935934-02-8
8. "July 20" (七月二十日, "Shichi-gatsu Hatsuka"); 9. "July 21, Part 1" (七月二十一日①, "Shichi-gatsu Ni-jū-ichi-nichi 1"); 10. "July 21, Part 2" (七月二十一日②, "Shichi-gatsu Ni-jū-ichi-nichi 2"); 11. "July 24, Part 1" (七月二十四日①, "Shichi-gatsu Ni-jū-yokka 1"); 12. "July 24, Part 2" (七月二十四日②, "Shichi-gatsu Ni-jū-yokka 2"); 13. "July 24, Part 3" (七月二十四日③, "Shichi-gatsu Ni-jū-yokka 3")
Researcher Harumi Kiyama is called in to investigate the surge of comatose students, and meets Mikoto and Kuroko. After she discovered a hidden link and downloaded the Level Upper in her MP3 player, Ruiko plans to reveal it to Kazari but she later backtracks when they discussed the repercussions of using it. Afterwards, Mikoto confronts Tōma, who recently met an English nun. While she thinks about using the Level Upper, Ruiko comes across a group of thugs currently trading with the device. Kuroko then arrives just as Ruiko gets in trouble with them. Kuroko confronts one of the Level Upper users but she struggles against him due to his light distortion ability. Finally, Kuroko defeats the thug when she tore down the abandoned building they were using during the fight. Later, Ruiko runs into her classmates and then introduces the Level Upper to them. A few days later, Ruiko calls Kazari and admits that she used the Level Upper. Kazari rushes in to Ruiko's apartment and finds her unconscious body. Later in a hospital, the frog-faced doctor reveals to Mikoto and Kuroko that Harumi possessed same brain waves with those in coma. Meanwhile, Kazari discovers theses about synesthesia in Harumi's office. Harumi then takes Kazari hostage and confesses that she used the Level Upper to connect user's brains in a single network, which would rival the Tree Diagram, Academy City's supercomputer. Anti-Skill tries to apprehend Harumi but she defeats them using multiple esper's abilities from the network. She dubs her newfound power "Multi-Skill" and fights Mikoto, who arrived at the scene.
3	February 27, 2009	978-4-04-867719-6	February 14, 2012	978-1-935934-12-7
14. "July 24, Part 4" (七月二十四日④, "Shichi-gatsu Ni-jū-yokka 4"); 15. "July 24, Part 5" (七月二十四日⑤, "Shichi-gatsu Ni-jū-yokka 5"); 16. "July 24, Part 6" (七月二十四日⑥, "Shichi-gatsu Ni-jū-yokka 6"); Special. "A Certain Student's Epilogue" (とある学徒の後日談集, "Toaru Gakuto no Epirōgu"); 17. "July 25" (七月二十五日, "Shichi-gatsu Ni-jū-go-nichi"); Special. "A Certain Two People's Job Training [Part 1]" (とある二人の新人研修[前篇], "Toaru Futari no Jobu Torēningu [Zenpen]"); Special. "A Certain Two People's Job Training [Part 2]" (とある二人の新人研修[後篇], "Toaru Futari no Jobu Torēningu [Kōhen]")
Mikoto manages to restrain Harumi after she dodged her multiple attacks, and electrocutes her in close range. This causes Mikoto to accidentally tap into Harumi's memories. It is revealed that Harumi was once a teacher to a group of children abandoned by their parents in Academy City called "Child Errors" and got involved in a failed experiment on them, becoming traumatized. Harumi vows to save them so she asked numerous times before to let her use the Tree Diagram but she was denied, leading her to create the Level Upper instead. Suddenly, an embryo-like being called "AIM Burst" is formed from Harumi's head due to her loss of control in the Level Upper's network, causing the comatose users to convulse. Kazari then uses the chip given by Harumi earlier to play its music file that would destroy the network. It is later heard by people, including Team ITEM, throughout Academy City and stops the victim's convulsions. Mikoto finally destroys the entity's core using her signature "Railgun". After the incident, Harumi is arrested and the comatose patients, including Ruiko, regain their consciousness. The following day, Mikoto and Kuroko clean a swimming pool as punishment from the Tokiwadai Dorm Supervisor for their missed curfew last night. Kuroko becomes jealous of Mikoto's kind treatment to one of the members of swimming team. The first special chapter narrates the realization of three former Level Upper users after they woke up from coma. The final two special chapters recount the first meeting of Kuroko and Kazari on a Judgment training grounds, and their involvement in a bank robbery which got Kazari into trouble due to Kuroko's thoughtlessness.
4	October 27, 2009	978-4-04-868169-8	May 8, 2012	978-1-935934-18-9
18. "August 10, Part 1" (八月十日①, "Hachi-gatsu Tōka 1"); 19. "August 10, Part 2" (八月十日②, "Hachi-gatsu Tōka 2"); 20. "August 11" (八月十一日, "Hachi-gatsu Jū-ichi-nichi"); 21. "August 15, Part 1" (八月十五日①, "Hachi-gatsu Jū-go-nichi 1"); 22. "August 15, Part 2" (八月十五日②, "Hachi-gatsu Jū-go-nichi 2"); 23. "August 15, Part 3" (八月十五日③, "Hachi-gatsu Jū-go-nichi 3")
Mikoto dreams about when she agreed a long time ago to give her DNA map for treating patients with muscular dystrophy. Later, Mikoto and Kuroko encounter people passing by an alleyway to search for cash cards. After she joined Ruiko in hunting those cards, Mikoto overhears a group of delinquents planning to follow the girl responsible for the cash cards. They confront her in a worn-out building but she is able to subdue them. Mikoto shows herself and gets identified by the girl as the "original". She reveals that placing the cash cards in alleyways would prevent a certain experiment, and destroys some evidences before leaving. A clueless Mikoto hacks the Bank, Academy City's database, for more information, and finds the girl's name as Shinobu Nunotaba and the medical research facility where she provided her DNA map. Mikoto infiltrates the facility and discovers the terminated project aimed to clone her called "Radio Noise Project". A relieved Mikoto then leaves the building when her clone arrived to delete the project's data. A few days later, Mikoto enjoys her free time with a group of children and later meets her clone named Misaka #9982. After she bonded with Mikoto, Misaka #9982 leaves for an experiment that would make Accelerator, Academy City's #1 Level 5, become Level 6 by killing 20,000 clones from the suspended project. Mikoto later witnesses in time just as Accelerator kills Misaka #9982.
5	June 26, 2010	978-4-04-868686-0	August 7, 2012	978-1-935934-78-3
24. "August 15, Part 4" (八月十五日④, "Hachi-gatsu Jū-go-nichi 4"); 25. "August 16" (八月十六日, "Hachi-gatsu Jū-roku-nichi"); 26. "August 19, Part 1" (八月十九日①, "Hachi-gatsu Jū-ku-nichi 1"); 27. "August 19, Part 2" (八月十九日②, "Hachi-gatsu Jū-ku-nichi 2"); 28. "August 19, Part 3" (八月十九日③, "Hachi-gatsu Jū-ku-nichi 3"); 29. "August 19, Part 4" (八月十九日④, "Hachi-gatsu Jū-ku-nichi 4"); 30. "August 19, Part 5" (八月十九日⑤, "Hachi-gatsu Jū-ku-nichi 5"); Special. "Wacky Judgement" (チキチキ風紀委員, "Chikichiki Jajjimento")
A furious Mikoto struggles to defeat Accelerator due to his vector control ability but their fight is later stopped by the other clones. Mikoto laments about the experiment but the emotionless clones tell her that they accepted their fate as lab rats. The following morning, a sleepless Mikoto is visited by Shinobu. She then reveals her involvement with the Level 6 Shift Project and abandonment of the project due to her changed perspective towards the clones. Afterwards, Mikoto begins to destroy the research facilities involved in the project. Due to huge damage the attacks caused on their experiment, the security supervisor calls in Team ITEM to protect the remaining facilities. Three days later, Mikoto infiltrates another research facility and gets confronted by ITEM member Frenda Seivelun. After she struggled against Frenda's explosives and hand-to-hand combat, Mikoto manages to subdue her. Academy City's #4 Level 5 and ITEM's leader Shizuri Mugino, and fellow member Rikō Takitsubo arrive just as Mikoto interrogates Frenda. Meanwhile, Shinobu enters a different research facility to install an emotion program to the clones but the installation is interrupted by their administrator Last Order, and gets knocked down by ITEM member Saiai Kinuhata. After she sent Frenda and Rikō to a retreat, Shizuri confronts Mikoto by herself. Despite being exhausted, Mikoto is able to destroy the research facility and defeat Shizuri. The following day, Mikoto deduces that the experiment would stop and later runs into Tōma near the vending machine. A special chapter contains funny short stories about Mikoto, Kuroko, Kazari, Judgment branch chief Mī Konori, Ruiko, Harumi, Misaka #9982, and Accelerator.
6	February 26, 2011	978-4-04-870350-5	December 11, 2012	978-1-937867-03-4
31. "August 20, Part 1" (八月二十日①, "Hachi-gatsu Hatsuka 1"); 32. "August 20, Part 2" (八月二十日②, "Hachi-gatsu Hatsuka 2"); 33. "August 21, Part 1" (八月二十一日①, "Hachi-gatsu Ni-jū-ichi-nichi 1"); 34. "August 21, Part 2" (八月二十一日②, "Hachi-gatsu Ni-jū-ichi-nichi 2"); 35. "August 21, Part 3" (八月二十一日③, "Hachi-gatsu Ni-jū-ichi-nichi 3"); 36. "August 21, Part 4" (八月二十一日④, "Hachi-gatsu Ni-jū-ichi-nichi 4"); 37. "August 21, Part 5" (八月二十一日⑤, "Hachi-gatsu Ni-jū-ichi-nichi 5")
Mikoto and Tōma's moment is interrupted by Kuroko's arrival, and a sudden appearance of Mikoto's clone named Misaka #10031. Mikoto becomes disgusted when she heard that the experiment continued, leading to a recent death of another clone. She further discovers that more research centers inherited the project and assumes that the experiment would not continue without the backing of Academy City itself. After she conversed with Tōma about her hatred towards machines being used by the people for their plans, Mikoto aims to disrupt Tree Diagram's calculations. Mikoto later arrives at District 23 and infiltrates the information reception center, where she learned about the destruction of Tree Diagram last month by an unknown high energy source. A desperate Mikoto attacks a nearby institute that inherited the experiment. Through a security camera footage, she then watches the death of Misaka #10031 from the hands of Accelerator. Back in the Tokiwadai dormitory, Kuroko receives an unexpected visit from Tōma. Later at a steel bridge, he confronts Mikoto with his discovery of the project data from her room. A hopeless Mikoto decides to let herself be killed by Accelerator, messing up the data calculations. Tōma prevents Mikoto's departure, causing him to be attacked by her but he decides not to fight back. After their standoff, Tōma plans to defeat Accelerator instead. He later arrives at the scene just as Accelerator prepares to kill Misaka #10032. Despite being overwhelmed by his vector attacks, Tōma manages to hit Accelerator while Mikoto watches from the distance. Suddenly, Accelerator counter-attacks Tōma with plasma. After Mikoto urged her to protect Tōma, Misaka #10032 commands the clones to reverse the city's wind turbine rotations.
7	December 17, 2011	978-4-04-870976-7	April 2, 2013	978-1-937867-21-8
38. "August 21, Part 6" (八月二十一日⑥, Hachi-gatsu Nijūichi-nichi 6); 39. "August 22 (八月二十二日, Hachi-gatsu Nijūni-nichi); Special. "The Iron Bridge is a Sign of Love" (鉄橋は恋の合図, Tekkyō wa Koi no Aizu); 40. "Faction, Part 1" (派閥①, Habatsu 1); 41. "Faction, Part 2" (派閥②, Habatsu 2); 42. "Rainbow's End"; 43. "Negotiation" (交渉, Kōshō); 44. "Commencement" (開会, Kaikai)
After his plasma formation dissipated, Accelerator focuses on Mikoto and Misaka #10032. As Accelerator charges towards the girls, a bloodied Tōma finally knocks him down unconscious. The following day, Mikoto visits Tōma in a hospital and learns from him that the experiment was discontinued. Mikoto and Misaka #10032 then share a sisterly bonding on the hospital grounds. A few days later, Mikoto runs into the grandson of Tokiwadai Middle School's chairman named Mitsuki Unabara, who stalked her since two days ago. As they walk together, Mikoto sees the newly transferred Tokiwadai student named Mitsuko Kōngo struggling to find her dormitory and takes its opportunity to break free from Mitsuki by helping her. Mikoto then tours Mitsuko around the School Garden and both share moments together. The next day, Mitsuko accidentally meets Ma'aya Awatsuki and Kinuho Wannai, who both suggested her to create her own clique. Kuroko then denounces Mitsuko's plan as she deduces that Mikoto would stop it. Mitsuko struggles to recruit other students but in the end, she befriends Ma'aya and Kinuho instead. In a library, Academy City's #5 Level 5 Misaki Shokuhō, who led the largest clique in the school, mistakenly warns Mikoto about planning to form a new clique. Meanwhile, Ruiko cheers up a gloomy Kazari by bringing her to the rainbow's extent, and they later pass by two students with a large forehead and a long black hair, who both discussed their preparations for the Daihasei Festival. The festival committee invites the Level 5 espers to demonstrate in the opening ceremony, but they get turned down by Accelerator, Academy City's #2 Level 5 Teitoku Kakine, Mikoto and Shizuri. Only Misaki and Academy City's #7 Level 5 Gunha Sogīta agree for the presentation. On the opening day of Daihaseisai, Gunha ad lib his forgotten athlete's pledge lines. The festival then begins with a three-legged race that was participated by Mikoto and Mitsuko. Meanwhile, Ruiko runs into someone having trouble using a unique phone. A special chapter shows Mikoto's visit at Ruiko's apartment as she seeks assistance in baking cookies for Tōma, who preferred them to be handmade rather than her recent purchased expensive ones. Afterwards, Mikoto meets a newly discharged Tōma on the bridge and struggles to give the baked cookies.
8	October 27, 2012	978-4-04-891101-6	August 6, 2013	978-1-937867-39-3
45. "Ambush" (伏兵, Fukuhei); 46. "Quickening" (胎動, Taidō); 47. "Encounter" (遭遇, Sōgū); 48. "Erosion" (浸蝕, Shinshoku); 49. "Trust" (信頼, Shinrai); 50. "Outbreak" (開戦, Kaisen); 51. "Analysis" (解析, Kaiseki); 52. "Darkness" (暗部, Anbu)
Misaka #10032 watches the ongoing events of Daihaseisai when she was mistakenly dragged to compete in the Balloon Hunter game. The opposing team is in advantage thanks to Yoshio Baba's intel of the participating Tokiwadai student's abilities and weaknesses. Misaka #10032 manages to last long in the game until she gets bitten by a robotic mosquito released by Yoshio. Despite losing the match, Mikoto is relieved that Misaka #10032 enjoyed playing on her behalf. After Mikoto left her with food stubs, Misaka #10032 suddenly collapses, and is later found by Misaki and her informant. Mikoto joins her mother Misuzu Misaka for lunch, and later meets Tōma and Misaki while trying to buy drinks. Meanwhile, Ruiko is looking for information about the mysterious Shadow Metal that can be produced from multiple espers clashing. As she searches the metal on an open field in District 18, Ruiko then gets apprehended by the festival cleanup security but she is later saved by Mikoto, who both got reprimanded for trespassing. Back in the Judgment office, Kazari finds the strange website Ruiko mentioned with cataloged urban legends like the Shadow Metal and stumbles on a report about a building called "Exterior". The information is then shown deleted while Kazari tells a returning Ruiko that the website was unsearchable. The following day, Mikoto learns from Kinuho that Misaka #10032 did not return her borrowed PE uniform after the match. Deducing that she was gone missing, Mikoto searches for Misaka #10032's whereabouts and confronts the EMTs she saw in the security footage loading her unconscious body in their ambulance, but they cannot recall the events surrounding the victim's status. After the contention, Mikoto is escorted by Tokiwadai teacher Watanabe to Misaki's clique for safeguard. She later sees Kuroko, Kazari and Ruiko passing by, and plans to seek their assistance but they retort her due to their altered memories about her. During their Balloon Sandwich match, Mitsuko agrees to help Mikoto find her missing "twin sister". Mitsuko then investigates Misaka #10032's last known location and finds her pet black cat. Later, she is approached by Yoshio to obtain information about the clone's location. A fight between them ensues until Mitsuko gets beaten down by his robotic dogs, after she was bitten by a robotic mosquito. Ruiko, Ma'aya, and Kinuho suddenly arrive in time to save her. After they sent Ruiko carrying an unconscious Mitsuko to safety, Ma'aya and Kinuho battle Yoshio's robotic dogs. Mikoto soon sees Mitsuko being admitted in a hospital and becomes infuriated. Meanwhile, Ma'aya and Kinuho manage to defeat Yoshio due to his miscalculation of their abilities. A vengeful Yoshio releases his giant robotic mantis but it is destroyed by Mikoto, who arrived at his hideout. She then boldy warns him not to harm her friends anymore.
9	August 27, 2013	978-4-04-891844-2	April 15, 2014	978-1-937867-79-9
53. "Defect" (瑕疵, Kashi); 54. "Cooperation" (連携, Renkei); 55. "In the Same Boat" (同舟, Dōshū); 56. "Dividing and Advancing" (分進, Bunshin); 57. "Search" (捜索, Sōsaku); 58. "Doubt" (疑心, Gishin); 59. "Recollection" (追憶, Tsuioku); 60. "Friends" (友達, Tomodachi); 61. "SYSTEM"
With the help of an esper that could tap into the cat's memories, Ruiko, Ma'aya and Kinuho learn that there were a tall, blonde-haired man, who mentioned the Latin phrase Auribus oculi fideliores sunt ('The eyes are more trustworthy than the ears'), and a girl present on the site where Misaka #10032 was last seen. Ruiko then calls Mikoto and wants to meet her up to rely that information. Meanwhile, Mikoto is approached by Mitori Kōzaku and her liquid metal puppet, who both took unconscious Kazari and Misuzu hostage in exchange for information about the location of the remaining clones in Academy City. Mikoto successfully rescues both of them with the help of Kuroko, who arrived at the scene. Back in the Judgment office, Ruiko tells Mikoto that the Latin phrase turned out to be the urban legends website she and Kazari looked up before. Deducing that the information and Kazari's memory of it were deleted by Misaki, Mikoto restores the website in Kazari's computer and discovers a photo of the Exterior with Misaki on it. As she heads to its location at District 2, Mikoto encounters Misaki and learns that she purposely hid Misaka #10032 in that building for protection against someone's plan of using the Misaka Network through her. Misaki further reveals that she altered Kuruko, Kazari, and Ruiko's memories about Mikoto for their safety. They arrive at District 9 to confront the perpetrator named Gensei Kihara, who masterminded the Level 6 Shift Project, but they capture an imposter instead. When they visited the Bank, Kuroko and Kazari learn that Mitori was declared dead 2 months ago. After she met Tōma during his Borrowing Race match, Ruiko investigates an abandoned liquid metal production facility where she got into trouble with Mitori's liquid metal puppet but she is then saved by Xochitl, a MEMBER operative. Xochitl prepares to attack the liquid metal puppet after she learned from MEMBER leader Professor that she betrayed them for working with an outside client, but Mitori decides to retreat. Meanwhile, Mikoto and Misaki drive back to the Exterior after the latter learned from the imposter's memories that Gensei found out about the building. Misaki then recounts her past involvement with Dolly, Mikoto's prototype clone, and manipulation of the Exterior Project researchers to avoid its leakage. Tōma later finds Xochitl and Ruiko to return Ruiko's luck charm he used in the game, and learns from Xochitl that Mitori and her client Gensei wanted to use Mikoto in their plans. Back in the Exterior, Misaki reveals to Mikoto that the building stored her cultivated brain's cerebral cortex for the amplification of her Mental Out's power. Gensei then arrives and is able to send a virus to the Misaka Network through Misaka #10032, which would initiate his plan of making Mikoto a Level 6 esper.
10	July 26, 2014	978-4-04-866698-5	April 21, 2015	978-1-62692-039-2
62. "Joining the Battle" (参戦, Sansen); 63. "Chaos" (渾沌, Konton); 64. "Resistance" (抗戦, Kōsen); 65. "Defeat" (敗北, Haiboku) (Note: When released in tankōbon 10, magazine chapters 65 - "Surrounded" (包囲, Hōi), 66 - "Preparations" (仕込, Shikomi), and 67 - "Seeing the Truth" (看破, Kanpa) were combined to be tankōbon chapter 65 - "Defeat" (敗北, Haiboku).); 66. "Miscalculation" (誤算, Gosan) (Note: When released in tankōbon 10, magazine chapters 68-71 were updated to be tankōbon chapters 66-69.); 67. "Right Hand" (右手, Migite); 68. "Dolly" (DOLLY); 69. "Festival's End" (閉会, Heikai); 70. "Promise" (約束, Yakusoku) (Note: This chapter was not serialized in the magazine.)
Mikoto begins her transformation into a Level 6 esper. Mitori then guilt-trips Mikoto to convince her in attacking the Windowless Building, where the Academy City's Board Chairman resided, but it takes no damage. Misaki sees the arrival of Tōma, and uses her powers to rewrite his brain with information about the ongoing events. Misaki then prepares to confront Gensei when she was attacked by Mitori's liquid metal puppet, but she is later saved by Kuroko. Meanwhile, Tōma counters Mikoto's attacks with his Imagine Breaker and is later joined by Gunha, who saw the disturbance from a distance. Back in the Exterior, Misaki sets out traps in the building to stop Gensei but they render useless against his Multi-Skill ability. Meanwhile, Kuroko tries to find Mitori and calls Kazari for assistance when she encountered her liquid metal puppet. Despite rendering Mitori's method of sensing her presence, Kuroko is wounded by her liquid metal puppet. Kazari and Ruiko then realize that there was a camera drone roaming around Kuruko's location. After she tried to use the graviton panel trap against Gensei, Misaki is subdued by him then he acquires the Exterior's limiter release code from her, but he discovers that he entered a self-destruct code instead. In the sewer where she hid, Mitori sees Kuroko's "death" from her liquid metal puppet's attack via camera footage on her tablet, but she is later surprised by Kuroko and realizes that the broadcast was fake. Kuroko then manages to defeat her. After the Exterior's control over the Misaka Network was destroyed, Mikoto regains her senses and sees Tōma attempting to subdue her unstable power. His right arm suddenly detaches from his body, unleashing dragons that stopped Mikoto's complete transformation. At the end of Daihaseisai, Ruiko manages to get Mikoto dance with Tōma. Back in the sewer, a defeated Mitori recounts her time with Dolly and hatred towards Academy City's Board of Directors for using them as lab rats. Misaki then arrives and tells her that she found out about Dolly's memory transfer to another clone after her original body died. They arrive at the facility where Dolly's new body was confined and have an emotional reunion.
11	October 27, 2015	978-4-04-865431-9	June 28, 2016	978-1-62692-216-7
71. "Indian Poker" (インディアンポーカー, Indian Pōkā); 72. "BLAU"; 73. "Observation" (注視, Chūshi); Special. "A Certain Young Boy's Episode" (とある少年の幕間挿話(エピソード), Toaru Shōnen no Episōdo); 74. "Precognition" (予知, Yochi); 75. "Prevention" (阻止, Soshi); 76. "Selfishness" (我儘, Wagamama); 77. "Dreams" (夢, Yume); 78. "Breasts" (胸, Mune); 79. "Revelation" (啓示, Keiji)
After the festival, Mikoto receives an Indian poker card from Junko Hokaze, which allowed you to experience a dream of someone else. Later night, Mikoto uses the card and dreams about her favorite mascot Gekota, but she then shares the moments with Misaki, becoming a terrible dream for her. The following day, Junko invites Mikoto for a tea with Misaki to deepen their friendship when they eavesdropped a certain group talking to a blue-haired boy about their experiences of using his Indian poker cards. Mikoto and Misaki then become furious after they overheard him presenting cards that could give indecent dreams about the two. Meanwhile, Kazari mentions to Kuroko about a treasure hunting app that could predict future accidents by pointing the camera to a certain place. To test its legitimacy, Kuroko and Kazari observe a vending machine by the road. A few minutes later, they witness a car accident but Kuroko manages to save a student who was about to get hit near the vending machine. Deducing that the app creator would watch nearby during the chaos, Kuroko finds an elementary schooler named Shaei Miyama. Back in the Judgment office, Shaei explains that he created the app to find an esper who could change his destined predicted incidents. He demonstrates his power in front of them by using his instant camera that would produce a photo of an incident. The following days, Kuroko manages to prevent multiple tragic incidents from happening with the help of his ability. Shaei later provides a photo of a predicted incident that would happen on a park. With the help of other Judgment members, Kuroko and Kazari manage to set a perimeter around the place. As he continues to provide photos, Shaei's body collapses and is soon admitted in a hospital. Back at the park, the fire starts to spread around but Kuroko manages to teleport people away for safety. She later finds a plant ampoule to be the cause of fire. Meanwhile, Shaei gains consciousness and rushes back to tell them about his pet dog living in the park. Kuroko and Mī later manage to save the dog. The following day, Mikoto stops by an Indian poker card trader and plans to purchase one when the seller introduced a high-ranked card called the "Bust Upper". Saiai, who also aimed to purchase from the same trader, sets her eyes on it after she felt humiliation from Shiage Hamazura's comment about her inability to "grow". After their scuffle that caused the Bust Upper card to accidentally jumble among other cards, Mikoto and Saiai purchase all of them. They later experience dreams from a ninja, a researcher, a maid, a roadside artist, and a long, black-haired student. A crow suddenly snitches up the Bust Upper card while the girls dream with their picked cards. The bird then accidentally drops the card to a girl sitting under a tree after a calico cat scared off from behind. Mikoto and Saiai finally use up all the cards, and become disappointed for not finding the Bust Upper in the stack. Saiai returns in ITEM's hideout and receives an apology from Shiage, who clarified that he purchased a milk for her to grow taller. The following day, Kazari and Ruiko walk past a girl with large breasts. A special chapter narrates the meeting of Shaei and Awaki Musujime, who had her eyes set on him due to her shotacon behavior, in a bus stop.
12	November 26, 2016	978-4-04-892365-1	July 25, 2017	978-1-62692-447-5
80. "Strange Coincidence" (奇縁, Kien); 81. "Assault" (強襲, Kyōshū); 82. "Hunt" (遊猟, Yūryō); 83. "Ha det bra" (Note: When released in tankōbon 12, magazine chapters 83 - "Struggle to the Death" (死闘, Shitō) and 83.5 - "Regret" (残心, Zanshin) were combined to be tankōbon chapter 83 - "Ha det bra".); 84. "Game" (遊戯, Yūgi); 85. "Soul" (魂魄, Konpaku); 86. "Charade" (茶番, Chaban); 87. "Dispatch" (出動, Shutsudō); 88. "Heavy Blow" (痛撃, Tsūgeki)
Ruiko and Frenda become friends over their love of mackerel. The following day, Ruiko informs Frenda about her purchase of an Indian poker card that would teach her in grabbing smallest things with a chopstick. Ruiko's chat is intercepted by SCHOOL member Banka Yobō, who was tasked to look for information about the Tweezers. While window shopping, Frenda notices thugs kidnapping Ruiko. With Shiage's help, Frenda saves Ruiko from the kidnappers. Meanwhile, SCHOOL calls in their sniper Rakko Yumiya to track the two. Frenda gets shot from behind and later drags Ruiko inside a department store to escape from the unidentified attacker. After she got hit multiple times, Frenda decides to use Ruiko as a bait that would lure out the sniper. When Rakko reacted to Ruiko's faked doll bombs, Frenda attacks her from behind. A fight between them ensues until Frenda defeats Rakko. Meanwhile, Ruiko manages to escape, and later gets protection from Anti-Skill and Judgment with Kazari's help. While staying in an Anti-Skill facility, Ruiko receives a chat from Frenda, who told her that she would visit her for dinner in a week. Back in SCHOOL hideout, an injured Rakko wants to take revenge on Frenda but Teitoku sets her plan aside as he prepares to obtain the Tweezers with information from acquired Indian pocker cards. A week later, Ruiko receives no response from Frenda. Meanwhile, Mikoto has another encounter with Misaki, who read the Indian poker card trader's mind for a certain information and learned about her struggle to purchase the Bust Upper. Back in the Judgment office, Kuroko, Kazari, Mī, and their colleague begin their investigation on Indian poker cards because of its use to store classified information that might leaked out. Misaki then relies her information to Mikoto about Ryōko Kuriba, the creator of Indian poker cards who split herself into two then replaced the missing organs with cyborg parts. Misaki further explains that the research institution, where Ryōko worked as a cyborg researcher, wanted to experiment on the creation of soul. Mikoto agrees to help her and later infiltrates the institution, but she witnesses an explosion on top of the building and a cyborg Ryōko escaping from it. Mikoto and Misaki then visit the original Ryōko for more information. Ryōko explains that her counterpart, dubbed by researchers as the Doppelganger, gained a soul and believed to be a human despite being a cyborg. Meanwhile, Team Scavenger is tasked to capture the Doppelganger. Later, Ryōko is attacked by the Doppelganger but she manages to escape from her. She is then captured by Scavenger member Tarōmaru Seike when Mikoto showed up. Other members of Scavenger arrive to capture the Doppelganger but she counter-attacks them.
13	November 27, 2017	978-4-04-893425-1	June 26, 2018	978-1-62692-781-0
89. "Unlucky Day" (厄日, Yakubi); 90. "Deception" (欺瞞, Giman); 91. "Negotiation" (折衝, Sesshō); 92. "Colossus" (巨像, Kyozō); 93. "Sacrifice" (犠牲, Gisei); 94. "Conjecture" (推量, Suiryō); 95. "Original Intent" (初心, Shoshin); 96. "Reunion" (再会, Saikai) (Note: When released in tankōbon 13, magazine chapters 96 - "Rank" (位階, Ikai) and 97 - "Reunion" (再会, Saikai) were combined to be tankōbon chapter 96 - "Reunion" (再会, Saikai).)
Mikoto, who learned that Ryōko's actual goal in researching cyborg was to replace her mother's failing organ, helps her escape from Tarōmaru. A fight between the two ensues until Mikoto defeats Tarōmaru. Meanwhile, the defeated Scavengers manage to retreat and are surprised by Mikoto's arrival since they were traumatized fighting a Level 5 esper from their previous mission. Scavenger leader Rita Īzumi manages to get Mikoto's trust. Using Rita's ability, Mikoto finds the Doppelganger heading to a radar facility but she struggles in subduing her. Rita tricks Mikoto in altering the Doppelganger's course for her to head towards a warehouse, where Scavenger's client was waiting, near the radar facility. Scavenger member Itsuki Yakumaru evacuates Skill-Outs living near the area to make Mikoto believe that they were part of Judgment working with her. As Mikoto prepares to battle the Doppelganger, who formed a creature made of huge mass, Team Scavenger arrives inside the warehouse and forces their client to sign off on their mission form then they escape the incoming destruction. Meanwhile, Mikoto fights the Doppelganger's huge mass puppet with her own that was made of iron sands. The Doppelganger then uses multiple high-pressure gas holders as a threat against the populace for Mikoto to worn out her powers since she would use it in saving them from explosions. The following detonations cause Mikoto's iron sands to spread in the sky, revealing the airship that the Doppelganger needed for her goal. Back on the ground, Ryōko arrives to make negotiations and is abducted by the Doppelganger as she boards the airship. Ryōko proposes to the Doppelganger that she could erase her soul in 2 months using the Indian poker cards. She then throws herself out from the airship but she is saved by Scavengers. Mikoto boards the airship and deduces that the Doppelganger's desperation was not being a human but rather not having a soul. As she fights decoys the Doppelganger made, Mikoto realizes that she wanted to destroy the airship containing research data about her. In the aftermath of airship's destruction, Mikoto further discovers that the reason the Doppelganger went on rampage was to get herself be killed instead of further experiencing torment being soulless. Later, the chief researcher and Ryōko arrive then they find the destroyed Doppelganger. After he learned from Mikoto that he was unsuccessful in creating a soul, the delusional chief researcher takes Ryōko hostage and demands to reverse her statement. Ryōko then urges him to stop future research about the Doppelganger but she gets shot instead. The destroyed Doppelganger offers her cyborg parts as replacement to Ryōko's wounded organs. Meanwhile, a fleeing chief researcher gets brainwashed by Misaki to make him start his research from scratch. After the events surrounding the Doppelganger, Scavengers meet up to discuss their team's improvement when their liaison called. Rita demands to have something in return for not getting a payment from the previous mission. The liaison decides to return their ranks back normal. Meanwhile, Mikoto visits Ryōko in a hospital and learns from her that the Doppelganger was now residing in her dreams.
14	October 11, 2018	978-4-04-912146-9	August 20, 2019	978-1-64275-113-0
97. "Thoughtfulness" (心馳, Kokorobase); 98. "Declaration of War" (宣戦, Sensen); 99. "Beginning of Competition" (緒戦, Shosen); 100. "Iron Wall" (鉄壁, Teppeki); 101. "Director" (院長, Inchō); 102. "Poisoning" (蠱毒, Kodoku); 103. "Spy" (間者, Kanja); 104. "Hidden Soldiers" (潜兵, Senpei); 105. "Dark Horse" (大穴, Ōana); 106. "Release" (解放, Kaihō)
Kazari cheers up Ruiko, who was depressed for losing contact with Frenda, by bringing her to some urban legend sites. They later run into Mikoto and offer advice about her developed feelings towards Tōma. Some time later, Mikoto, Kuroko, Kazari and Ruiko join a jailbreaking event that was hosted by the director of a new-built, privatized juvenile hall named Ryōta Kyōgoku. The event begins and most participants get disqualified early on as they try to breach the outer wall. Kuroko teleports the three beyond some obstacles while Mitori is about to get hit by a guard robot when Dolly saved her in time. Mikoto and her friends reach the main gate when Mitsuko, Kinuho and Ma'aya arrived with a bundle of long logs in tow to be launched towards the wall, but they render useless against its counter-attack. Mikoto finally punctures the wall with assistance from Mitsuko and robot club members, while Shuri Ōmi and fellow ninjas manage to climb up the wall. The participants, including Team Scavenger, then penetrates the outer wall through the hole. Once inside, Mikoto and Kuroko find that they could not use their powers due to AIM Jammers surrounding the area. They later run into a quadrupedal guide robot with Ryōta's face. Other participants, including Mitori and Dolly, subdue Ryōta-faced guide robots as well. One group reaches an AIM Jammer location and tries to destroy it when wasp-liked robots suppressed them with sleeping drugs. On the other hand, Ayame Fusō defeats those same robots using her voice resonance but she later gets knocked down by one of it. Somewhere in the prison grounds, Shuri's group defeats some robot defenses using their ninja skills. Meanwhile, Mikoto and her friends safely arrive at a prison building thanks to Itsuki saving them in the shadows, but they realize that it was the wrong place. They finally arrive in the correct prison building where they would break out the prisoner that was needed for winning the event. Meanwhile, a small girl in baggy sleeves named Raifu Wanigawa is about to get attack by a guard robot when a masked hero named Shoubu Yamashiro saved her. Inside the building, Mitori and Dolly encounter a riot suppression gigapedes. Shuri manages to defeat one of them when it appeared in their location. She later sees Mikoto's group passing by, and decides to follow them for gathering information about Academy City's technology and its espers. As he accompanies Raifu, Shoubu gets electrocuted when he tried to protect her from another threat. Meanwhile, Mikoto and her friends find a certain group busting a door when one of them decided to use his power. His psychokinesis ability becomes unstable and sends scattered rubber bullets in a frenzy. Mikoto and Kuroko shield the others from stray attacks, but Shuri leaves them to rejoin her group after she got hit under her skirt by a rubber bullet. As they advance inside the building, Mikoto's group runs into Raifu and suddenly gets cornered by several robots, but Mikoto reveals that she hacked one of them prior entering the wall. The hacked robot destroys the others then it busts the door that would lead to lower levels. Mikoto's group runs into Mitsuko's team wearing absorbent material suits. They arrive at a prison cell and discover that the fake prisoner was missing. It is revealed that Kazari, who got separated from Mikoto's group while entering the wall's hole, hacked into the prison's system and broke out the fake prisoner all by herself. The event concludes with Kazari winning the price but she decides to donate the money for the expansion of Asunaro Park, where the Child Errors being taken care of. Back in the juvenile hall, Ryōta discovers that the real fake prisoner named Iizuka was tied up, therefore swapping her with an actual prisoner who Kazari broke out earlier. The head of security named Suzuran Aohoshi reveals herself to be one of the perpetrators and subdues him. Meanwhile, the actual prisoner named Kimi Shundan escapes by unleashing a dragon, similar to Tōma's, from her right hand. A member of Shuri's group named Saryō Tsurigane also reveals herself to be Kimi's associate. In an alleyway, Shoubu confronts Raifu after he sensed her malice since their meeting, but she manages to escape from him. Suzuran, Saryō, and Raifu then meet up with Kimi, who had her eyes set on Kazari.
15	October 10, 2019	978-4-04-912838-3	July 7, 2020	978-1-64505-231-9
107. "Growth" (化生, Kasei); 108. "Expectation" (思惑, Omowaku); 109. "Insanity" (風狂, Fūkyō); 110. "Wicked" (性悪, Shōwaru); 111. "True and False" (虚実, Kyojitsu); 112. "Discernment" (洞察, Dōsatsu); 113. "Crazed Love" (狂愛, Kyōai); 114. "Desperate Measures" (苦肉, Kuniku); 115. "Leap" (跳躍, Chōyaku)
Later night, Kazari is abducted from her room by Kimi's group after her phone call with Ruiko. Mikoto, Kuroko and Ruiko then give chase but Mikoto struggles to defeat Kimi because of her right hand's unleashed dragon, which she recognized it was from Tōma. Mikoto and Kuroko split up to pursue the kidnappers. Mikoto arrives in a multistorey car park, where she encountered Raifu. Their fight continues near Academy City's outer wall in District 11. Mikoto finally defeats Raifu after she struggled from her gravity manipulation ability. Meanwhile, Kuroko battles Saryō, who could sense changes in an esper's AIM diffusion field. Despite being wounded by her sword, Kuroko manages to defeat Saryō. Shuri watches them from a distance and decides to forgo their goal of pursuing Academy City's technology, after she learned that Saryō was involved in Dark May Project and its effect on her. On the other hand, Ruiko stays behind, and pretends to be the culprit of the recent incident involving Mikoto and Kimi. She is then brought in the privatized juvenile hall, where she believed Kazari was held in. After Anti-Skills questioned her, Ruiko is allowed to stay inside the facility then she sneaks past security.
16	October 26, 2020	978-4-04-913481-0	April 27, 2021	978-1-64505-987-5
116. "Trapped Rat" (窮鼠, Kyūso); 117. "Fixed Temperature" (恒温, Kōon); 118. "Darkness" (暗闇, Kurayami); 119. "Fall" (転落, Tenraku); 120. "Discovery" (看破, Kanpa); 121. "In Sync" (伝心, Denshin); 122. "Reproduction" (再現, Saigen); 123. "Strategy" (駆引, Kagehiki); 124. "Budding" (出芽, Shutsuga); 125. "Pride" (矜持, Kyōji); 126. "Black Hole" (黒洞, Kokutōtō); 127. "Upset" (番狂, Bankyō)
Ruiko arrives in a locker room and dons a security uniform. Inside a juvenile hall's room, Kimi reveals to Kazari that she planned in revealing Academy City's esper development program throughout the world with her hacking skills. After Kimi left her with three hypnotized guards, Kazari overheats a Josephson computer that would cause them to pass out except her because of her Thermal Hand power. Meanwhile, Kimi recalls her time in a power boosting lab with Saryō, Raifu and Honoka Shirakinu, who was killed during their escape. She then figures out about Kazari's escape. A blackout ensues inside the prison building while Kazari attempts to flee from it. Back on the prison grounds, Ruiko and several guards plan to ambush the intruder she identified as Kazari near an escape chute of the building. Kazari struggles to climb up an emergency wall ladder but she is rescued by Ruiko after she left her guard post. The two are later cornered by Kimi near the back gate when Mikoto showed up. A rematch between them follows until Mikoto manages to create an opening for Kazari and Ruiko's escape. It causes Ruiko to get wounded by Kimi's hypnotic feather attack. After Suzuran arrived to take the two away from the battlefield, Mikoto confronts Kimi about her hatred seeing a person protecting others. Meanwhile, Suzuran reveals to Kazari their true goal in abducting her and hands over a USB stick that contained Kimi's data from the lab. During their clash, Mikoto sees Kimi's deformed right arm with the dragon slowly taking over her body. Back in the prison control room, Kazari discovers from the decrypted data about Kimi's actual power of creating a black hole and how it is being used as energy source by the dragon. Kazari then changes her AIM diffusion field with the help of AIM Jammers to create a new power that would separate the dragon from Kimi.
17	February 26, 2022	978-4-04-914255-6	December 20, 2022	978-1-64827-574-6
128. "Penitence" (懺悔, Zange); 129. "Convictions" (信念, Shinnen); 130. "Recovery" (快気, Kaiki); 131. "Freshman" (一年, Ichi-Nen); 132. "Railgun" (超電磁砲(レールガン), Chō-Denjihō (Rērugan)); Special. "Encounter" (遭逢, Sōhō); Special. "Destiny" (因縁, In'nen); 133.1. "Family Status" (家格, Kakaku); 133.2. "Dispute" (抗爭, Hanzen); 134. "Spread" (延焼, Enshō); 135. "Backfire" (裏目, Urame); 136. "Harsh Words" (啖呵, Tanga)
With her newfound power, Kazari helps Mikoto in defeating Kimi. Kimi, Saryō, and Raifu are all later seen detained, with the latter getting visited by Shoubu, while Ryōta declines a lending company that shows interest in high-powered espers in his facility. He later learns of Saryō's escape, who then meets with Kuruwa for ninja training. As they recover in a hospital, Mikoto and her friends are visited by Mitsuko, Ma'aya, and Kinuho. One month since starting her first year at Tokiwadai Middle School, Mikoto meets Rurikakesu "Ruri" Shin'enkōji by the vending machine. She learns from her roommate, Kiyoshi Kessai, that there are three largest cliques in their school. Mikoto later encounters the clique leaders Danshan Sha, Reiri Hasekura, and Nagisa Mikagami. Reiri invites Mikoto for a duel but loses against her. After some time, Mikoto encounters Misaki after their rough first meeting last week and Kuroko bumps into Danshan looking for a way to the School Garden. Kasumi Enjō, a member of Reiri's clique, is suspected of attacking Tsukasa Kazan'in, a member of Nagisa's clique, after the latter disrespected the former's family, causing hostility among the two cliques. Mikoto and Ruri become involved after two members of Nagisa's clique attack Kiyoshi for being a member of Reiri's clique, while Danshan's clique suspects Misaki as the mastermind. Misaki is saved by Junko from being attacked by Danshan's clique members. Suika Yasutoba, a member of Reiri's clique, plans to bring down Nagisa's clique by attacking Nagisa and her followers Rina Kadosaka and Sena Sukezawa.
18	March 27, 2023	978-4-04-914959-3	January 9, 2024	979-8-88843-101-6
137. "Verbal Attack" (口撃, Kōgeki); 137.5 "Roommate" (寮友, Ryōyū); 138. "Confrontation" (対峙, Taiji); 139. "Extraordinary" (破格, Hakaku); 140. "Conversation" (対話, Taiwa); 141. "Friendship" (修好, Shūkō); 142. "Charge" (突貫, Tokkan); 143. "Clever" (怜悧, Reiri)
19	March 27, 2024	978-4-04-915665-2	February 11, 2025	979-8-89160-523-7
144. "Assessment" (品評, Hinpyō); 145. "Silver Whistle" (銀笛, Ginteki); 146. "Scandal" (醜聞, Shūbun); 147. "Adoptee" (養子, Yōshi); 148. "Toying With" (翻弄, Honrō); 149. "Crack Troops" (精兵, Seihei); 150. "Conjecture" (推察, Suisatsu); 151. "Graduation" (卒業, Sotsugyō); 152. "Chance Meeting" (邂逅, Kaikō)
20	June 26, 2025	978-4-04-916457-2	March 17, 2026	979-8-89765-321-8
153. "Start" (始動, Shidō); 154. "Mutual Affection" (相思, Sōshi); 155. "Gambit" (仕掛, Shikake); 156. "School" (学舎, Manabiya); 157. "Ruse" (詭謀, Kibō); 158. "Predicament" (窮境, Kyūkyō); 159. "Inherited Truth" (継志, Keishi); 160. "Danshan" (淡扇, Tanshan); 161. "The Normal Way" (常軌, Jōki); 162. "Choice" (選択, Sentaku); 162.5. "Dear Years" (いとしき歳月, Itoshiki Saigetsu)
21	October 27, 2026	978-4-04-952431-4	—	—

== Chapters not yet in tankōbon format ==
- 163. "In Her Heart" (胸衿, Kyōkin)
- 164. "Change of Heart" (変心, Henshin)
- 165. "Exchange" (応酬, Ōshū)
- 166. "Realization" (成就, Jōju)
- 167. "Home" (居所, Kyosho)
- 168. "After the Storm" (嵐の後, Arashi no Ato)
- 169. "Misaka Mikoto Onee-Sama" (御坂美琴お姉様, Misaka Mikoto Oneesama)
- 170. "Tokiwadai's Railgun" (常盤台の超電磁砲(レールガン), Tokiwadai no Rērugan)
