= Marine evacuation system =

Emergency exit device for ships

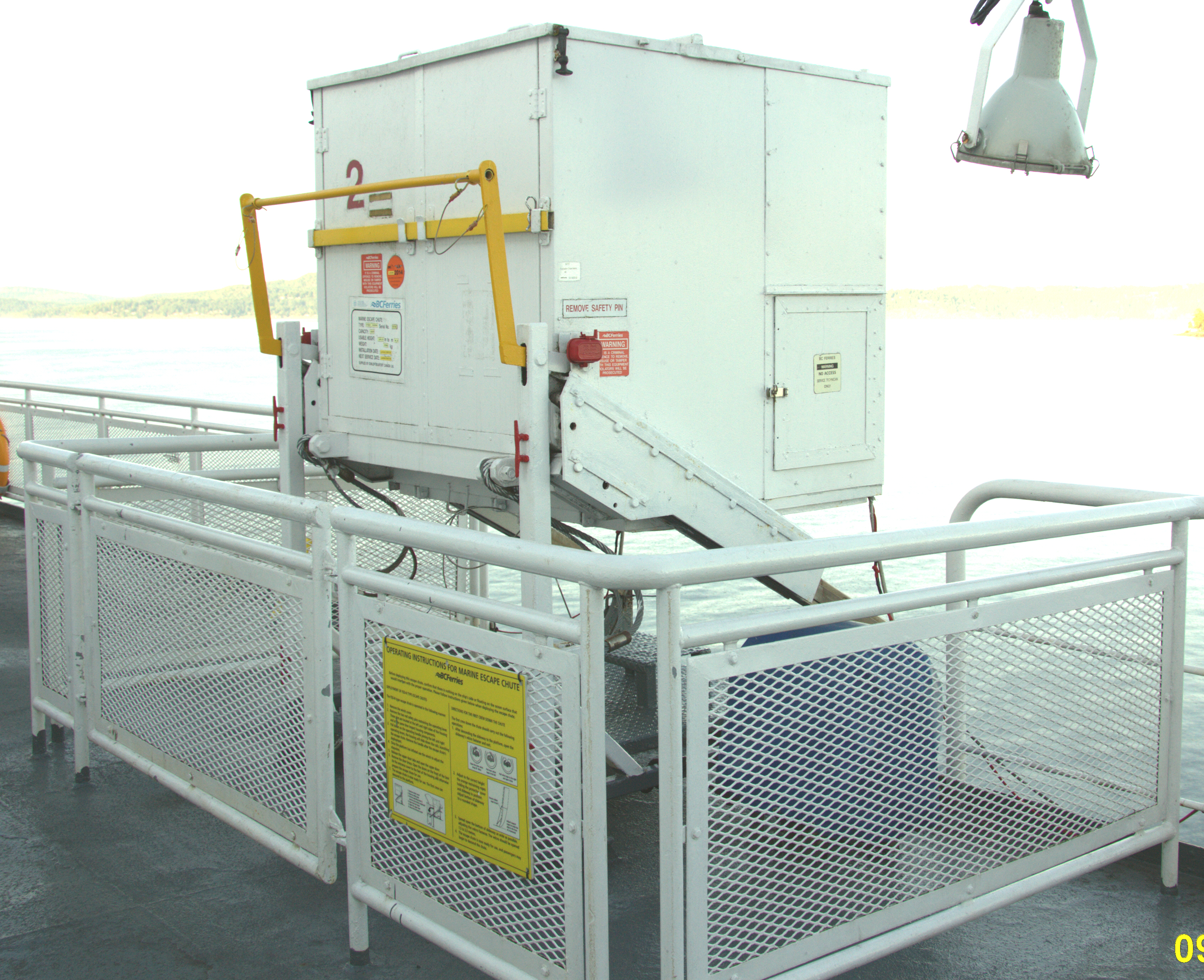
Marine escape chute on the Spirit of Vancouver Island in September 2013

A marine evacuation system (MES) is a lifesaving device found on many modern passenger ships or oil rigs consisting of an inflatable slide or escape chute where a passenger can evacuate straight into waiting life rafts. Developed in 1979 by RFD, a New Zealand–based company that distributes safety equipment; MES is replacing traditional davit-launched life rafts used on ships.

MESs are common on high speed craft, where weight and evacuation times must be kept to a minimum, although many conventional ferries and cruise ships are now fitting MESs to complement or replace lifeboats.

The main manufacturers of MES are Survitec Group (RFD Beaufort and Brude Safety) Zodiac, Viking, ALBE Engineering & Consulting GmbH in Germany and Liferaft Systems Australia. They take very little space on deck, positioned on the front of the embarkation deck and on the sides of the ship. MES requires little time and effort to assemble, which is crucial in times of emergency.

== Evacuation ==
MES has gained popularity over the past few decades due to its mass evacuation ability. It is one of the only life saving appliance (LSA) that can evacuate over 700 people in 30 minutes. It is a well-tested technology gaining vast popularity in the industry due to its ship safety enhancing capabilities in emergency situations. It has been tested in Beaufort Sea State 6 winds and 3, wave heights and the slide prototype has been tested in accordance with EU Directive of Marine Equipment 96/98/EC and IMO Resolution A689(17) as amended.

MES requires only one or two staff members to deploy. The chute automatically falls into the water where a life raft starts to inflate; the whole process takes approximately 90 seconds, with some systems claiming to fully inflate within one minute. Once the lifeboat has been inflated, people are asked to jump down through the air-cushioned chutes into the rafts, which can hold more than 700 people.

== Components ==
The MES consists of five components.

- Controls – used to initiate the device in an emergency situation.
- Stowage box – contains essentials for the evacuation, including the chute and the fixed appliances, such as seats, rails, etc. Composed of marine grade aluminum along with inflation cylinders, usually kept on the deck taking as little as 4 m^{2} of storage space. It is considered to be lightweight, weighing around 685 kg including the life rafts stored inside.
- Chute or Slide – attached to the ship and life rafts, it is stored in the stowage box. Inflatable slides are composed of polyurethane coated nylon fabrics making it sturdy. It ranges up to 13.6 m in height, including single and double evacuation slides depending on the vessels preference.
- Rafts – are the floatable boats used in an emergency event. Depending on the MES system, there are usually 1-4 rafts in the stowage box.
- Bowsing winch – in an electric system that is used to transport the raft from the ship to the side of the ship.

== Types of MES ==
- Chute and Dual Chute Systems – commonly used on large cruise ships, they take little space, and provide fast evacuation for large numbers of people.
- Mini Chute Systems – used by smaller vessels that have a low embarkation deck. It is light in weight and compact, therefore easily stored in the stowage box, and can be assembled anywhere on the vessel.
- Slide Systems – is an inflatable slide that attaches to the access point of the evacuation, similar to the ones on aircraft.
- Mini Slide Systems – used by ferries and yachts that have a low embarkation deck
- Direct boarding life rafts – used for vessels with low deck heights because it floats parallel to the vessel, requiring people to directly jump onto the raft. It is ideal for mass evacuations.
