= Chute (gravity) =

Vertical or inclined passage through which objects move by gravity

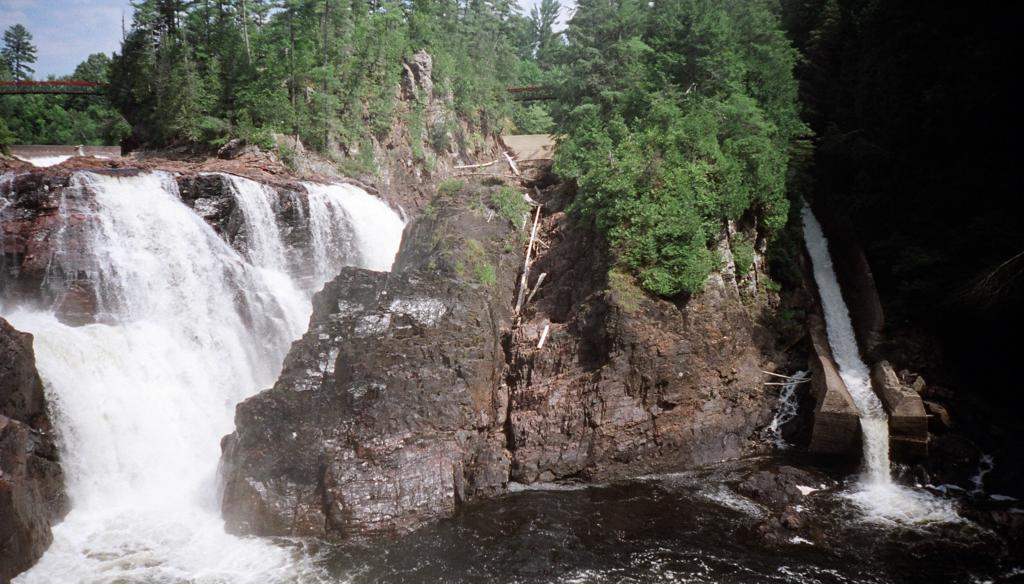
Natural chute (falls) on the left and man-made logging chute on the right on the Coulonge River in Quebec, Canada

A chute is a vertical or inclined plane, channel, or passage through which objects are moved by means of gravity.

== Landform ==
A chute, also known as a race, flume, cat, or river canyon, is a steep-sided passage through which water flows rapidly.

Akin to these, man-made chutes, such as the timber slide and log flume, were used in the logging industry to facilitate the downstream transportation of timber along rivers. These are no longer in common use. Man-made chutes may also be a feature of spillways on some dams. Some types of water supply and irrigation systems are gravity fed, hence chutes. These include aqueducts, puquios, and acequias.

== Building chutes ==
Chutes are in common use in tall buildings to allow fast and efficient transport of items and materials from the upper floors to a central location on one of the lower floors, especially the basement. Chutes may be of a round, square or rectangular cross-section at the top and/or the bottom.

- Laundry chutes in hotels are placed on each floor to allow the expedient transfer and collection of dirty laundry to the hotel's laundry facility without having to use elevators or stairs. These chutes are generally constructed from aluminium or stainless steel sections, welded together into a continuous section to avoid any extruding parts or sharp, rough edges that may tear or damage the materials.

Home laundry chutes are typically found in homes with basement laundry to allow the collection of all household members' dirty laundry, conveniently near the bedrooms and laundry facilities, without the constant transport of laundry bins from floor-to-floor, room-to-room or up and down stairs or lifts. Home laundry chutes may be less common than previously due to building codes or concern regarding fireblocking, the prevention of fire from spreading from floor-to-floor, as well as child safety. However, construction including cabinets, doors, lids, and locks may make both risks significantly less than with simple stairwells.

- Refuse chutes, rubbish chutes, or garbage chutes are common in high-rise apartment buildings and are used to collect all the building's waste in one place. The bottom end of the chute is normally positioned directly above a large, open-topped waste container, but sometimes may also include a mechanical waste compactor. This makes garbage collection and disposal faster and more efficient, however it can be a potential hygiene risk, health and safety and fire hazard due to garbage and waste residue left stuck inside the chutes, which must be cleaned regularly.
- Mail chutes are used in some buildings to collect and store the occupants' mail. A notable example is the Asia Insurance Building.
- Escape chutes are used and proposed for use in evacuation of mining equipment and high-rise buildings.
- Construction chutes are used to safely remove rubble and similar demolition materials and waste from taller buildings. These temporary structures typically consist of a chain of cylindrical or conical plastic tubes, each fitted into the top of the one below and tied together, usually with a strong metal chain. Together, they form a long flexible tube, which is hung down the side of the building. The lower end of this tube is placed over a skip or other receptacle, and waste materials are dropped from the top. Heavy duty steel chutes may also be used when the waste being deposited is heavy duty and in cases of particularly taller buildings.

An elevator is not a chute, as it is not moved under gravity.

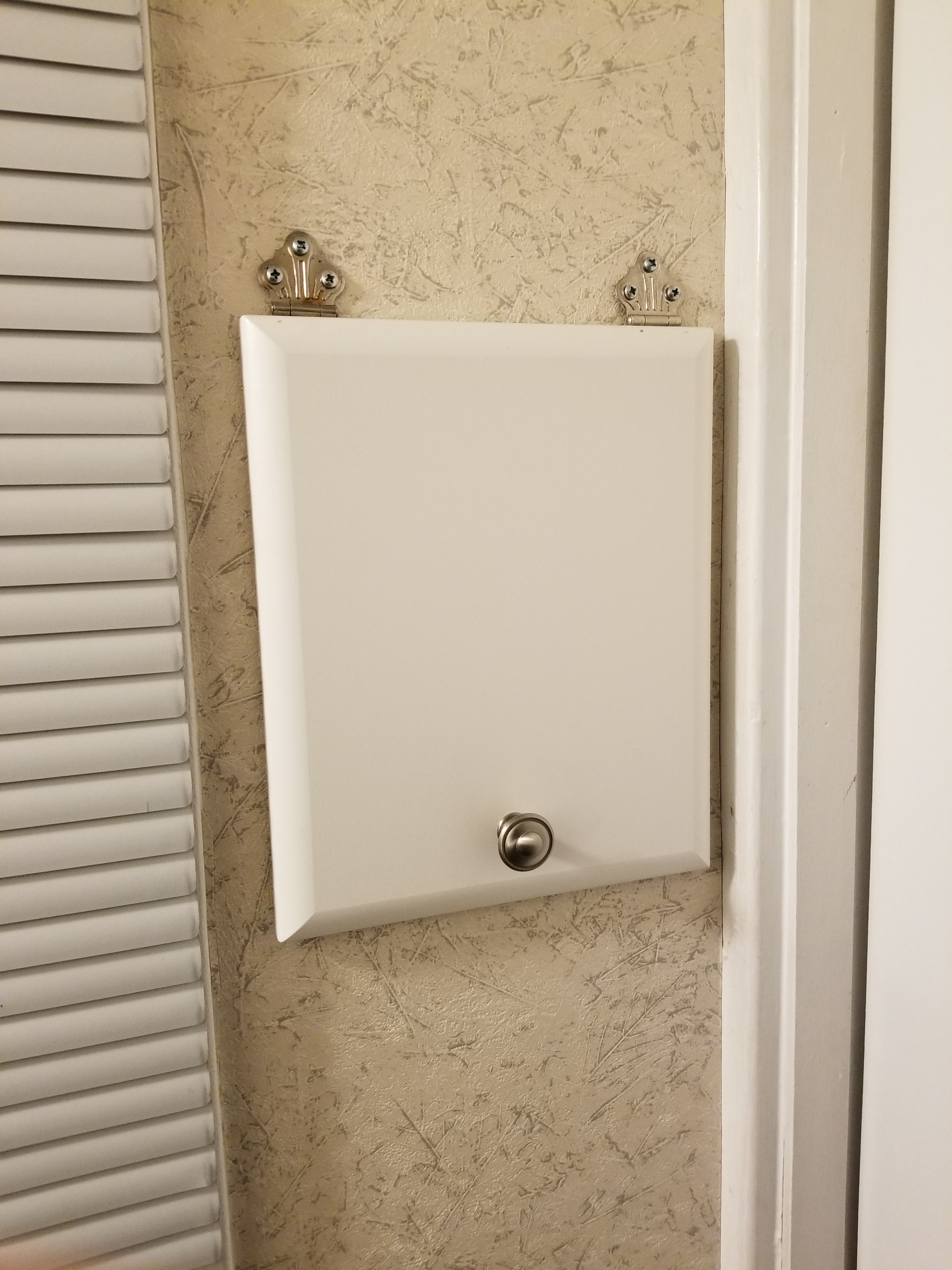
Home laundry chute

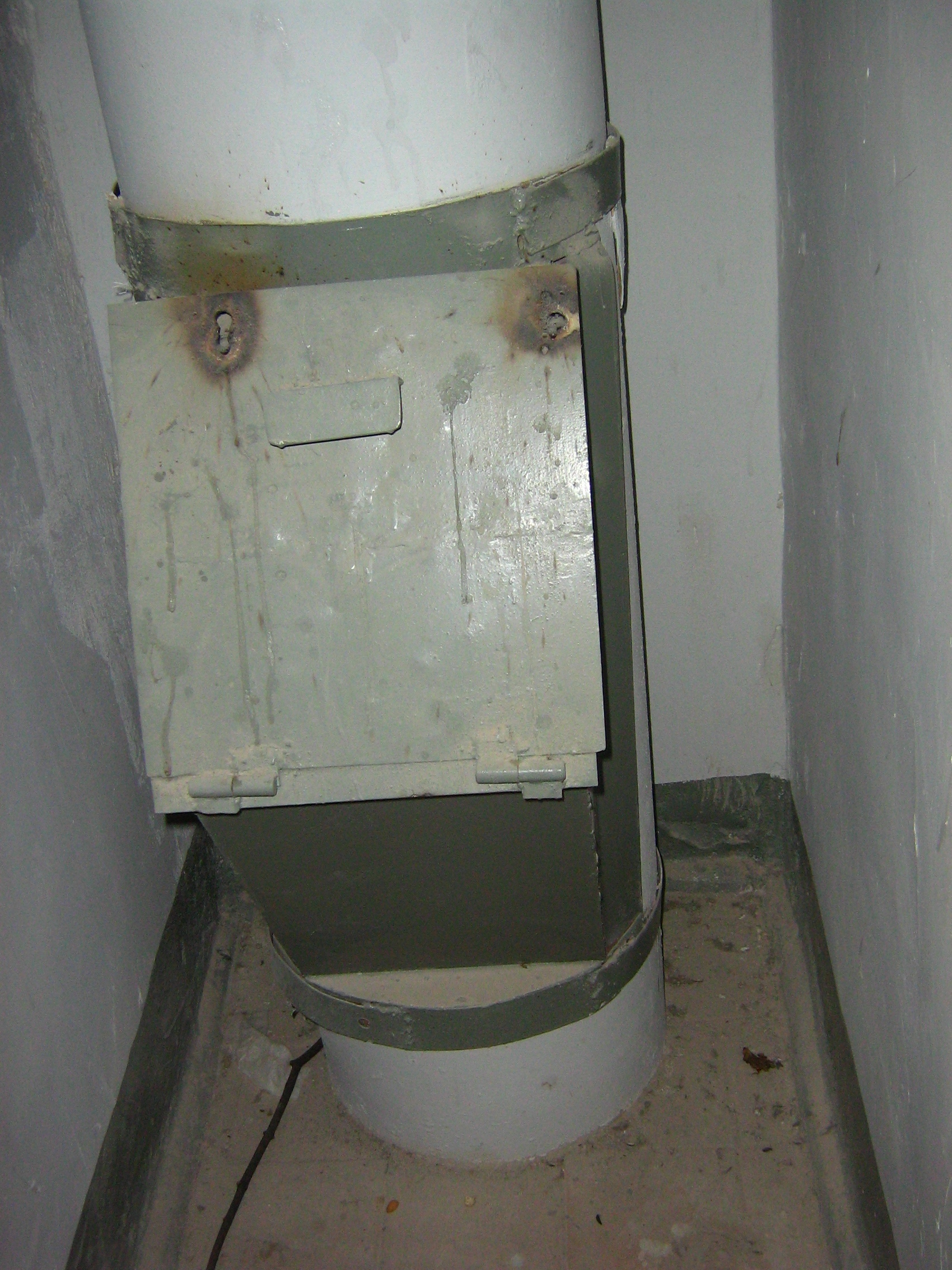
Garbage chute

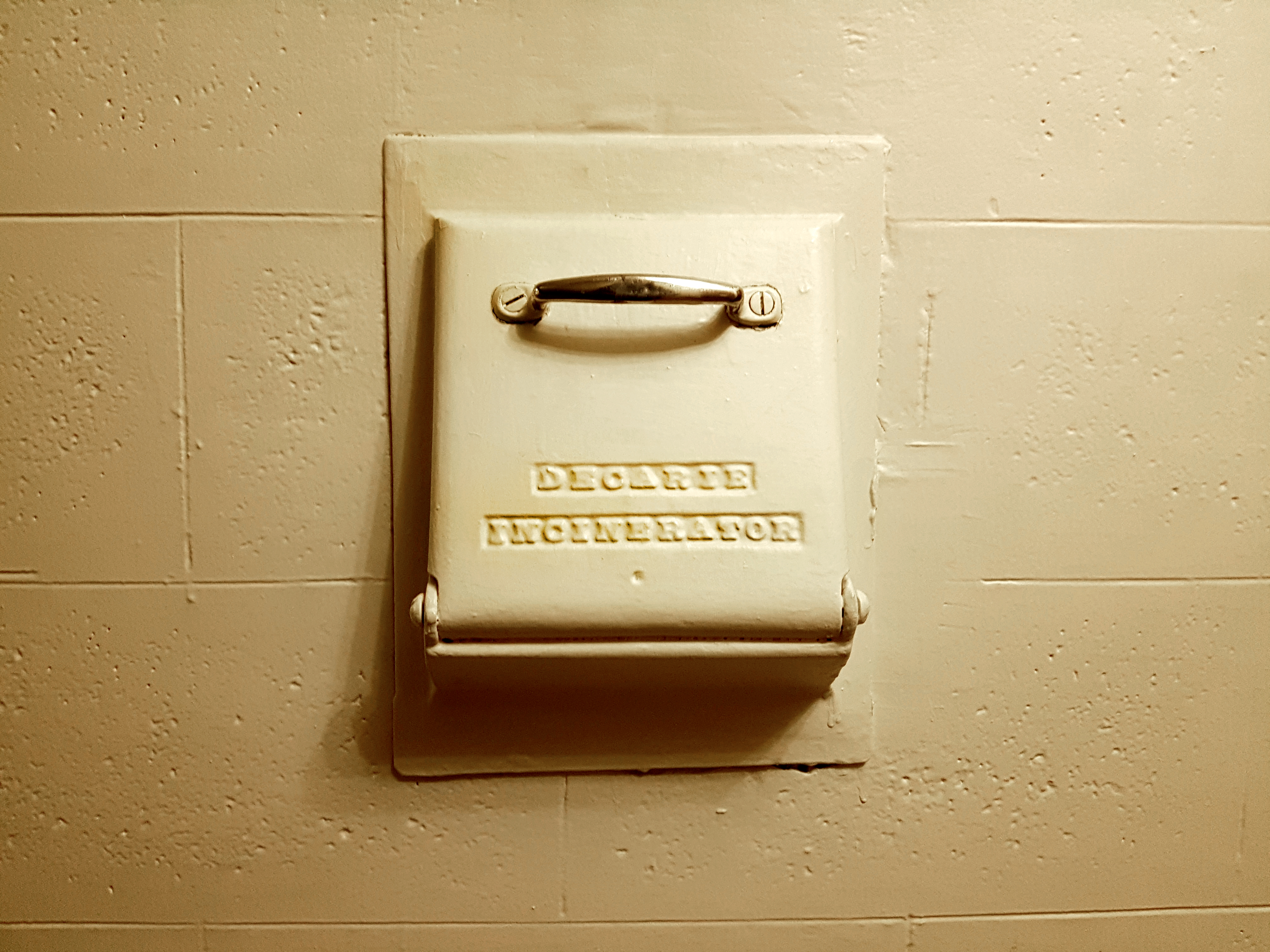
Waste incinerator chute, no longer in use

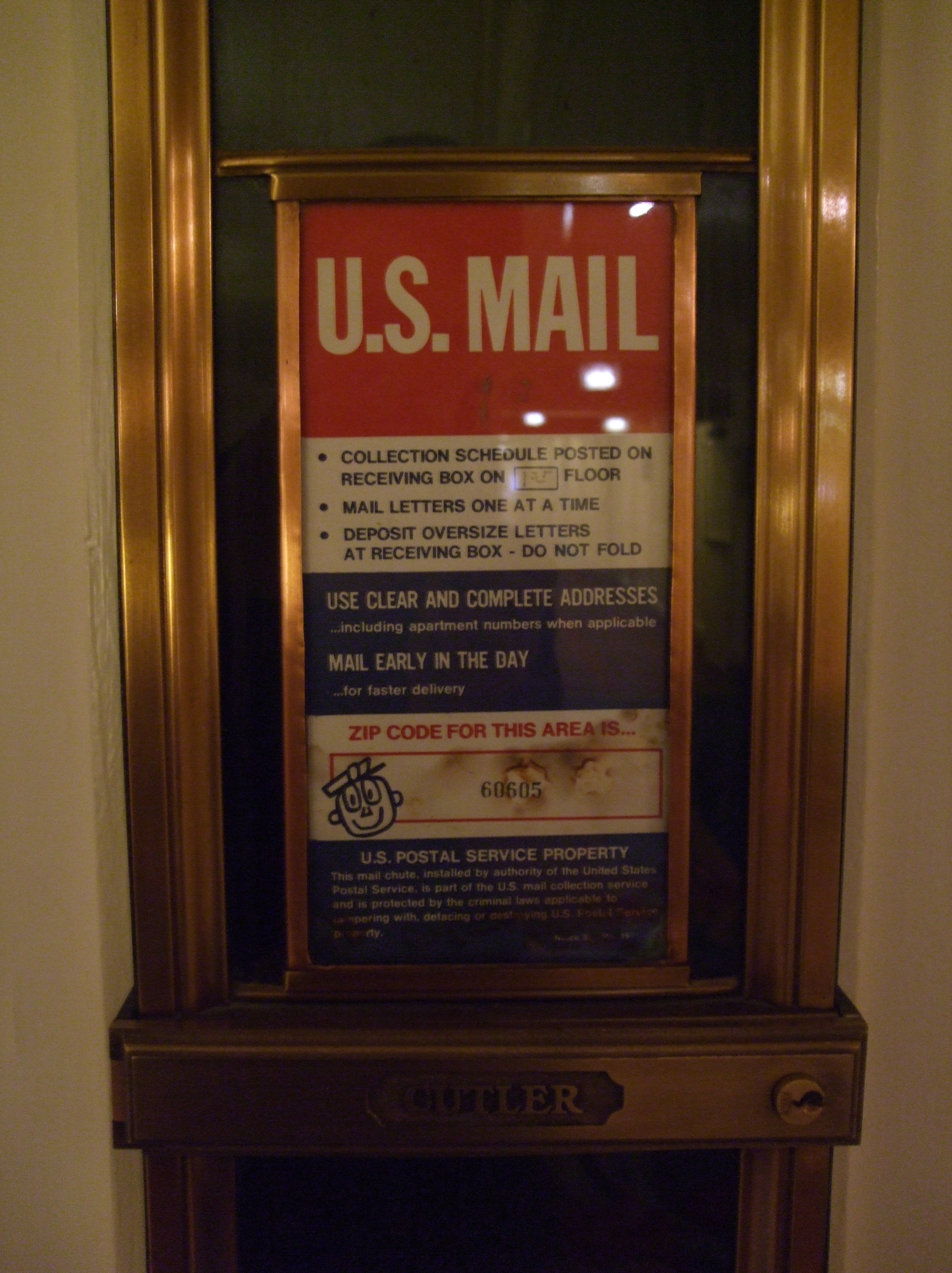
Mail chute

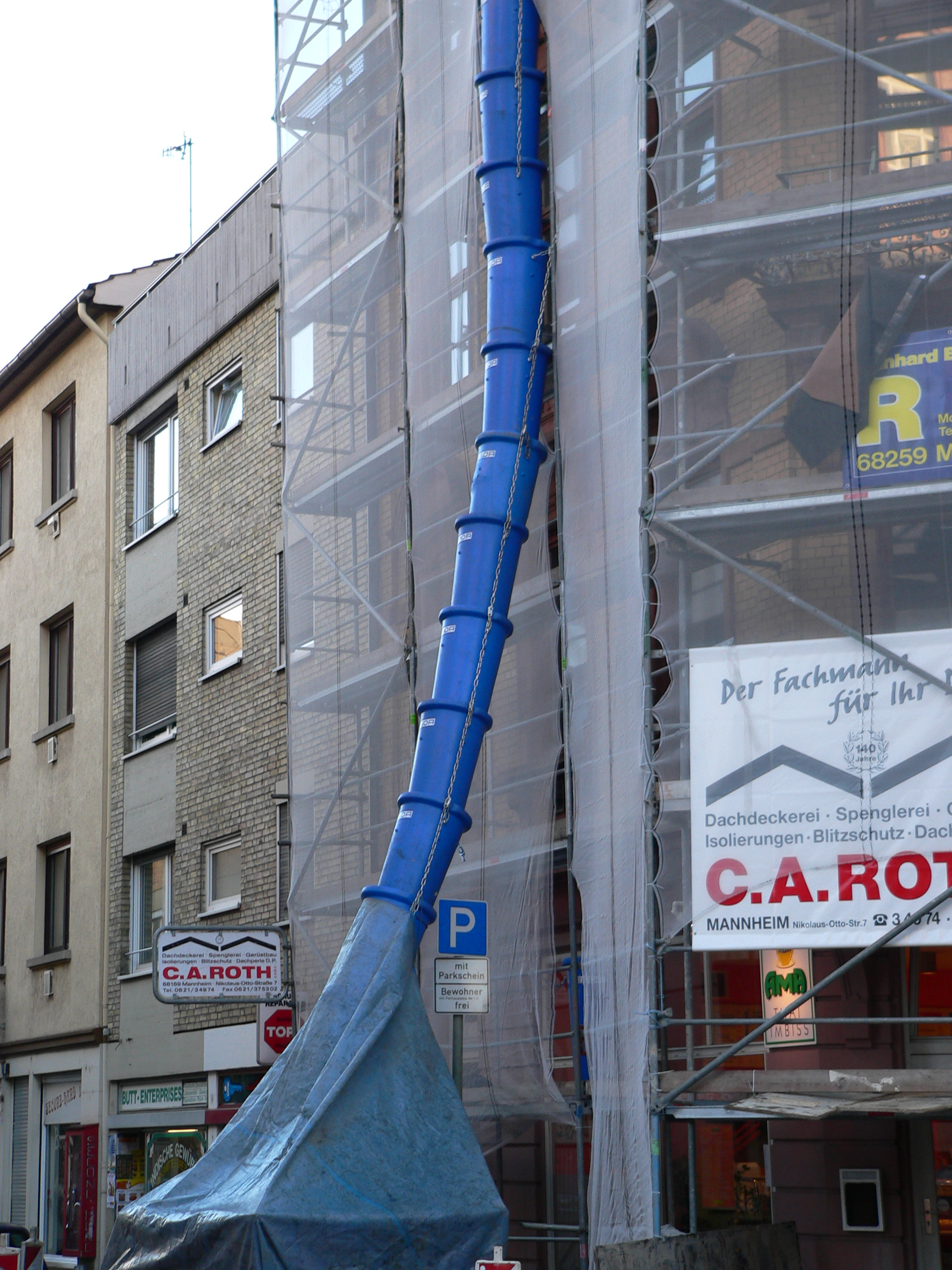
Construction chute

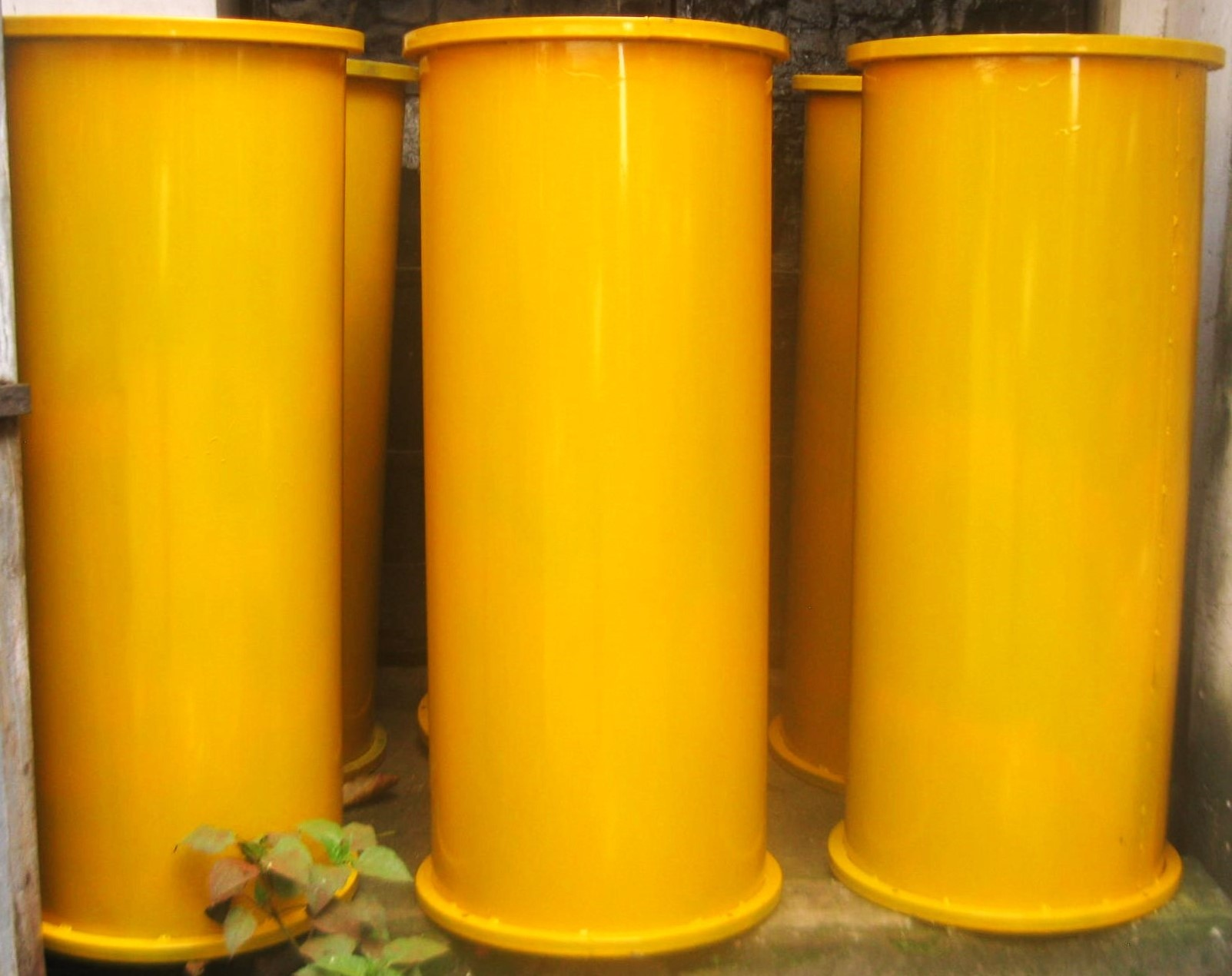
Circular garbage chute

== Chutes in transportation ==
Goust, a hamlet in southwestern France, is notable for its mountainside chute that is used to transport coffins.

Chutes are also found in:

- Hopper cars
- Hopper barges

== Aircraft escape chutes ==
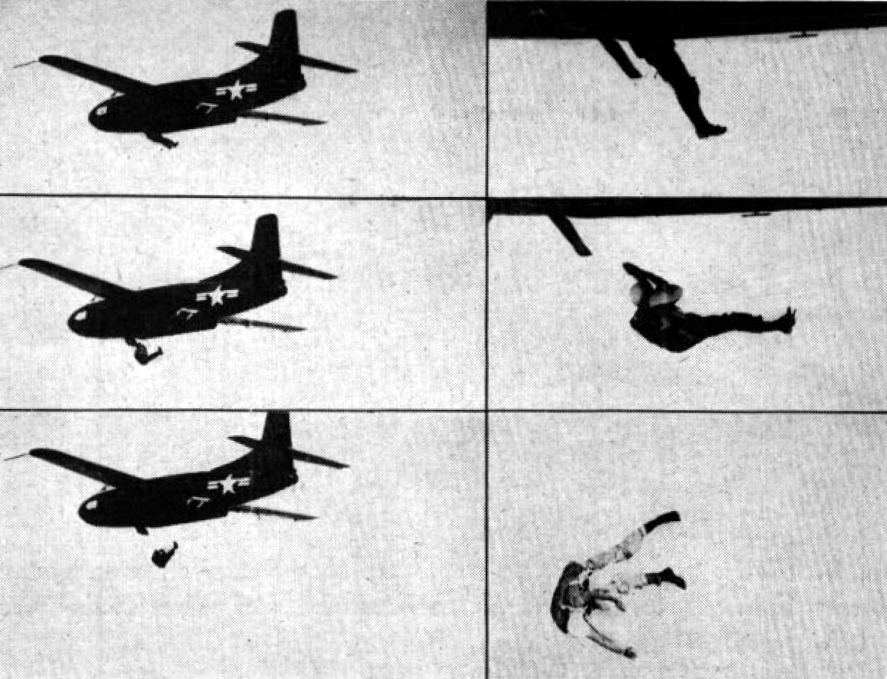
A pilot bails out of an Douglas F3D Skyknight aircraft escape chute

In aircraft, an Escape Chute is an emergency device on an aircraft without ejector seats used for aviators for escaping a damaged aircraft.Aircraft that use such devices are the Douglas F3D Skyknight and A-3 Skywarrior.
