= Escape chute =

Tube used for emergency evacuation

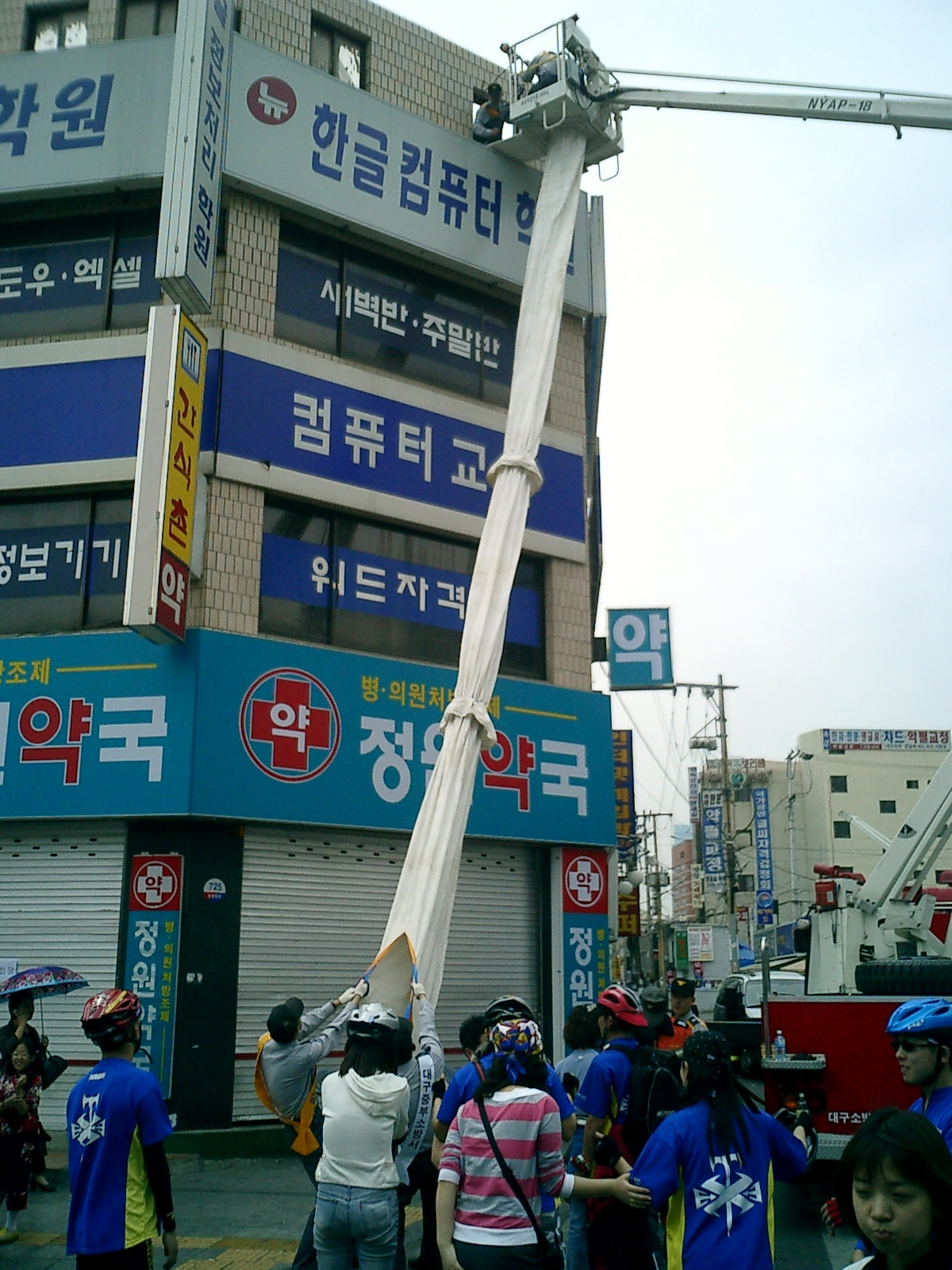
A demonstration of a fire escape chute on the streets of Daegu, South Korea.

An escape chute is a special kind of emergency exit, used where conventional fire escape stairways are impractical. The chute is a fabric (or occasionally metal) tube installed near a special exit on an upper floor or roof of a building, or a tall structure. During use, the chute is deployed, and may be secured at the bottom by a fire fighting crew some distance out from the building. Once the tube is ready, escapees enter the tube and slide down to a lower level or the ground level.

== Description ==
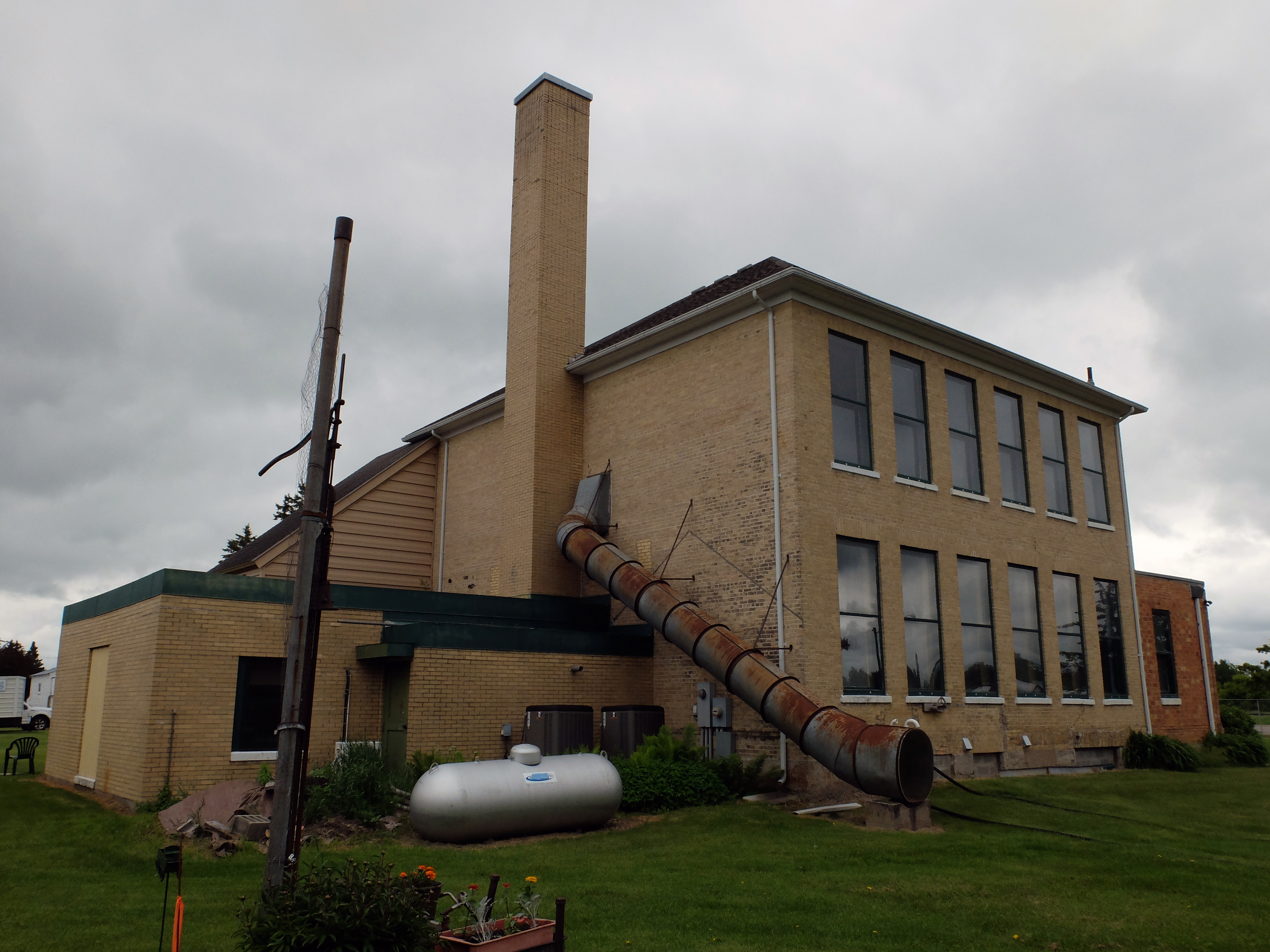
A metal tube fire escape chute on an old school building in Shevlin, Minnesota.

Although some early escape tubes were made entirely of metal, most current designs are made of high-strength fabrics, such as Kevlar. Their flexibility allows for compact storage, rapid deployment, and a gentler braking and controlled descent of users, as compared to traditional metal designs. Fabric tubes may also incorporate inflatable elements to lend some degree of structural rigidity and stability to the escape chute. The fabrics chosen must have flame retardant properties as well.

In addition to fixed escape chutes permanently installed onto buildings, mobile escape systems are produced which can be mounted on the basket of a movable fire truck ladder, or temporarily installed to a building in an emergency.

In response to images of trapped office workers in the September 11 attacks, personal escape devices for emergency use have been proposed, but only rope-based systems appear to be on the market for personal use.

There was also the issue of fire heating the metal tubes, causing the people inside the metal tubes to become severely burned while exiting the building.

Escape chutes are also installed in air traffic control towers where space for redundant stairwells is limited. Escape chutes were tested at the control tower at Kadena Air Base.

== Types ==
There are two main types : internal and external.

=== Internal ===
- Located inside a building, and are commonly positioned away from stairwells.
- Can be used by people inside the building and can be quickly deployed in an emergency.
- Protected against rain, dust, and rodents. They are long-lasting and can be used repeatedly.
- Well designed to safely carry people down to ground level in an emergency.

=== External ===
- Installed outside a building, like near the window, balcony, or terrace
- Can be easily accessed by both inside and outside people of the building in a matter of seconds.
- The chute can bear the heavy load to get everyone evacuated easily and safely in an emergency situation.
- They are made with durable materials that can easily withstand harsh weather and they can be used multiple times.

== History ==
The first rescue hoses were developed in the 1980s. The principle originated in the 19th century, when hoses were originally pulled away from the building so that users could slide down them at an angle, similar to a slide. The principle of inclined hoses is still used in some cases today.

Rescue hoses are widely used as Marine Evacuation Systems (MES) for emergency evacuation on ships.

An escape chute system was installed at the Cape Canaveral launchpads. On the space launch pad SLC-40, an escape chute system was installed in 2024.

== See also ==
- Aircraft escape chutes
- Detrainment device
- Evacuation slide
- Fireman's pole
