= Taxonomy of Lucanidae =

Species of beetle

The Lucanidae are a family of beetles that include the stag beetles. The classification presented here follows Smith (2006), with the exception of the tribal classification within the Lucaninae.

== Subfamily Aesalinae ==
Subfamily Aesalinae

Tribe Aesalini

Genus Aesalus (Fabricius, 1801)

- Aesalus asiaticus Lewis, 1883
- Aesalus himalayicus Kurosawa, 1985
- Aesalus imanishii Inahara & Ratti, 1991
- Aesalus meridionalis Bartolozzi, 1989
- Aesalus neotropicalis Bates, 1886
- Aesalus saburoi
- Aesalus sawaii Fujita & Ichikawa, 1985
- Aesalus scarabaeoides Panzer, 1793
- Aesalus sichuanensis
- Aesalus smithi Bates, 1889
- Aesalus trogoides Albers, 1883
- Aesalus ulanowskii Ganglbauer, 1886

Genus Cretaesalus (fossil)
Genus Echinoaesalus Zelenka, 1993

- Echinoaesalus barriesi (Zelenka, 1993)
- Echinoaesalus hidakai (Araya, 1993)
- Echinoaesalus jaechi (Zelenka,1993)
- Echinoaesalus matsuii (Araya, 1993)
- Echinoaesalus sabahensis (Zelenka, 1994)
- Echinoaesalus schuhi (Zelenka, 1994)
- Echinoaesalus timidus (Krikken, 1975)
- Echinoaesalus yongi (Araya, 1993)

Genus Lucanobium Howden & Lawrence, 1974

- Lucanobium squamosum Howden & Lawrence, 1974

Tribe Ceratognathini

Genus Ceratognathus Westwood, 1838

- Ceratognathus abdominalis Parry, 1870
- Ceratognathus bitumulatus Carter, 1925
- Ceratognathus flabellatus Boileau, 1905
- Ceratognathus frenchi Blackburn, 1897
- Ceratognathus froggatti Blackburn, 1894
- Ceratognathus gilesi Blackburn, 1895
- Ceratognathus macrognathus Boileau, 1905
- Ceratognathus mentiferus Westwood, 1863
- Ceratognathus minutus Lea, 1929
- Ceratognathus niger Westwood, 1838
- Ceratognathus ocularis Carter, 1925
- Ceratognathus rufipennis Westwood, 1872
- Ceratognathus tasmanus Benesh, 1943
- Ceratognathus westwoodi Thomson, 1862

Genus Hilophyllus Paulsen & Mondaca, 2006

- Hilophyllus argentinensis (Martinez, 1981)
- Hilophyllus martinezi Paulsen & Mondaca, 2006
- Hilophyllus penai (Martinez, 1976)

Genus Holloceratognathus Nikolajev, 1998

- Holloceratognathus cylindricus (Broun, 1895)
- Holloceratognathus helotoides (Thomson, 1862)
- Holloceratognathus passaliformis (Holloway, 1962)

Genus Mitophyllus Parry, 1843

- Mitophyllus alboguttatus (Bates, 1867)
- Mitophyllus dispar (Sharp, 1882)
- Mitophyllus foveolatus (Broun, 1880)
- Mitophyllus gibbosus (Broun, 1884)
- Mitophyllus insignis Broun, 1921
- Mitophyllus irroratus Parry, 1842
- Mitophyllus macrocerus (Broun, 1886)
- Mitophyllus parrianus Westwood, 1863
- Mitophyllus reflexus Broun, 1908

Tribe Nicagini

Genus Nicagus LeConte, 1861

- Nicagus obscurus (LeConte, 1848)
- Nicagus occultus Paulsen & Smith, 2005
- Nicagus japonicus Nagel, 1928

== Subfamily Lampriminae ==
Subfamily Lampriminae

Genus Dendroblax White, 1846

- Dendroblax earlianus White, 1846

Genus Homolamprima

- Homolamprima crenulata (MacLeay, 1885)

Genus Lamprima

- Lamprima adolphinae (Gestro, 1875)
- Lamprima aenea Fabricius, 1792
- Lamprima aurata Latreille, 1817
- Lamprima imberbis Barber, 1926
- Lamprima insularis Macleay, 1885

Genus Phalacrognathus

- Phalacrognathus muelleri MacLeay, 1885

Genus Streptocerus Dejean, 1833

- Streptocerus speciosus Fairmaire, 1850

== Subfamily Lucaninae ==
Subfamily Lucaninae Latreille, 1804

Tribe Aegini

Genus Aegus MacLeay, 1819

Tribe Allotopini

Genus Allotopus

- Allotopus moellenkampi (Fruhstorfer, 1894)
- Allotopus rosenbergi (Vollenhoven, 1872)

Genus Mesotopus

Tribe Chiasognathini

Genus Casignetus
Genus Chiasognathus Stephens, 1831

- Chiasognathus beneshi Lacroix, 1978
- Chiasognathus grantii Stephens, 1831
- Chiasognathus jousselini Reiche, 1850
- Chiasognathus latreillei Solier, 1851
- Chiasognathus mniszechii Kiesche 1919

Genus Protognathinus
Genus Sphaenognathus

Tribe Cladognathini

Genus Aphanognathus

- Aphanognathus laterotarsoides (Houlbert, 1915)

Genus Capreolucanus

- Capreolucanus sicardi Didier, 1928

Genus Cladophyllus
Genus Eligmodontus
Genus Gonometopus
Genus Macrodorcas Motschulsky, 1862

- Macrodorcas adachii
- Macrodorcas amamiana
- Macrodorcas barbata
- Macrodorcas bisignata
- Macrodorcas bomansi
- Macrodorcas davidi
- Macrodorcas dierli
- Macrodorcas elsiledis
- Macrodorcas fulvonotata
- Macrodorcas humilis
- Macrodorcas intricata
- Macrodorcas kobayashii
- Macrodorcas koyamai
- Macrodorcas melliana
- Macrodorcas mochizukii
- Macrodorcas moellenkampi
- Macrodorcas montivaga
- Macrodorcas pieli
- Macrodorcas pseudaxis
- Macrodorcas recta Motschulsky, 1858
- Macrodorcas ruficrus
- Macrodorcas songiana
- Macrodorcas striatipennis Motschulsky, 1862
- Macrodorcas ursulae
- Macrodorcas vernicata
- Macrodorcas yaeyamaensis

Genus Palaeognathus
Genus Prismognathus Motschulsky, 1860

- Prismognathus alessandrae
- Prismognathus angularis Waterhouse, 1874
- Prismognathus branczicki
- Prismognathus cheni
- Prismognathus dauricus Motschulsky, 1860
- Prismognathus davidis
- Prismognathus delislei
- Prismognathus formosanus
- Prismognathus klapperichi
- Prismognathus lucidus
- Prismognathus morimotoi
- Prismognathus nigerrimus
- Prismognathus nigricolor
- Prismognathus piluensis
- Prismognathus platycephalus
- Prismognathus ruficephalus
- Prismognathus sinensis
- Prismognathus subnitens
- Prismognathus tokui

Genus Prosopocoilus Westwood, 1845
Genus Pseudorhaetus
Genus Rhaetulus
Genus Rhaetus

- Rhaetus westwoodi (Parry, 1862)

Genus Tetrarthrius
Genus Weinreichius

- Weinreichius perroti Lacroix, 1978

Tribe Colophonini

Genus Colophon

Tribe Cyclommatini

Genus Cyclommatus Parry, 1863

Tribe Dendeziini

Genus Dendezia
Genus Oonotus Parry, 1864
Genus Xiphodontus

Tribe Dorcini

Genus Bartolozziolucanus
Genus Cantharolethrus

- Cantharolethrus luxeri

Genus Cyclommatus

- Cyclommatus scutellaris

Genus Dorcasoides
Genus Dorcus MacLeay, 1819

- Dorcus akahorii
- Dorcus alcides
- Dorcus alexisi
- Dorcus amamianus
- Dorcus antaeus
- Dorcus anteus
- Dorcus arfakianus
- Dorcus binodulosus
- Dorcus brevis
- Dorcus bucephalus
- Dorcus carinulatus
- Dorcus consentaneus
- Dorcus curvidens
- Dorcus cylindricus
- Dorcus davidis
- Dorcus emikoae
- Dorcus eurycephalus
- Dorcus formosanus
- Dorcus gracilicornis
- Dorcus garndis
- Dorcus hopei
- Dorcus hyperion
- Dorcus japonicus
- Dorcus kyanrauensis
- Dorcus metacostatus
- Dorcus miwai
- Dorcus musimon
- Dorcus parallelus
- Dorcus parallelipipedus - lesser stag beetle. Linnaeus, 1758
- Dorcus parryi
- Dorcus parvulus
- Dorcus peyronis
- Dorcus prochazkai
- Dorcus ratiocinativus
- Dorcus rectus
- Dorcus reichei
- Dorcus rudis
- Dorcus sawaii
- Dorcus schenklingi
- Dorcus sewertzowi
- Dorcus suturalis
- Dorcus taiwanicus
- Dorcus tanakai
- Dorcus taurus
- Dorcus tenuecostatus
- Dorcus titanus
- Dorcus tormosanus
- Dorcus ursulus
- Dorcus vavrai
- Dorcus velutinus
- Dorcus vicinus
- Dorcus yamadai

Genus Homoderus
Genus Leptinopterus
Genus Prosopocoilus

- Prosopocoilus astacoides
- Prosopocoilus biplagiatus
- Prosopocoilus bison
- Prosopocoilus giraffa
- Prosopocoilus inclinatus
- Prosopocoilus savagei

Genus Rhaetulus

- Rhaetulus crenatus

Genus Serrognathus
Genus Pycnosiphorus
Genus Sclerostomus

Tribe Figulini

Genus Cardanus
Genus Dinonigidius
Genus Figulus
Genus Ganelius
Genus Nigidionus
Genus Nigidius
Genus Novonigidius
Genus Penichrolucanus

Tribe Lissapterini

Genus Bomansius
Genus Dorculus
Genus Geodorcus
Genus Hoplogonus
Genus Lissapterus
Genus Lissotes
Genus Paralissotes
Genus Pseudodorcus

Tribe Lucanini

Genus Hexarthrius Hope, 1842

- Hexarthrius aduncusJordan & Rothschild, 1894
- Hexarthrius andreasi Schenk, 2003
- Hexarthrius bowringii Parry, 1862
- Hexarthrius buquettii (Hope, 1843)
- Hexarthrius davisoniWaterhouse, 1888
- Hexarthrius forsteri (Hope, 1840)
- Hexarthrius howdeni De Lisle, 1972
- Hexarthrius kirchneri Schenk, 2003
- Hexarthrius mandibularis Deyrolle, 1881
- Hexarthrius melchioritis Séguy, 1954
- Hexarthrius mniszechi(Thomson, 1857)
- Hexarthrius nigritus Lacroix, 1990
- Hexarthrius parryi Hope, 1842
- Hexarthrius rhinoceros(Olivier, 1789)
- Hexarthrius vitalisi Didier, 1925

Genus Lucanus

- Lucanus capreolus
- Lucanus cervus
- Lucanus elaphus
- Lucanus formosanus
- Lucanus maculifemoratus
- Lucanus mazama
- Lucanus placidus
- Lucanus swinhoei
- Lucanus tetraodon

Genus Pseudolucanus

- Pseudolucanus barbarossa (Fabricius, 1801)

Tribe Odontolabini

Genus Calcodes
Genus Neolucanus

- Neolucanus castanopterus

Genus Odontolabis

- Odontolabis castelnaudi
- Odontolabis cuvera
- Odontolabis femoralis
- Odontolabis siva

Tribe Platycerini

Genus Platyceroides Benesh, 1946
Genus Platyceropsis Benesh, 1946

- Platyceropsis keeni (Casey, 1895)

Genus Platycerus Geoffroy, 1762

Tribe Ryssonotini

Genus Cacostomus

- Cacostomus floralis (Lea, 1914)
- Cacostomus squamosus Newman, 1840
- Cacostomus subvittata (Moore, 1994)

Genus Ryssonotus

== Subfamily Syndesinae ==
Subfamily Syndesinae

Tribe Ceruchini

Genus Ceruchus MacLeay, 1819

- Ceruchus piceus (Weber, 1801)
- Ceruchus punctatus LeConte, 1869
- Ceruchus striatus LeConte, 1859
- Ceruchus yangi Huang, Imura & Chen, 2011

Tribe Sinodendronini

Genus Sinodendron Hellwig in Schneider, 1792

- Sinodendron cylindricum (Linnaeus, 1758)
- Sinodendron rugosum Mannerheim, 1843

Tribe Syndesini

Genus Psilodon Perty, 1830

- Psilodon aequinoctiale (Buquet, 1840)
- Psilodon gilberti Boucher, 1993
- Psilodon schuberti Perty, 1830
- Psilodon seguyi (Didier, 1929)
- Psilodon xerophilicum Martinez & Reyes-Castillo, 1985

Genus Syndesus MacLeay, 1819

- †Syndesus ambericus Woodruff, 2009 (Miocene?; Dominican amber)
- Syndesus cancellatus Montrouzier, 1860
- Syndesus cornutus (Fabricius, 1801)
- Syndesus macleayi Boileau, 1905
