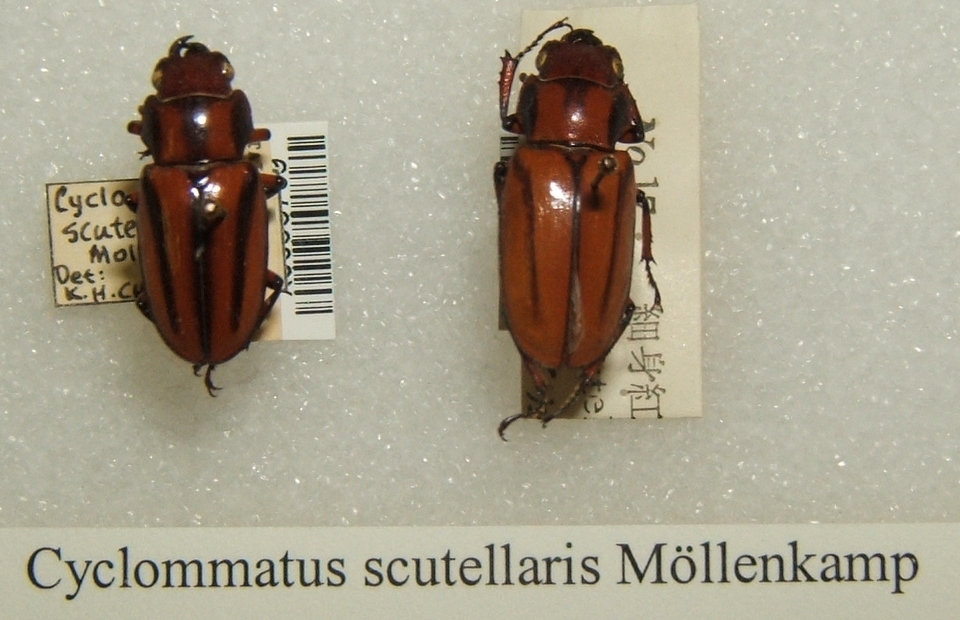
- Cyclommatus scutellaris, adult

Scientific classification
- Kingdom: Animalia
- Phylum: Arthropoda
- Clade: Pancrustacea
- Class: Insecta
- Order: Coleoptera
- Suborder: Polyphaga
- Infraorder: Scarabaeiformia
- Family: Lucanidae
- Genus: Cyclommatus
- Species: C. scutellaris

Binomial name
- Cyclommatus scutellaris Möllenkamp, 1912

= Cyclommatus scutellaris =

Species of beetle

Cyclommatus scutellaris is a beetle of the family Lucanidae.
