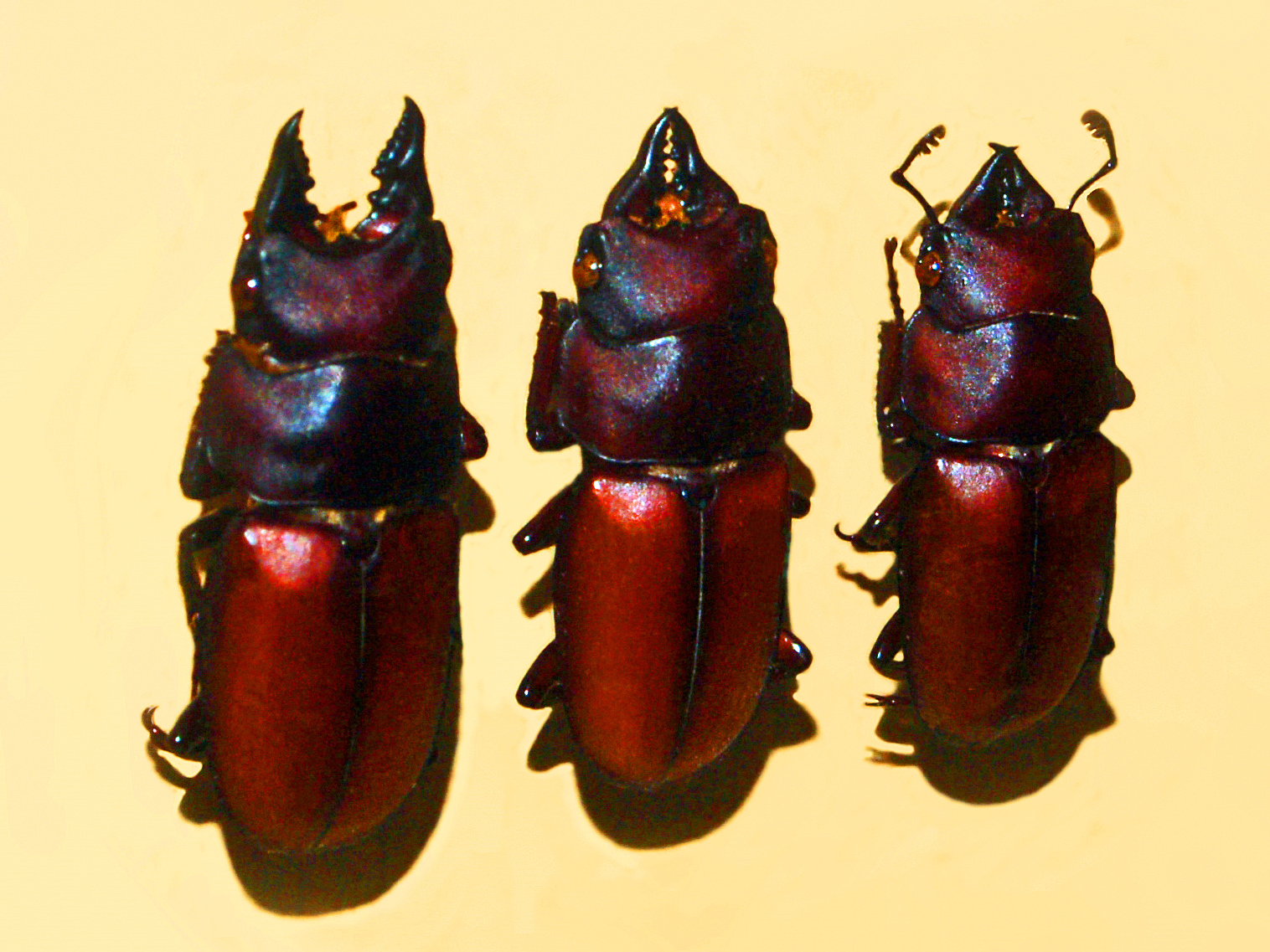
- Prosopocoilus antilope from São Tomé Island. Male and female

Scientific classification
- Kingdom: Animalia
- Phylum: Arthropoda
- Clade: Pancrustacea
- Class: Insecta
- Order: Coleoptera
- Suborder: Polyphaga
- Infraorder: Scarabaeiformia
- Family: Lucanidae
- Genus: Prosopocoilus
- Species: P. antilope

Binomial name
- Prosopocoilus antilope (Swederus, 1787)

Synonyms
- Prosopocoilus antilopus

= Prosopocoilus antilope =

Species of beetle

Prosopocoilus antilopus is a species of beetles of the family Lucanidae.

== Description ==
Prosopocoilus antilopus can reach a length of about 23–47 millimetres (0.91–1.85 in) in males, of about 21–27 millimetres (0.83–1.06 in) in females.

== Distribution ==
This species occurs in Benin, Cameroon, Central African Republic, Democratic Republic of the Congo, Equatorial Guinea, Gabon, Ghana, Guinea, Ivory Coast, Liberia, Republic of the Congo, Rwanda, Senegal, Sierra Leone and Tanzania.
