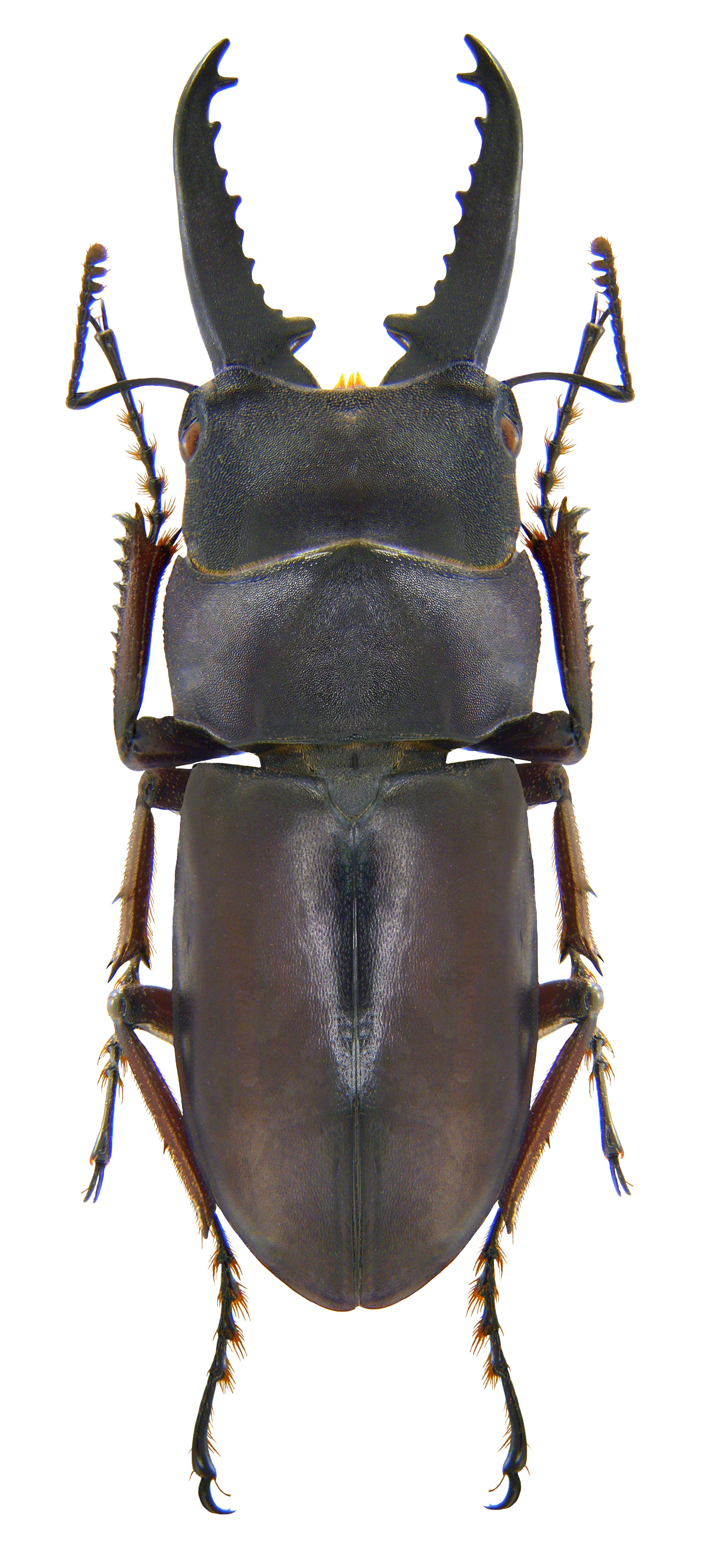
- P. buddha kuijteni male

Scientific classification
- Kingdom: Animalia
- Phylum: Arthropoda
- Clade: Pancrustacea
- Class: Insecta
- Order: Coleoptera
- Suborder: Polyphaga
- Infraorder: Scarabaeiformia
- Family: Lucanidae
- Genus: Prosopocoilus
- Species: P. buddha

Binomial name
- Prosopocoilus buddha (Hope, 1842)

= Prosopocoilus buddha =

Species of beetle

Prosopocoilus buddha is a species of stag beetle (Coleoptera: Scarabaeoidea) in the tribe Cladognathini. This Asian species is variable, with several known subspecies and widely distributed from India to Sulawesi.

== Description and development ==
This is a medium-sized (males 26-63 mm) species for the genus Prosopocoilus, with a wide, glossy reddish-brown to black appearance. The species is very variable: large males may have jaws that are long, rather thin and slightly curved, with a tooth at the root, a slightly larger tooth just outside the middle and a number of smaller teeth. Small males tend to have short, knife-shaped and jagged jaws. The head is large, wide, and not sculptured, with antennae having a three-wire fan. The pronotum is considerably wider than long, not narrowed at the base. The underside is the same colour as the top and the legs are dark brown to black. The female is smaller, wider and shinier, with no enlarged jaws.

The larvae develop in rotten tree trunks, probably taking a year to develop. The adult beetles may drink sap from trees.

== Subspecies ==
BioLib lists the following subspecies:

- P. buddha approximatus (Parry, 1864) - Tibet, Indo-China
- P. buddha annae Bomans, 1992 - Borneo
- P. buddha babuyanensis Mizunuma, 1994 - Philippines: Babuyan
- P. buddha buddha (Hope, 1842) - India, Bangladesh, Thailand
- P. buddha cavifrons (Hope & Westwood, 1845) - Philippines: Luzon, Mindoro, Panay, Negros
- P. buddha ebeninus (Albers, 1891) - Philippines: Mindanao
- P. buddha erberi (Lacroix, 1988) - Sumatra
- P. buddha javanensis (Neervoort van de Poll, 1895) - Java
- P. buddha kuijteni Bomans, 1978 - Thailand, West Malaysia
- P. buddha palawanicus (Felsche, 1912) - Palawan
- P. buddha patricius (Schaufuss, 1887) - Sulawesi
