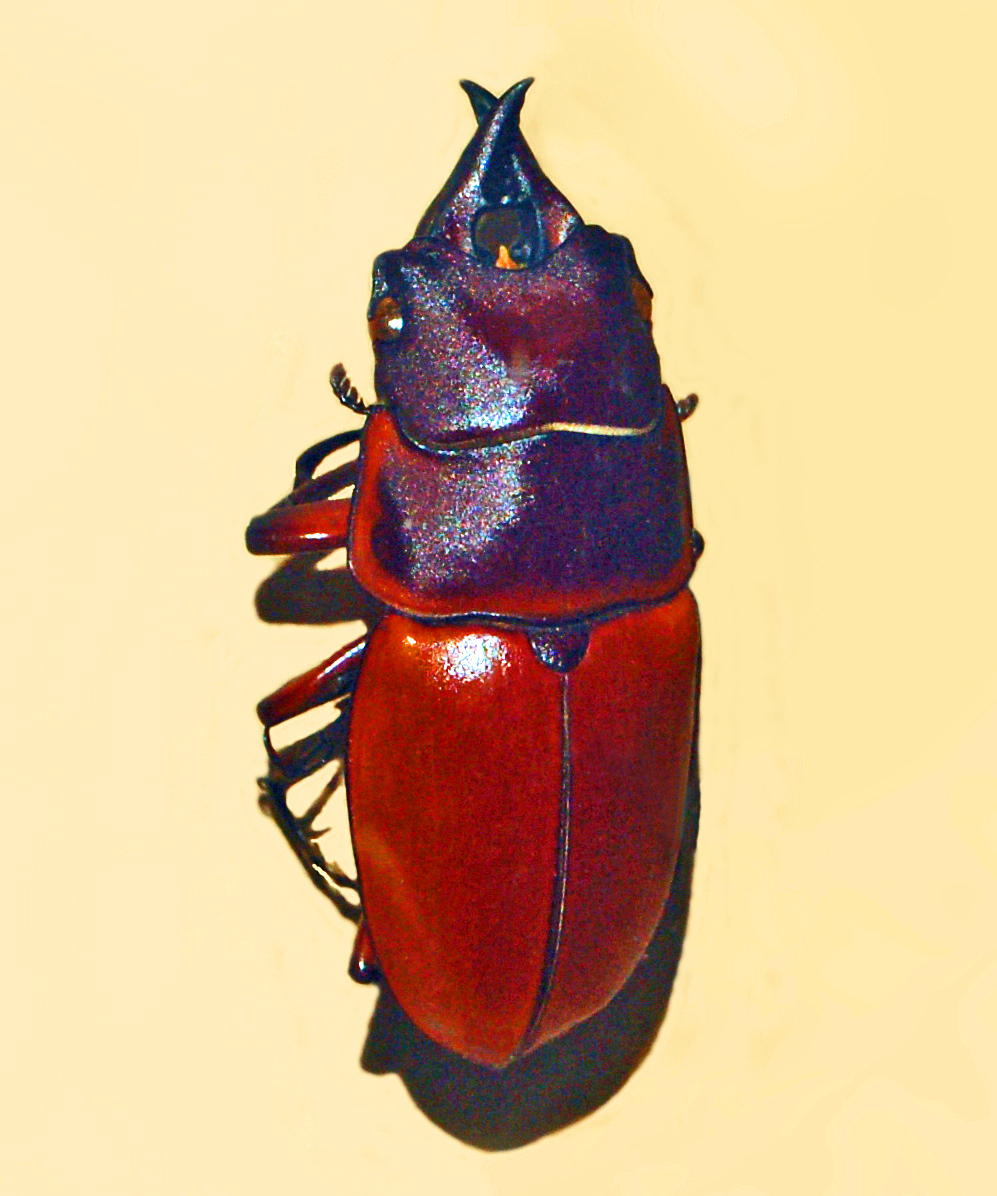
- Prosopocoilus tragulus from Indonesia

Scientific classification
- Kingdom: Animalia
- Phylum: Arthropoda
- Clade: Pancrustacea
- Class: Insecta
- Order: Coleoptera
- Suborder: Polyphaga
- Infraorder: Scarabaeiformia
- Family: Lucanidae
- Genus: Prosopocoilus
- Species: P. tragulus

Binomial name
- Prosopocoilus tragulus (Vollenhoven, 1860/61)

= Prosopocoilus tragulus =

Species of beetle

Prosopocoilus tragulus is a species of beetle in the family Lucanidae.

== Description ==
Prosopocoilus tragulus can reach a length of about 23–59 millimetres (0.91–2.32 in) in males and about 25–32 millimetres (0.98–1.26 in) in females.

== Distribution ==
This species occurs in Indonesia and New Guinea.
