= Meulenkamp =

Meulenkamp is a surname of Dutch origin.

== List of people with the surname ==
- Delia Meulenkamp (1933–2013), Dutch-American swimmer
- Ron Meulenkamp (born 1988), Dutch darts player
- Wim Meulenkamp (born 1973), Dutch politician

== See also ==
- Mollenkamp
- Melenka, Russia
