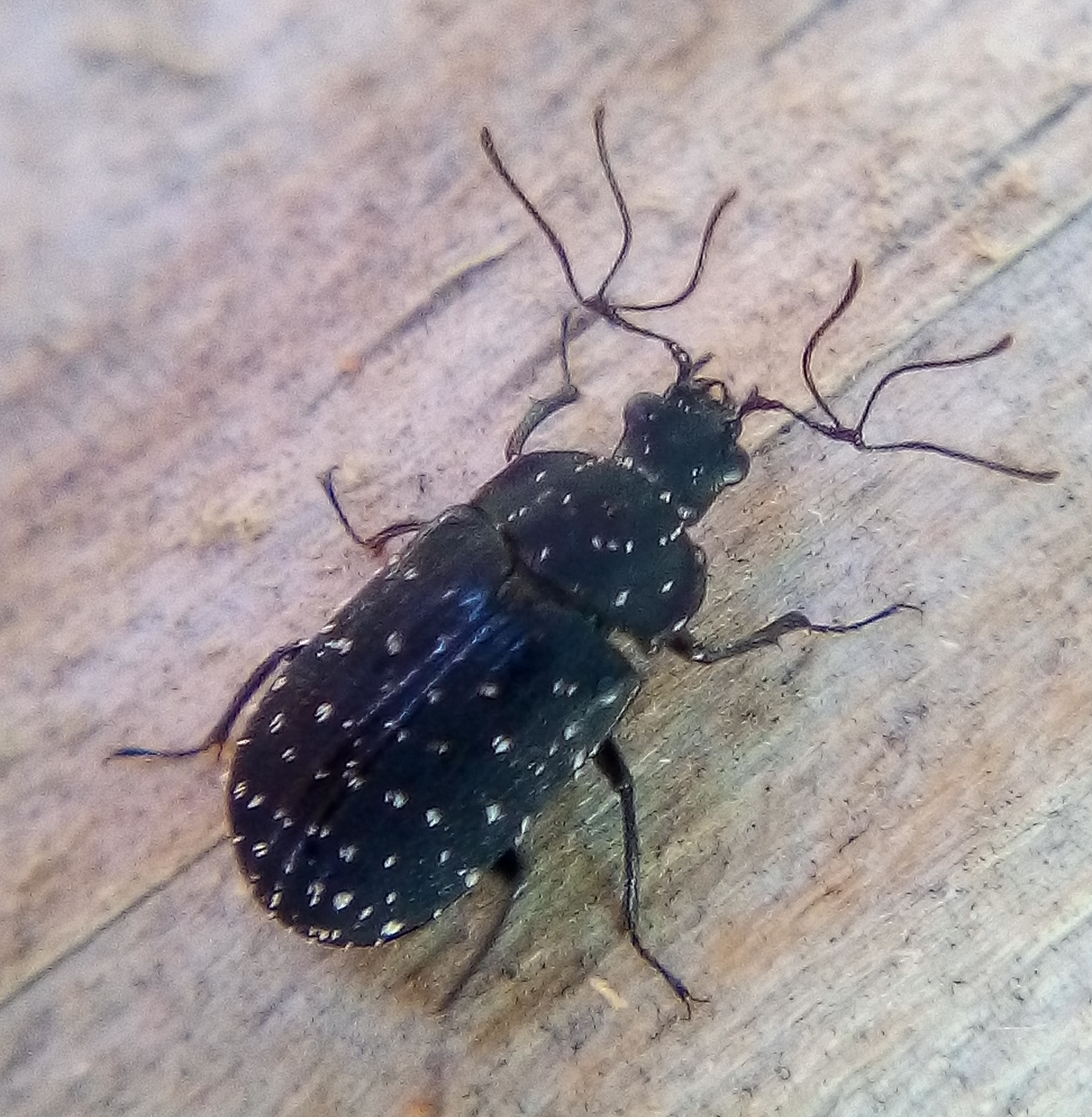
- Mitophyllus macrocerus

Scientific classification
- Kingdom: Animalia
- Phylum: Arthropoda
- Class: Insecta
- Order: Coleoptera
- Suborder: Polyphaga
- Infraorder: Scarabaeiformia
- Family: Lucanidae
- Subfamily: Aesalinae
- Tribe: Ceratognathini
- Genus: Mitophyllus; Parry, 1843

= Mitophyllus =

Genus of beetles

Mitophyllus is a genus of large stag beetles endemic to New Zealand.

== Species ==
These 14 species belong to the genus Mitophyllus:

- Mitophyllus alboguttatus (Bates, 1867)
- Mitophyllus angusticeps Broun, 1895
- Mitophyllus arcuatus Holloway, 2007
- Mitophyllus dispar (Sharp, 1882)
- Mitophyllus falcatus Holloway, 2007
- Mitophyllus foveolatus (Broun, 1880)
- Mitophyllus fusculus (Broun, 1886)
- Mitophyllus gibbosus (Broun, 1885)
- Mitophyllus insignis Broun, 1923
- Mitophyllus irroratus Parry, 1843
- Mitophyllus macrocerus (Broun, 1886)
- Mitophyllus parrianus Westwood, 1863 (Parry's stag beetle)
- Mitophyllus reflexus Broun, 1909
- Mitophyllus solox Holloway, 2007

== See also ==
- Taxonomy of Lucanidae
