= Mollenkamp =

Mollenkamp is a surname. Notable people with the surname include:

- Fred Mollenkamp (1890–1948), American baseball player
- Thomas Möllenkamp (born 1961), German rower
- Wilhelm Möllenkamp (1858–1917), German entomologist

== See also ==
- Meulenkamp
