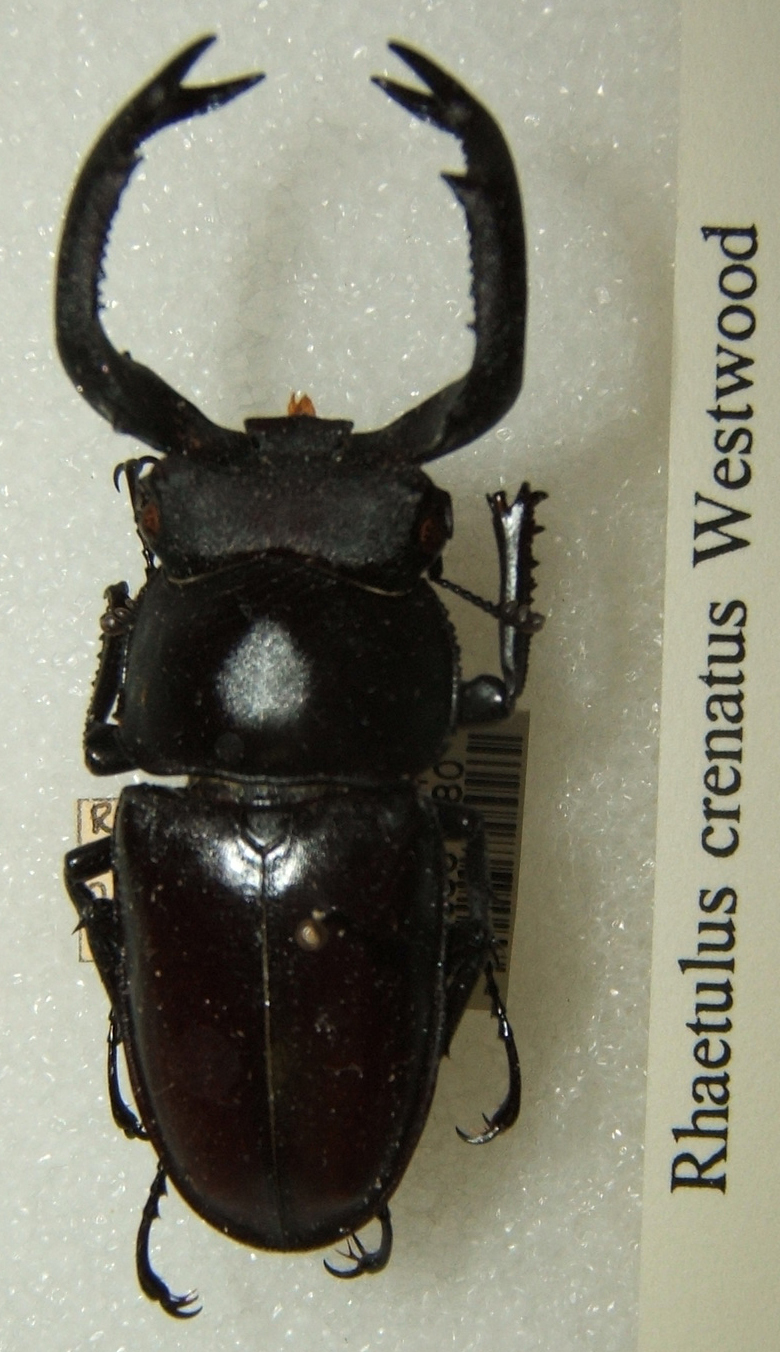
- Rhaetulus crenatus, adult

Scientific classification
- Kingdom: Animalia
- Phylum: Arthropoda
- Class: Insecta
- Order: Coleoptera
- Suborder: Polyphaga
- Infraorder: Scarabaeiformia
- Family: Lucanidae
- Genus: Rhaetulus
- Species: R. crenatus

Binomial name
- Rhaetulus crenatus Westwood, 1871

= Rhaetulus crenatus =

Species of beetle

Rhaetulus crenatus is a beetle of the Family Lucanidae.
