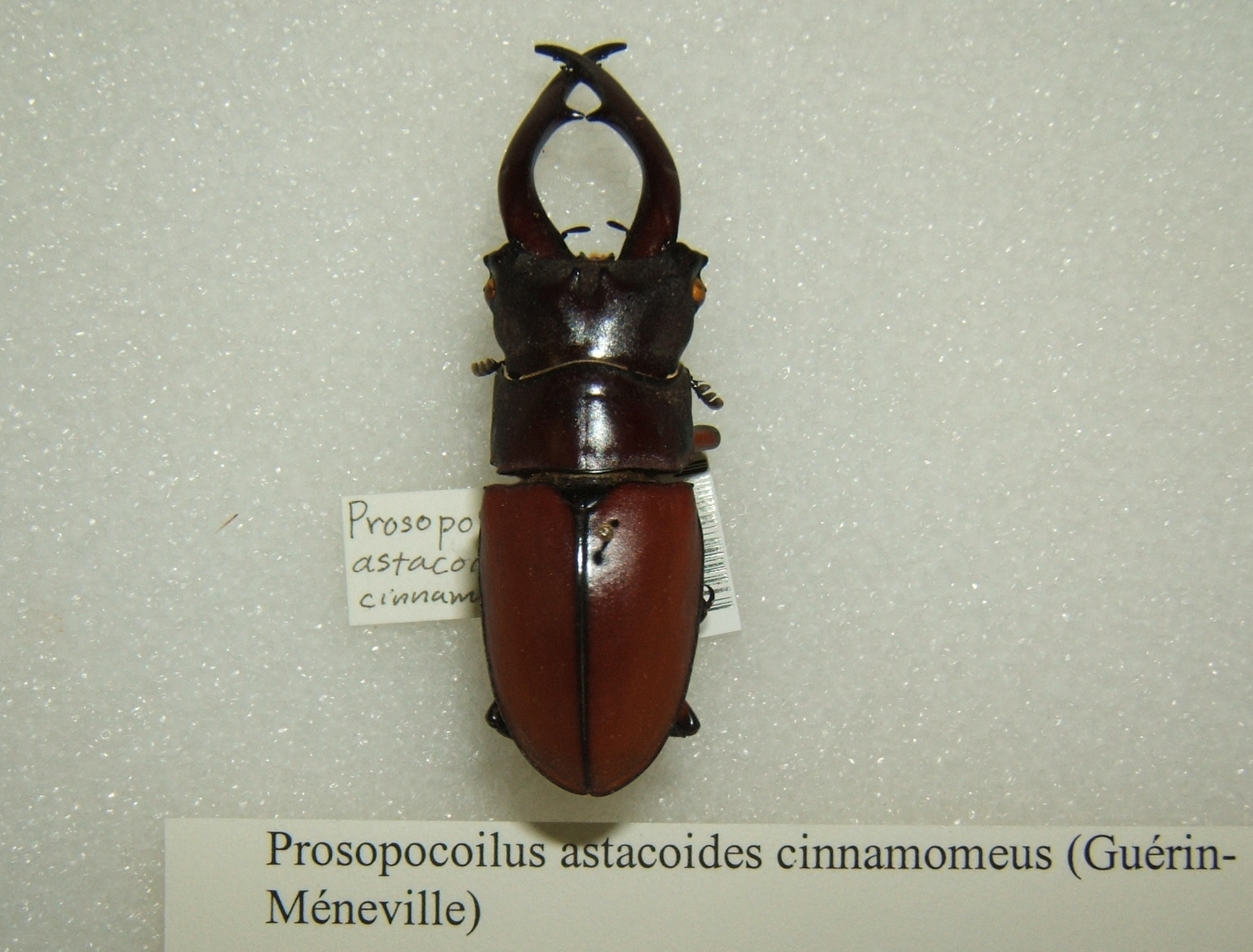
- Prosopocoilus astacoides cinnamomeus, adult

Scientific classification
- Kingdom: Animalia
- Phylum: Arthropoda
- Clade: Pancrustacea
- Class: Insecta
- Order: Coleoptera
- Suborder: Polyphaga
- Infraorder: Scarabaeiformia
- Family: Lucanidae
- Genus: Prosopocoilus
- Species: P. astacoides

Binomial name
- Prosopocoilus astacoides (Hope, 1840)

= Prosopocoilus astacoides =

Species of beetle

Prosopocoilus astacoides is a beetle of the family Lucanidae. It lives 8–10 months and is around 50–70 mm. Like all beetles in the Prosopocoilus genus they have sharp mandibles used for fighting. They will shake their antenna when angry.

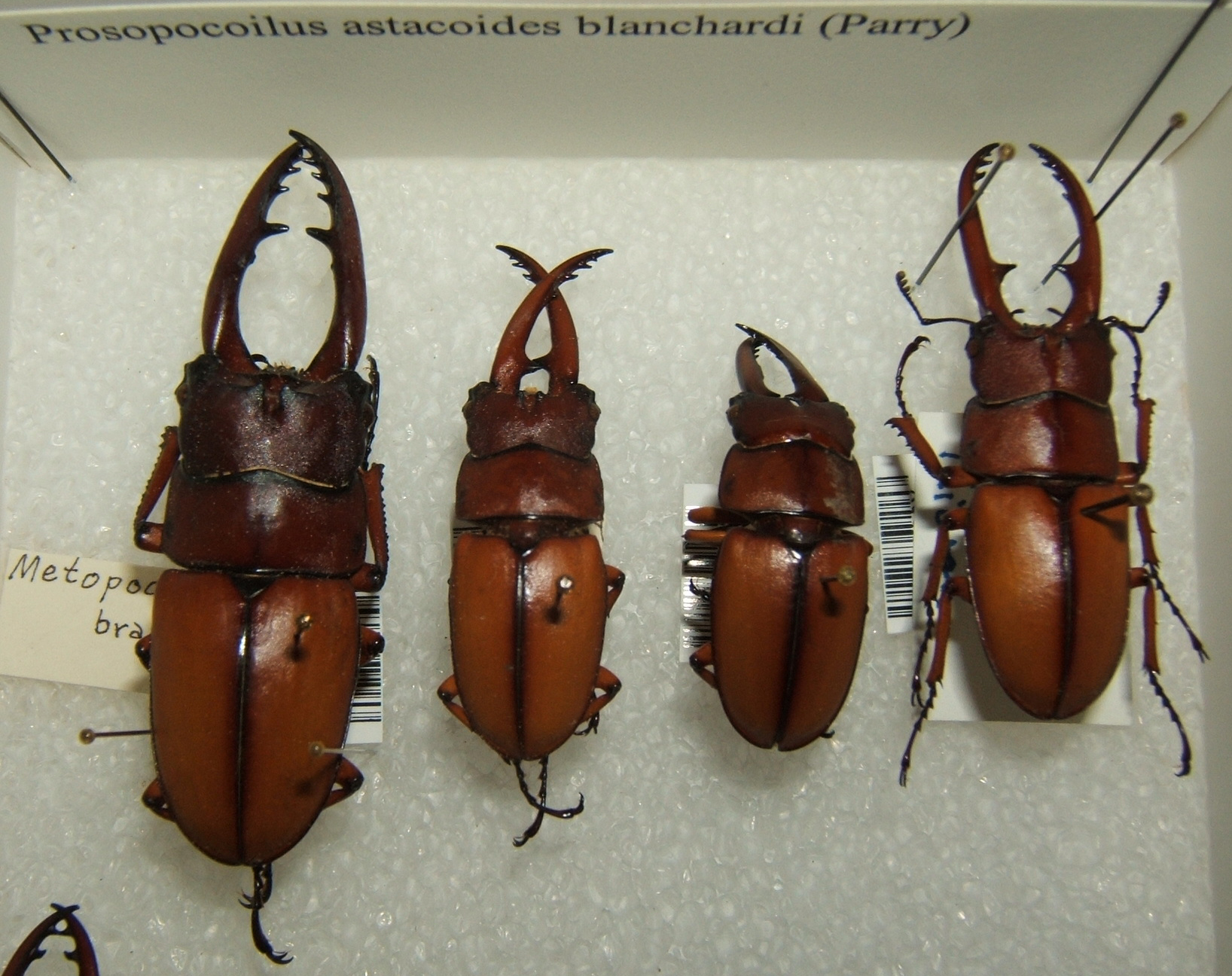
Prosopocoilus astacoides blanchardi

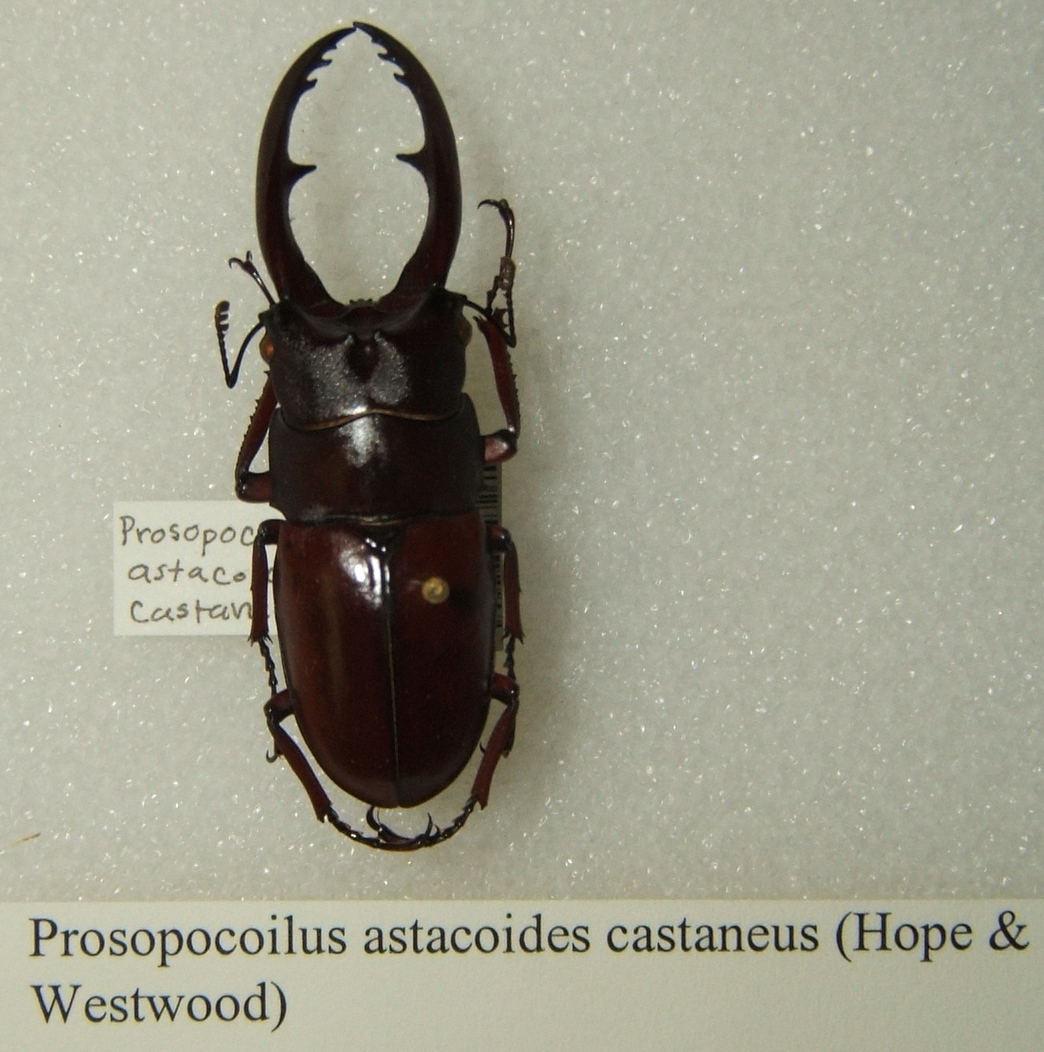
Prosopocoilus astacoides castaneus

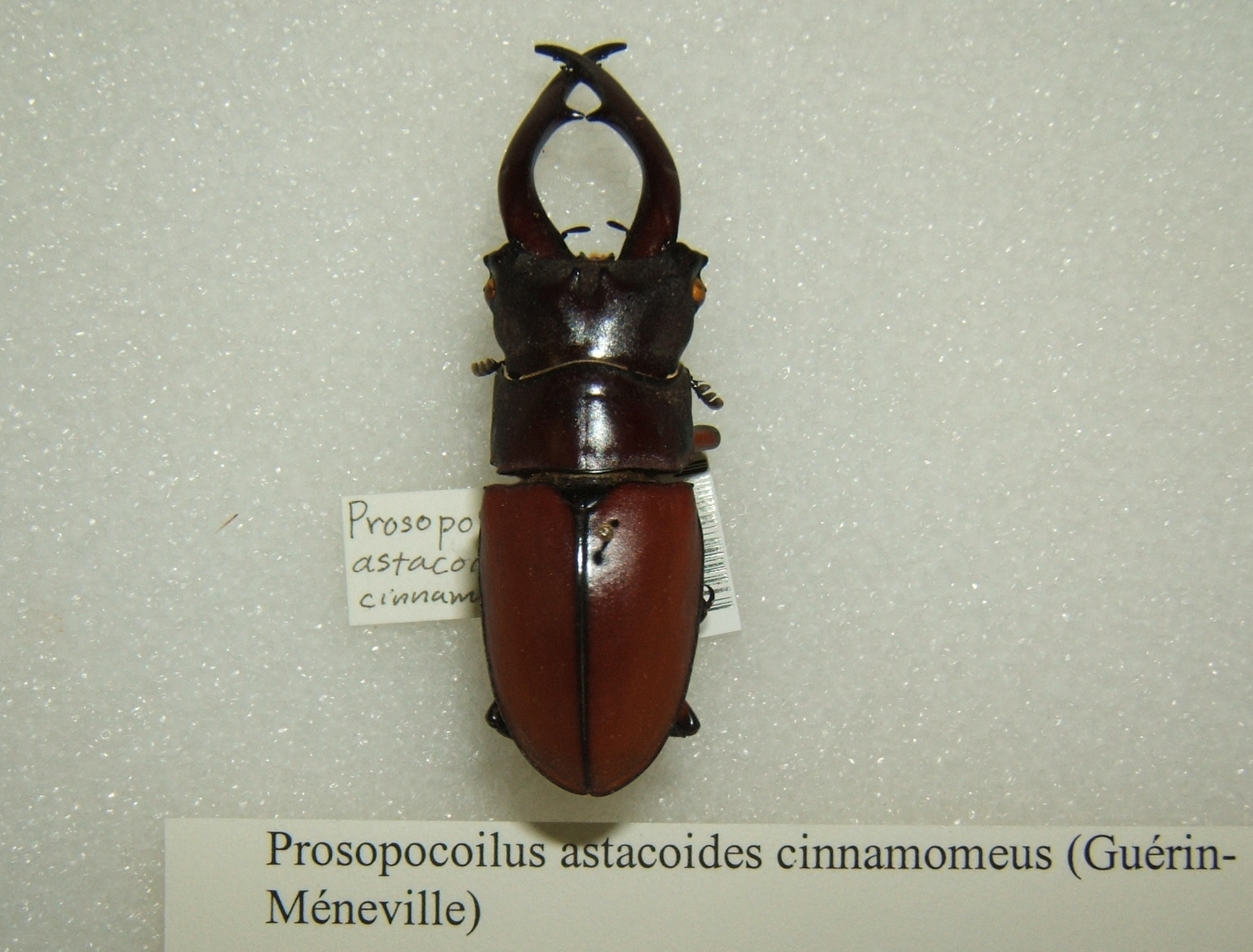
Prosopocoilus astacoides cinnamomeus
