= Nicagus occultus =

Scientific classification
- Domain: Eukaryota
- Kingdom: Animalia
- Phylum: Arthropoda
- Class: Insecta
- Order: Coleoptera
- Suborder: Polyphaga
- Infraorder: Scarabaeiformia
- Family: Lucanidae
- Genus: Nicagus
- Species: N. occultus

Binomial name
- Nicagus occultus Paulsen & Smith, 2005

Species of beetle

Nicagus occultus is a species of stag beetle in the family Lucanidae. It is found in North America.
