= Nicagus =

Scientific classification
- Kingdom: Animalia
- Phylum: Arthropoda
- Clade: Pancrustacea
- Class: Insecta
- Order: Coleoptera
- Suborder: Polyphaga
- Infraorder: Scarabaeiformia
- Family: Lucanidae
- Subfamily: Aesalinae
- Genus: Nicagus; LeConte, 1861

Genus of beetles

Nicagus is a genus of stag beetles in the family Lucanidae: representing the monogeneric tribe Nicagini in the subfamily Aesalinae. There are at least three described species in Nicagus, recorded from Japan and North America.

== Species ==
These three species belong to the genus Nicagus:

- Nicagus japonicus Nagel, 1928 - Japan
- Nicagus obscurus (LeConte, 1847) - United States (from New Hampshire to Iowa and Alabama)
- Nicagus occultus Paulsen & Smith, 2005 - United States (Texas, New Mexico)
