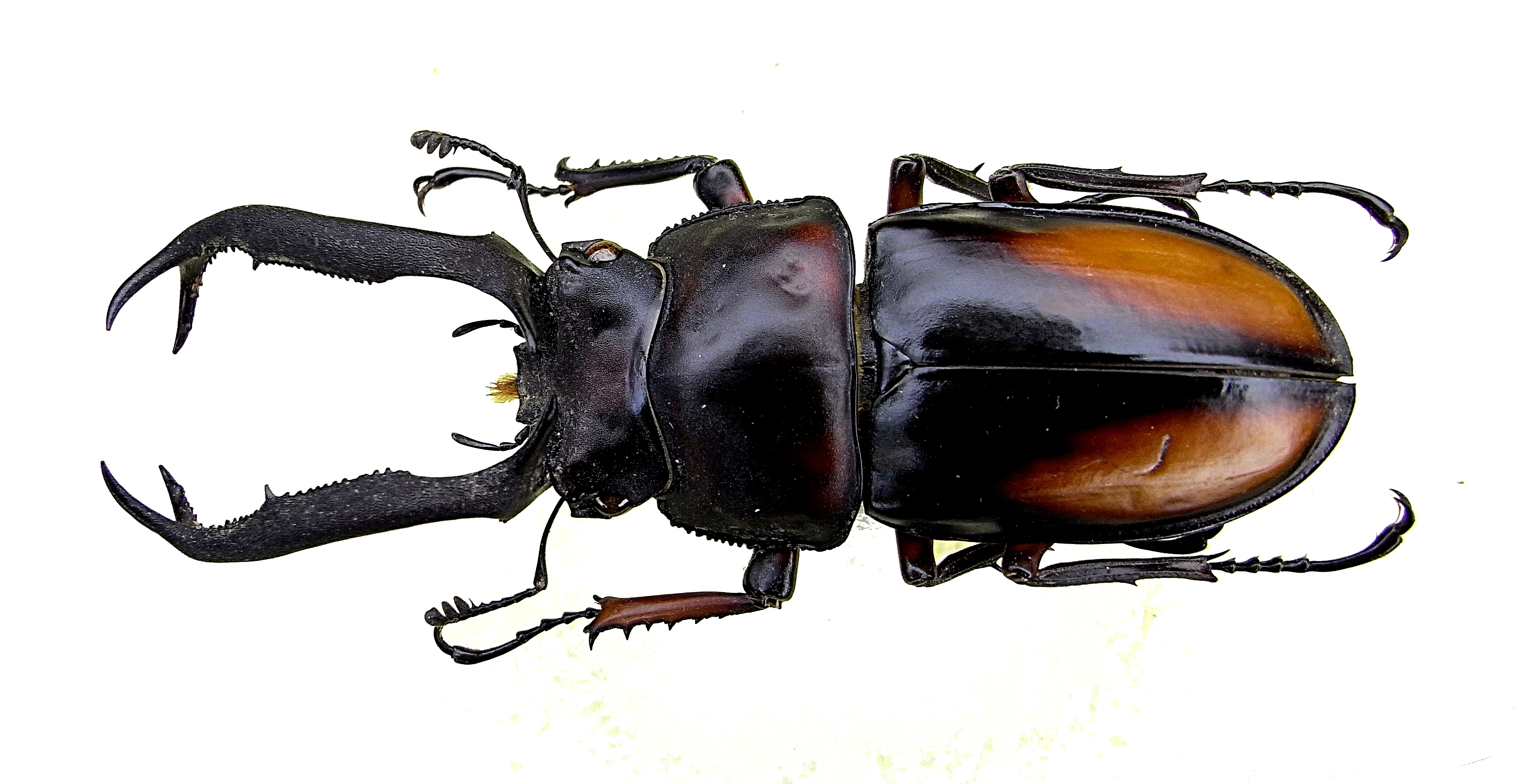
- Rhaetulus didieri

Scientific classification
- Kingdom: Animalia
- Phylum: Arthropoda
- Class: Insecta
- Order: Coleoptera
- Suborder: Polyphaga
- Infraorder: Scarabaeiformia
- Superfamily: Scarabaeoidea
- Family: Lucanidae
- Subfamily: Lucaninae
- Genus: Rhaetulus; Westwood, 1871

= Rhaetulus =

Genus of beetles

Rhaetulus is a genus of Asian stag beetles in the subfamily Lucaninae and now placed in the monogeneric tribe Rhaethulini Miwa, 1931; it was originally erected by John Westwood in 1871. Species have been recorded from China, Indochina, Taiwan and certain other Pacific islands.

== Species ==
The Global Biodiversity Information Facility lists:

1. Rhaetulus crenatus Westwood, 1871
2. Rhaetulus didieri de Lisle, 1970
3. Rhaetulus maii Maeda, 2009
4. Rhaetulus speciosus Boileau, 1911
5. Rhaetulus recticornis Kurosawa, 1964
