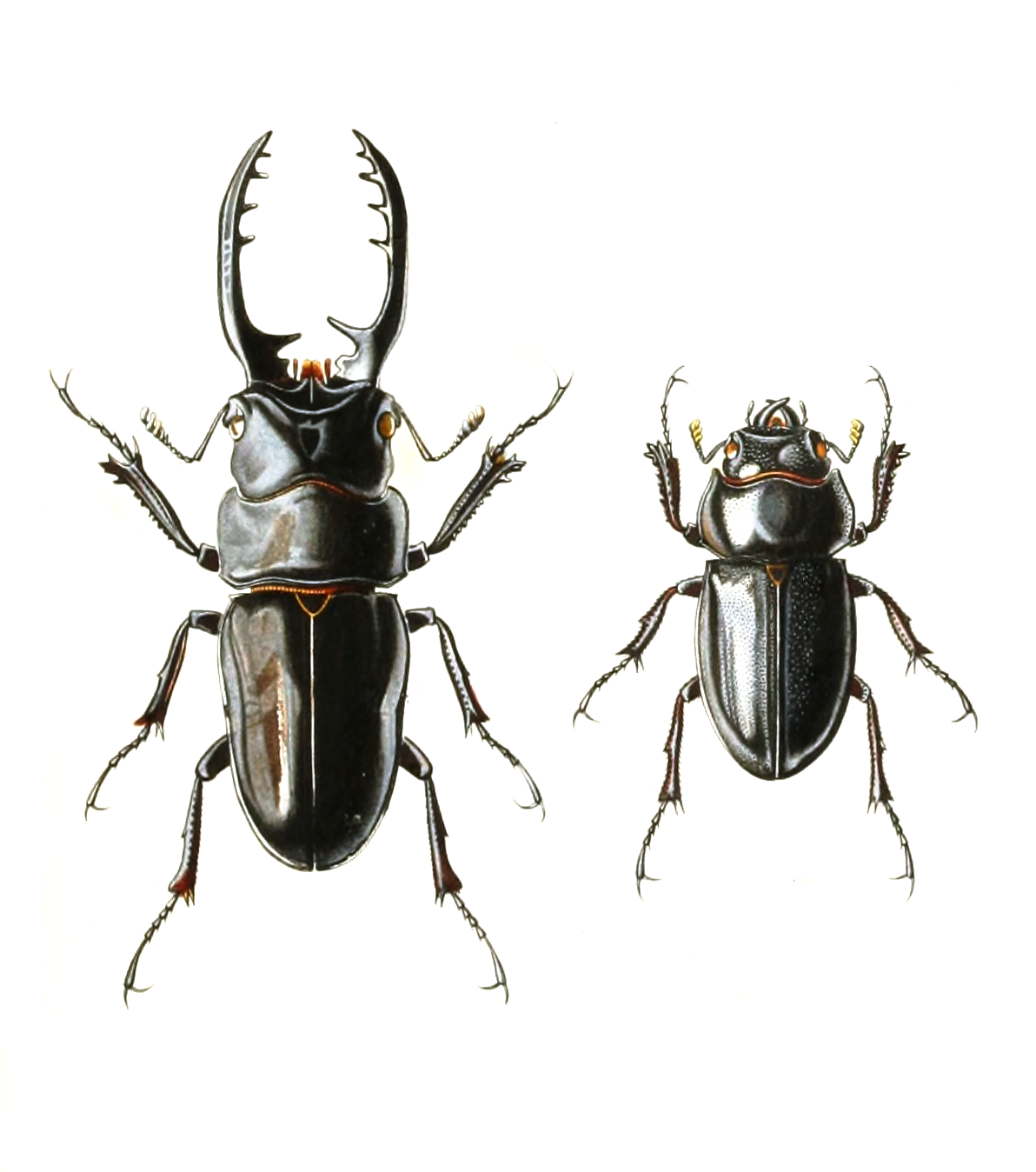
- Prosopocoilus forficula male and female

Scientific classification
- Kingdom: Animalia
- Phylum: Arthropoda
- Clade: Pancrustacea
- Class: Insecta
- Order: Coleoptera
- Suborder: Polyphaga
- Infraorder: Scarabaeiformia
- Family: Lucanidae
- Tribe: Cladognathini
- Genus: Prosopocoilus; Westwood, 1845

Species
- See below

= Prosopocoilus =

Genus of stag beetles

Prosopocoilus is a genus of beetles that belongs to the family Lucanidae (stag beetles).

== Taxonomy ==
The genus was described by John Obadiah Westwood, an English entomologist and archaeologist, in 1845.

=== Species ===
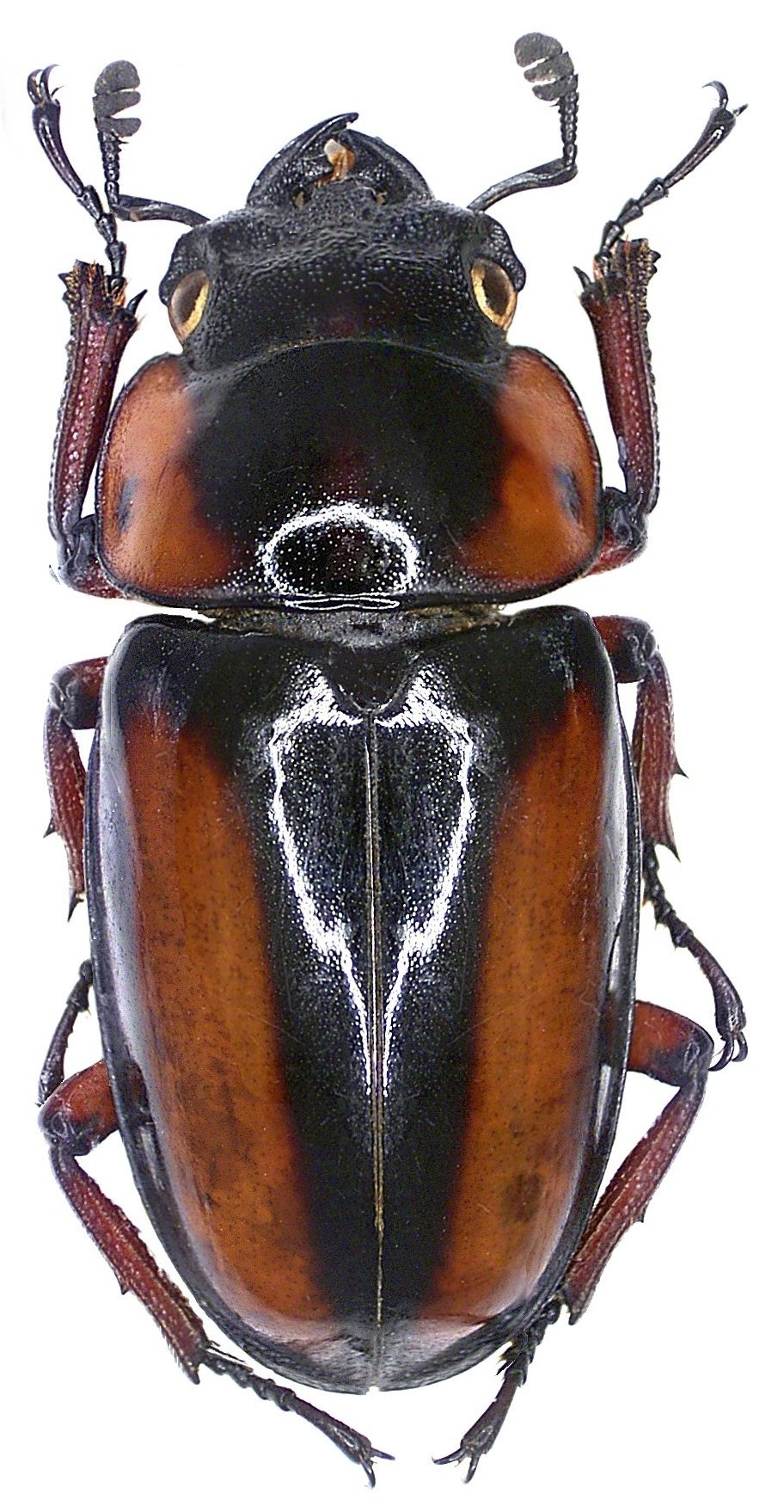
Female Prosopocoilus savagei

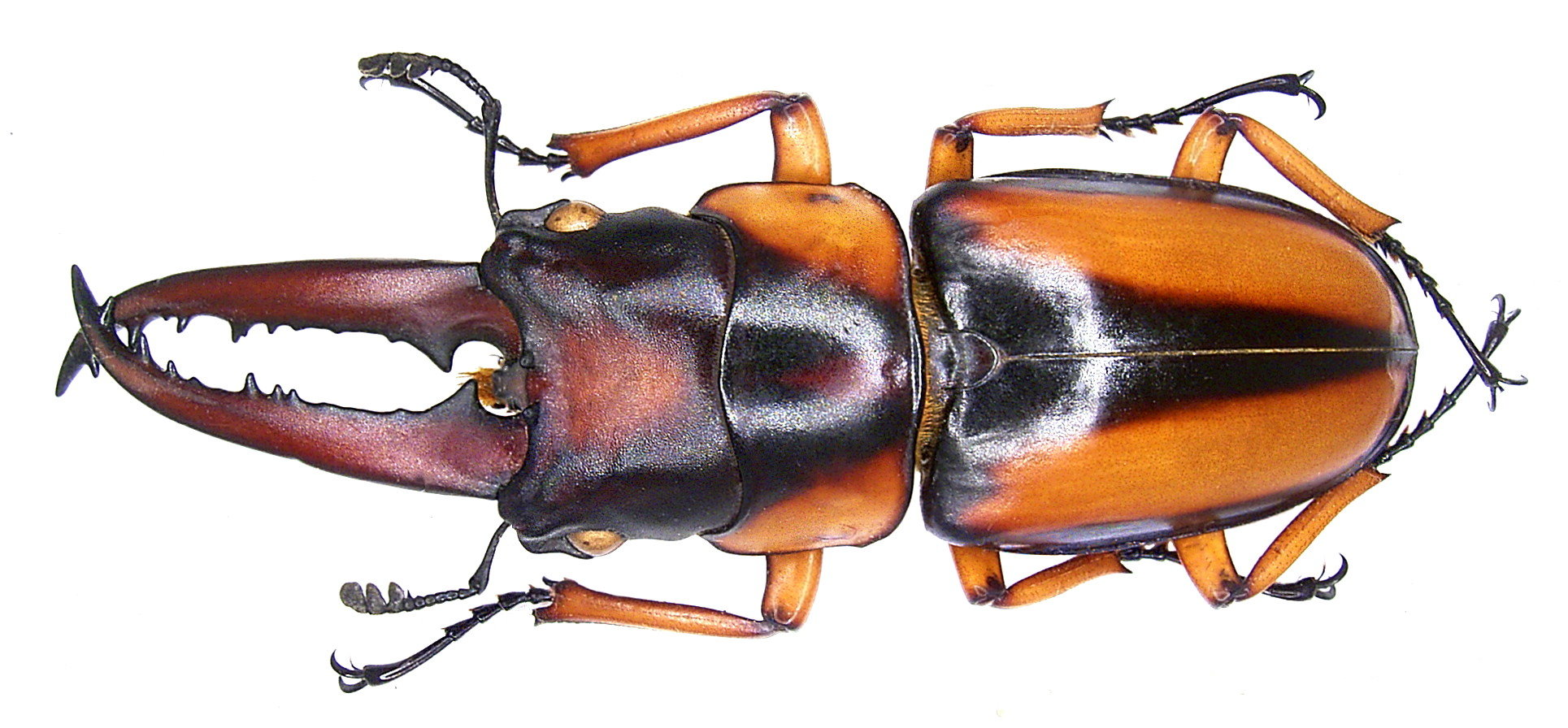
Male Prosopocoilus savagei

- Prosopocoilus antilope (Swederus, 1787)
- Prosopocoilus assimilis (Parry, 1864)
- Prosopocoilus astacoides (Hope, 1840)
- Prosopocoilus aterrimus Nagel, 1938
- Prosopocoilus attenuatus (Parry, 1864)
- Prosopocoilus aulicus Möllenkamp, 1905
- Prosopocoilus bidentatus Bomans, 1978
- Prosopocoilus biplagiatus (Westwood, 1855)
- Prosopocoilus bison (Olivier, 1789)
- Prosopocoilus blanchardi (Parry, 1873)
- Prosopocoilus boreli Boileau, 1904
- Prosopocoilus bruijni Oberthür, 1879
- Prosopocoilus buddha (Hope, 1842)
- Prosopocoilus caprecornus Didier, 1931
- Prosopocoilus cardoni Didier, 1927
- Prosopocoilus chalcoides Lacroix & Ratti, 1983
- Prosopocoilus christophei Bomans, 1978
- Prosopocoilus chujoi DeLisle, 1964
- Prosopocoilus cilipes (Thomson, 1862)
- Prosopocoilus confucius (Hope, 1842)
- Prosopocoilus congoanus Duvivier, 1891
- Prosopocoilus cornuatus Didier, 1927
- Prosopocoilus corporaali Nagel, 1933
- Prosopocoilus crenulidens (Fairmaire, 1895)
- Prosopocoilus curvipes (Hope & Westwood, 1845)
- Prosopocoilus cyclommatoides Lacroix, 1978
- Prosopocoilus debatissei Bomans, 1992
- Prosopocoilus decellei Endrödi, 1968
- Prosopocoilus decipiens (Parry, 1864)
- Prosopocoilus denticulatus Boileau, 1901
- Prosopocoilus dentifer Deyrolle, 1865
- Prosopocoilus dissimilis (Boileau, 1898)
- Prosopocoilus doesburgi Bomans, 1978
- Prosopocoilus doris Kriesche, 1920
- Prosopocoilus dorsalis (Erichson, 1834)
- Prosopocoilus downesi (Hope, 1835)
- Prosopocoilus dubius DeLisle, 1968
- Prosopocoilus duplodentatus Benesh, 1943
- Prosopocoilus erici Bomans, 1992
- Prosopocoilus faber Thomson, 1862
- Prosopocoilus fabricei Lacroix, 1988
- Prosopocoilus feai Boileau, 1902
- Prosopocoilus felschei (Möllenkamp, 1904)
- Prosopocoilus flavidus (Parry, 1862)
- Prosopocoilus flavocinctus Weinreich, 1971
- Prosopocoilus forceps (Vollenhoven, 1861)
- Prosopocoilus forficula (Thomson, 1856)
- Prosopocoilus formosanus (Miwa, 1929)
- Prosopocoilus francisi Arnaud, 1986
- Prosopocoilus fruhstorferi Kolbe, 1897
- Prosopocoilus fuscescens Didier, 1927
- Prosopocoilus fuscocinctus DeLisle, 1973
- Prosopocoilus fuscus Bomans, 1977
- Prosopocoilus gertrudae Arnaud & Lacroix, 1991
- Prosopocoilus giraffa (Olivier, 1842)
- Prosopocoilus gracilis (Saunders, 1854)
- Prosopocoilus granosus Didier, 1929
- Prosopocoilus guerlachi Didier & Séguy, 1952
- Prosopocoilus hachijoensis Nomura, 1960
- Prosopocoilus hasterti Boileau, 1912
- Prosopocoilus henryi (Arrow, 1935)
- Prosopocoilus hiekei (DeLisle, 1970)
- Prosopocoilus histrio (Arrow, 1935)
- Prosopocoilus inclinatus (Motschulsky, 1857)
- Prosopocoilus inermis Séguy, 1955
- Prosopocoilus inouei DeLisle, 1964
- Prosopocoilus ipseni Lacroix, 1987
- Prosopocoilus ismaeli Lacroix, 1984
- Prosopocoilus julietae Nagai & Tsukamoto, 2003
- Prosopocoilus kamanita Kriesche, 1922
- Prosopocoilus kannegieteri (Van de Poll, 1895)
- Prosopocoilus kasaiensis Maes, 1990
- Prosopocoilus katanganus Bomans, 1967
- Prosopocoilus kirchneri Ipsen, 1999
- Prosopocoilus kunikoae Mizunuma, 1994
- Prosopocoilus lacroixi (Bomans, 1970)
- Prosopocoilus lafertei (Reiche, 1852)
- Prosopocoilus laminifer Boileau, 1905
- Prosopocoilus laoticus Kriesche, 1922
- Prosopocoilus lateralis (Hope & Westwood, 1845)
- Prosopocoilus laterinus (Didier, 1928)
- Prosopocoilus laterotarsus Houlbert, 1915
- Prosopocoilus lesnei Didier, 1927
- Prosopocoilus lumawigi DeLisle, 1977
- Prosopocoilus maclellandi (Hope, 1842)
- Prosopocoilus maculatus Bomans, 1967
- Prosopocoilus marginatus Lacroix & Ratti, 1973
- Prosopocoilus micans DeLisle, 1977
- Prosopocoilus mirabilis Boileau, 1904
- Prosopocoilus modestus Parry, 1864
- Prosopocoilus mohnikei Parry, 1873
- Prosopocoilus motschulskii (Waterhouse, 1869)
- Prosopocoilus myrmecoleon (Schaufuss, 1887)
- Prosopocoilus mysticus Parry, 1870
- Prosopocoilus natalensis (Parry, 1864)
- Prosopocoilus neopomeraniensis DeLisle, 1967
- Prosopocoilus nicollei Laxroix, 1978
- Prosopocoilus occipitalis Hope & Westwood, 1845
- Prosopocoilus oweni (Hope & Westwood, 1845)
- Prosopocoilus parryi Boileau, 1913
- Prosopocoilus passaaloides (Hope & Westwood, 1845)
- Prosopocoilus pasteuri Ritsema, 1892
- Prosopocoilus perberi Desfontaine & Moretto, 2003
- Prosopocoilus perplexus (Parry, 1862)
- Prosopocoilus planeti (Boileau, 1897)
- Prosopocoilus politus (Parry, 1862)
- Prosopocoilus porrectus Bomans, 1978
- Prosopocoilus pouillaudei Houbert, 1915
- Prosopocoilus poultoni (Boileau, 1911)
- Prosopocoilus prosopocoeloides Houlbert, 1915
- Prosopocoilus pseudocongoanus Bomans, 1967
- Prosopocoilus pseudodissimilis Y. Kurosawa, 1976
- Prosopocoilus punctatissimus (Fairmaire, 1893)
- Prosopocoilus romeoi Lacroix & Taroni, 1983
- Prosopocoilus rubens Didier, 1927
- Prosopocoilus rubrocastaneus Oberthür & Houlbert, 1914
- Prosopocoilus rusa Kriesche, 1920
- Prosopocoilus savagei (Hope, 1842)
- Prosopocoilus senegalensis (Klug, 1835)
- Prosopocoilus sericeus (Westwood, 1844)
- Prosopocoilus serricornis (Latreille, 1817)
- Prosopocoilus speciosus (Boileau, 1904)
- Prosopocoilus spectabilis (Ritsema, 1913)
- Prosopocoilus specularis Boileau, 1904
- Prosopocoilus spencei (Hope, 1840)
- Prosopocoilus spineus (Didier, 1927)
- Prosopocoilus sprebus (Bomans, 1971)
- Prosopocoilus squamilateris (Parry, 1862)
- Prosopocoilus suturalis (Olivier, 1789)
- Prosopocoilus suevuei Bomans, 1993
- Prosopocoilus suzumurai Nagai, 2000
- Prosopocoilus swanzyanus (Parry, 1870)
- Prosopocoilus sylvicapra Kriesche, 1932
- Prosopocoilus talsalis Ritsema, 1892
- Prosopocoilus tangianus (Didier & Séguy, 1953)
- Prosopocoilus tesserarius (Herbst, 1790)
- Prosopocoilus tigrinus Didier, 1928
- Prosopocoilus torresensis (Deyrolle, 1870)
- Prosopocoilus tragulus (Vollenhoven, 1861)
- Prosopocoilus umhangi (Fairmaire, 1891)
- Prosopocoilus valgipes Kriesche, 1940
- Prosopocoilus variegatus (Boileau, 1904)
- Prosopocoilus viossati Bomans, 1987
- Prosopocoilus wallacei (Parry, 1862)
- Prosopocoilus werneri Bomans, 1999
- Prosopocoilus wimberleyi Parry, 1875
- Prosopocoilus yasusukei H. Ikeda, 1996
- Prosopocoilus zebra (Olivier, 1789)
