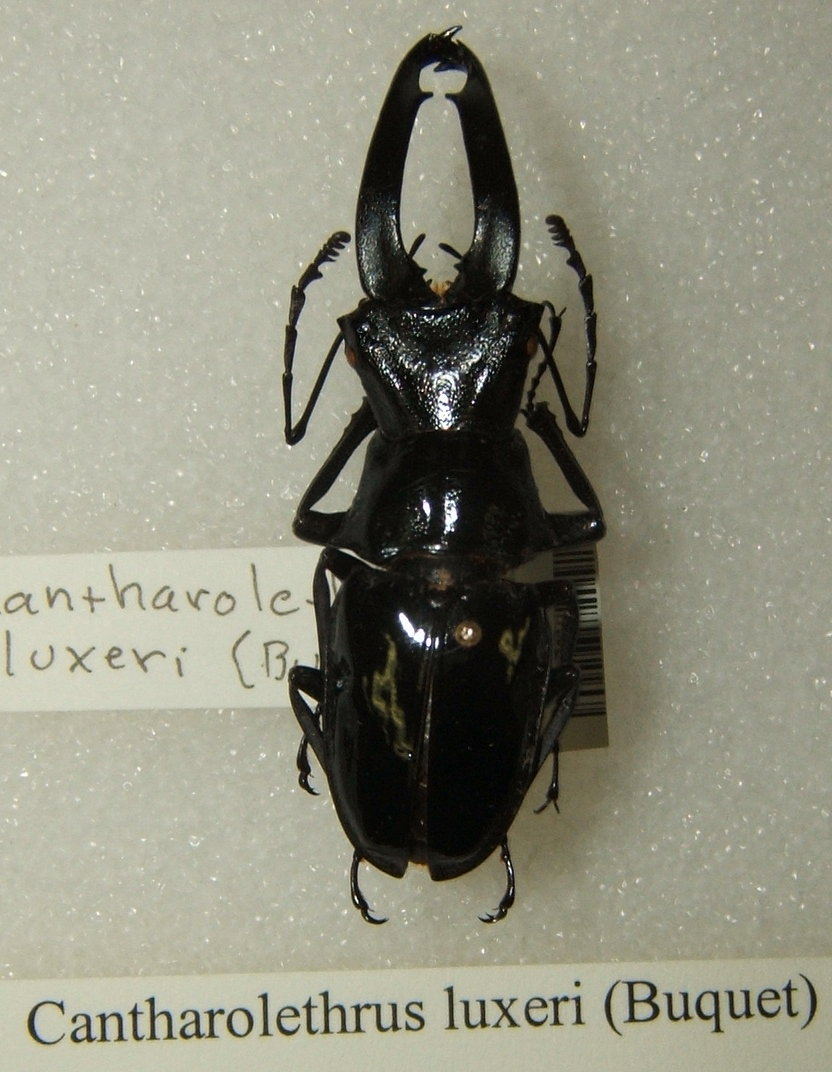
- Cantharolethrus luxerii, adult

Scientific classification
- Kingdom: Animalia
- Phylum: Arthropoda
- Clade: Pancrustacea
- Class: Insecta
- Order: Coleoptera
- Suborder: Polyphaga
- Infraorder: Scarabaeiformia
- Family: Lucanidae
- Genus: Cantharolethrus
- Species: C. luxerii

Binomial name
- Cantharolethrus luxerii (Buquet, 1843)

Synonyms
- Dorcus luxerii Buquet, 1843

= Cantharolethrus luxerii =

Species of beetle

Cantharolethrus luxerii is a species of stag beetle. It is found in Central (Costa Rica, Panama) and South America (Colombia, Ecuador).

It can be split in two subspecies:

- Cantharolethrus luxerii luxerii (Buquet, 1843)
- Cantharolethrus luxerii inflexus Boileau, 1899
