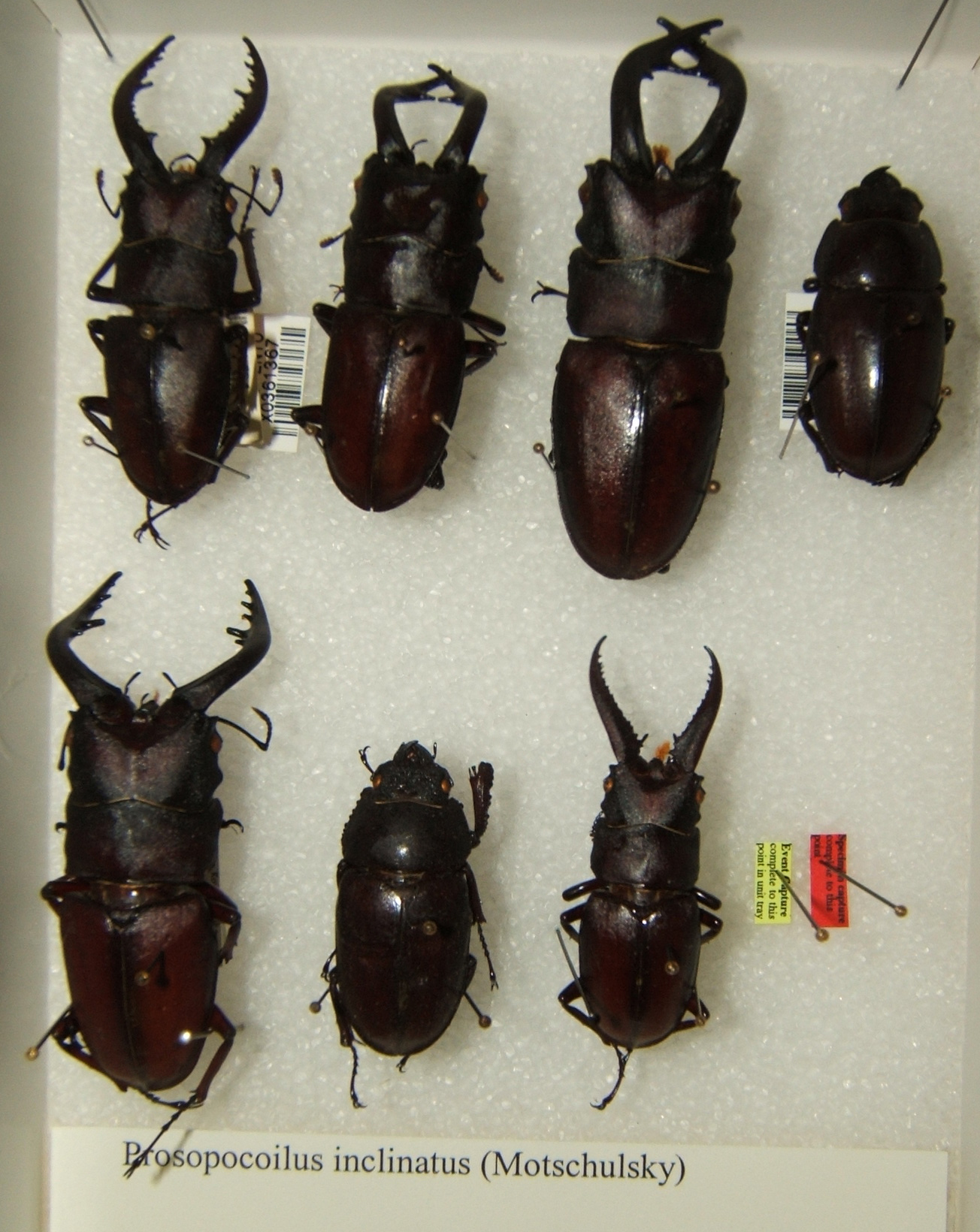
- Prosopocoilus inclinatus, adult

Scientific classification
- Kingdom: Animalia
- Phylum: Arthropoda
- Clade: Pancrustacea
- Class: Insecta
- Order: Coleoptera
- Suborder: Polyphaga
- Infraorder: Scarabaeiformia
- Family: Lucanidae
- Genus: Prosopocoilus
- Species: P. inclinatus

Binomial name
- Prosopocoilus inclinatus (Motschulsky, 1857)

= Prosopocoilus inclinatus =

Japanese Stag Beetle, Saw Stag Beetle

Species of beetle

Prosopocoilus inclinatus, the Japanese stag beetle, is a beetle of the Family Lucanidae found throughout Japan (Hokkaido, Honshu, Shikoku, Kyushu, Sado Island, Tsushima, Yaku Island) and the Korean peninsula.

== Description ==
Japanese stag beetles are large, smooth, dark brown to red brown beetles, measuring 26 to 75 mm in length. Males are larger than the females and have mandibles which are enlarged and much longer than the female's.

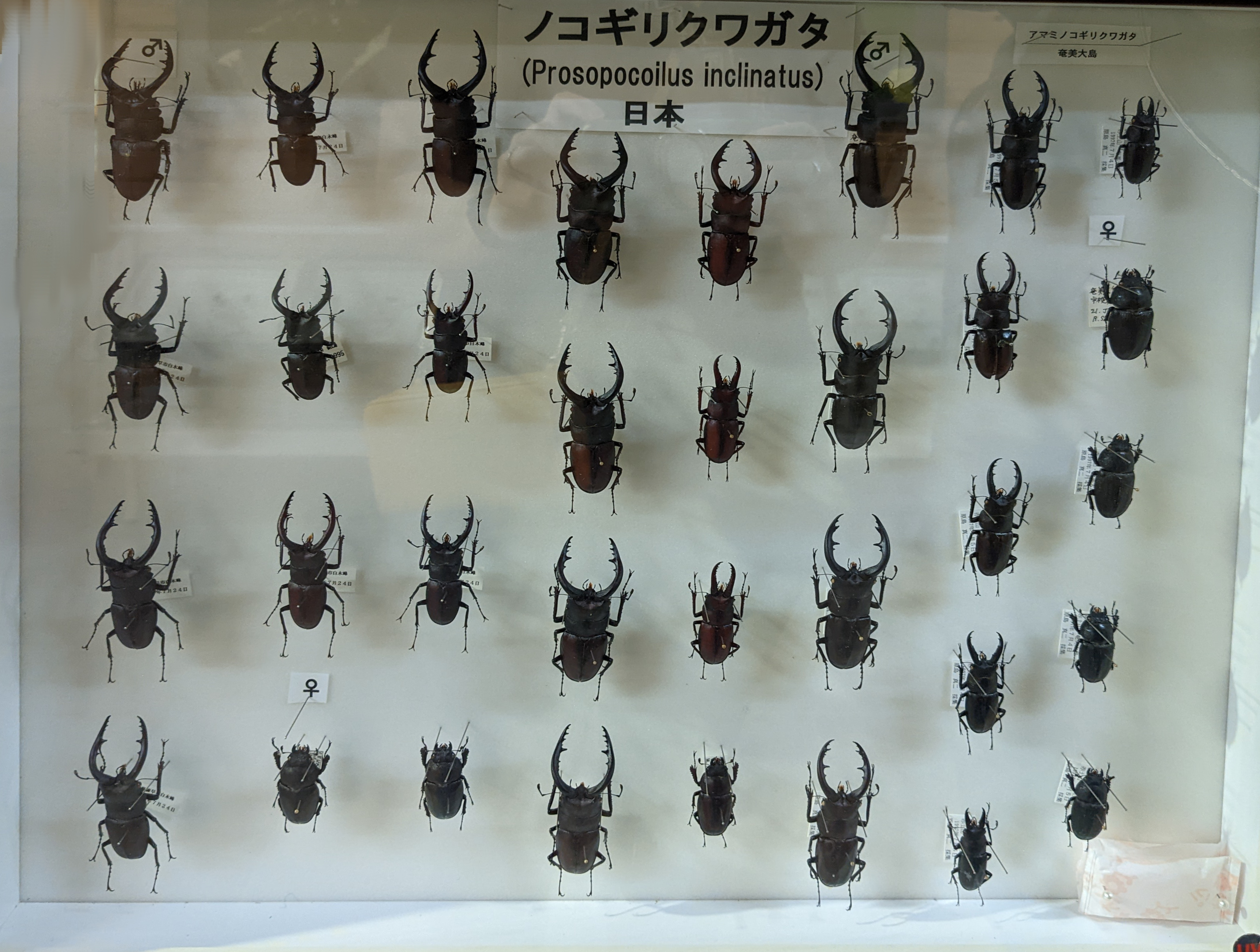
