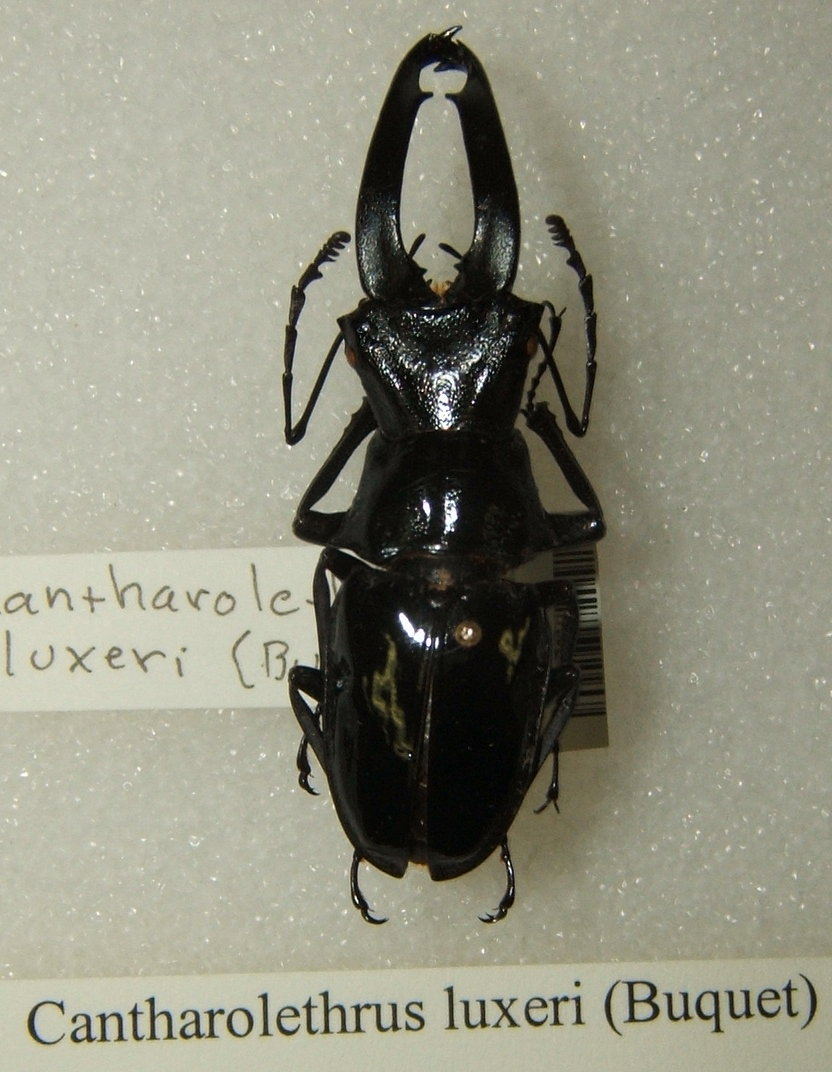
- Cantharolethrus luxerii

Scientific classification
- Domain: Eukaryota
- Kingdom: Animalia
- Phylum: Arthropoda
- Class: Insecta
- Order: Coleoptera
- Suborder: Polyphaga
- Infraorder: Scarabaeiformia
- Family: Lucanidae
- Subfamily: Lucaninae
- Tribe: Sclerostomini
- Genus: Cantharolethrus; Thomson, 1862

= Cantharolethrus =

Genus of stag beetles

Cantharolethrus is a genus of stag beetles in the subfamily Lucaninae. It is found from Mexico to South America.

== Species ==
There are about six recognized species:

- Cantharolethrus azambrei Boileau, 1897
- Cantharolethrus buckleyi Parry, 1872
- Cantharolethrus homoderoides Kriesche, 1928
- Cantharolethrus luxerii (Buquet, 1843)
- Cantharolethrus peruvianus Heller, 1918
- Cantharolethrus steinheili Parry, 1875

BioLib recognizes Cantharolethrus elongatus Lacroix, 1982 as a valid species, whereas other sources treat it as a synonym of Cantharolethrus peruvianus.
