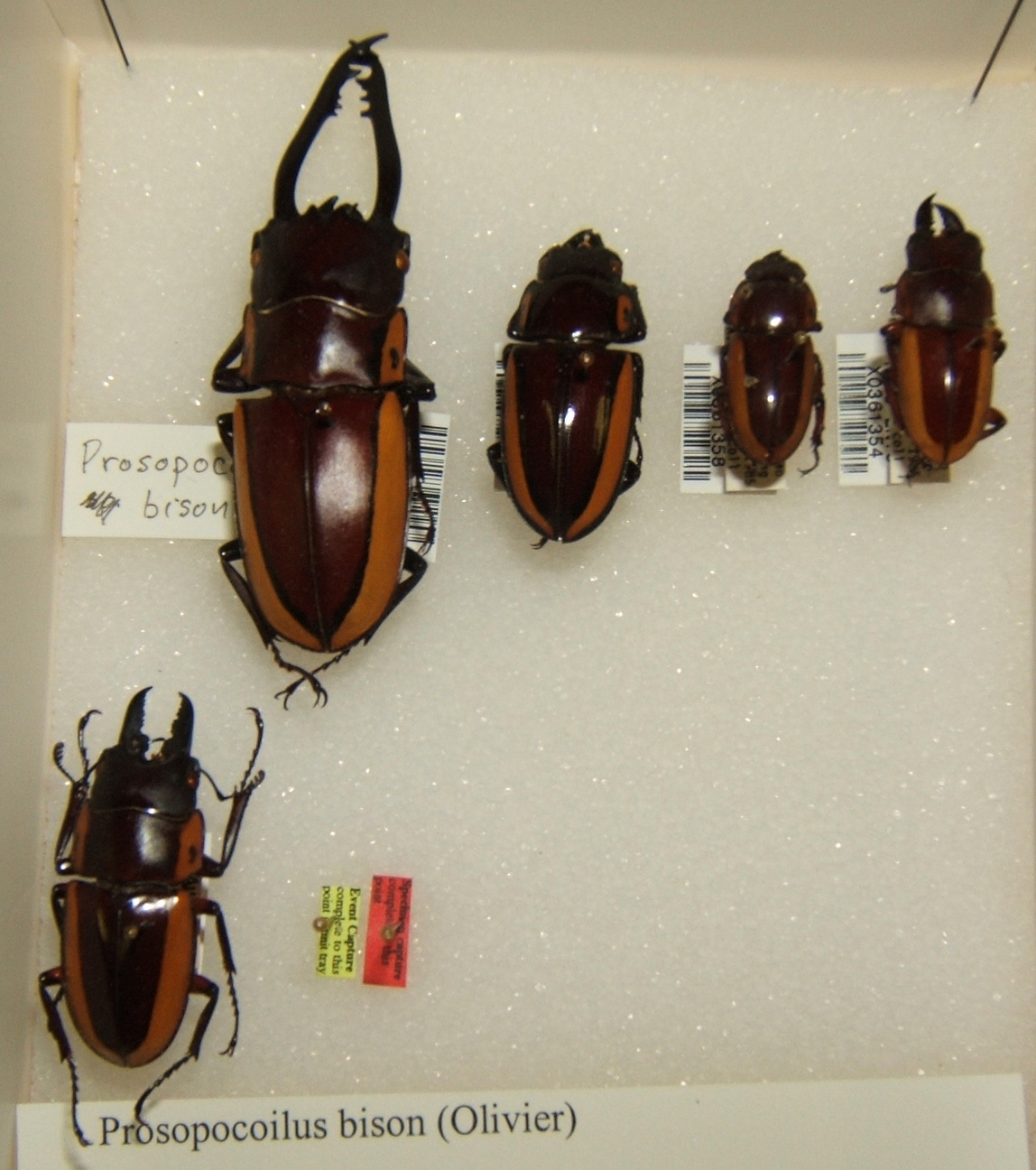
- Prosopocoilus bison, adult

Scientific classification
- Kingdom: Animalia
- Phylum: Arthropoda
- Clade: Pancrustacea
- Class: Insecta
- Order: Coleoptera
- Suborder: Polyphaga
- Infraorder: Scarabaeiformia
- Family: Lucanidae
- Genus: Prosopocoilus
- Species: P. bison

Binomial name
- Prosopocoilus bison (Olivier, 1789)

= Prosopocoilus bison =

Species of beetle

Prosopocoilus bison is a beetle of the family Lucanidae.

== Subspecies ==
- Prosopocoilus bison bison
- Prosopocoilus bison buruensis
- Prosopocoilus bison hortensis
- Prosopocoilus bison magnificus
- Prosopocoilus bison tesserarius
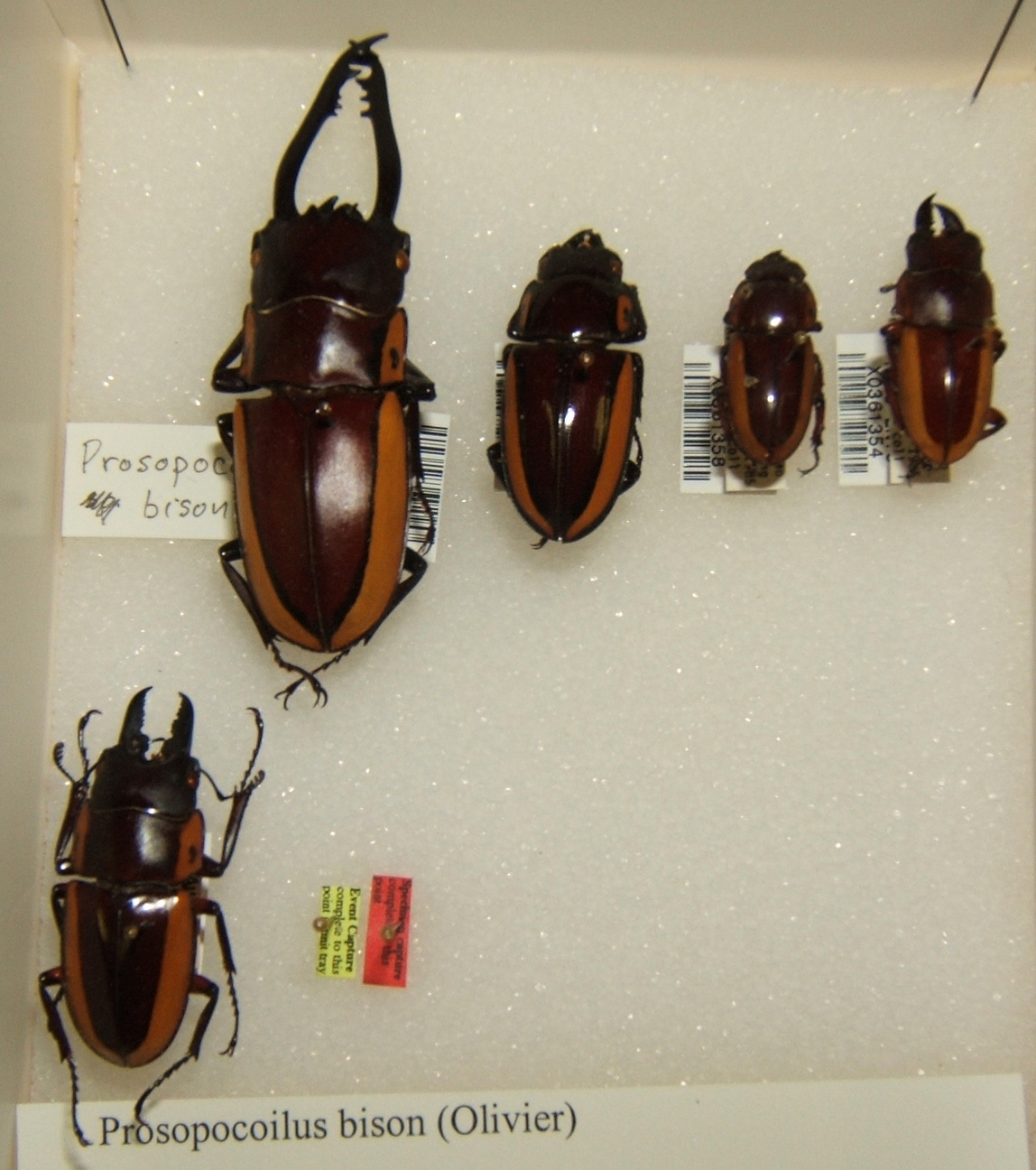
Prosopocoilus bison

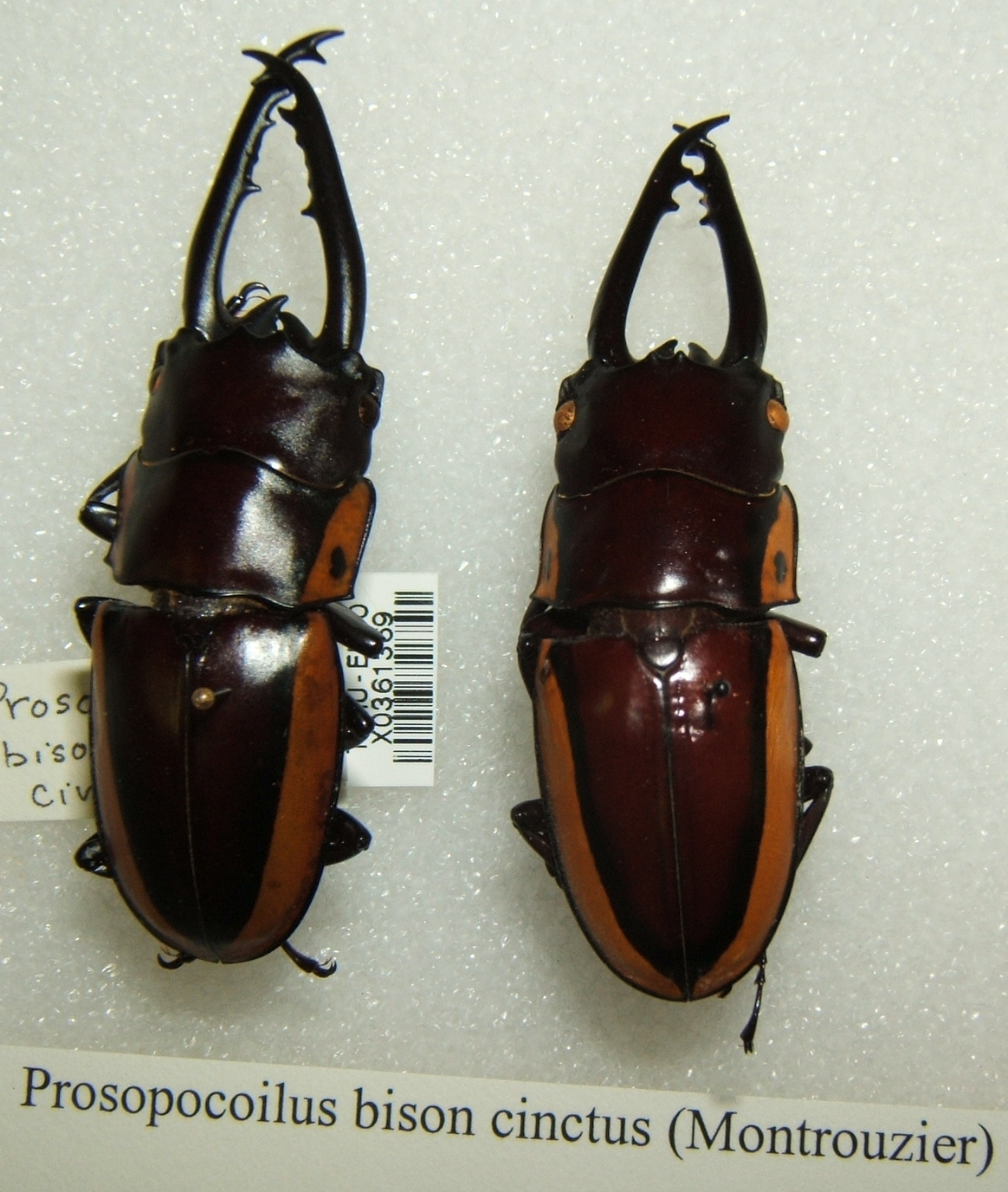
Prosopocoilus bison cinctus
