= Nicagus obscurus =

Scientific classification
- Domain: Eukaryota
- Kingdom: Animalia
- Phylum: Arthropoda
- Class: Insecta
- Order: Coleoptera
- Suborder: Polyphaga
- Infraorder: Scarabaeiformia
- Family: Lucanidae
- Genus: Nicagus
- Species: N. obscurus

Binomial name
- Nicagus obscurus (LeConte, 1847)

Species of beetle

Nicagus obscurus is a species of stag beetle in the family Lucanidae. It is found in North America. Larvae can be found in the grooves of aspen driftwood. Adults emerge in August.
