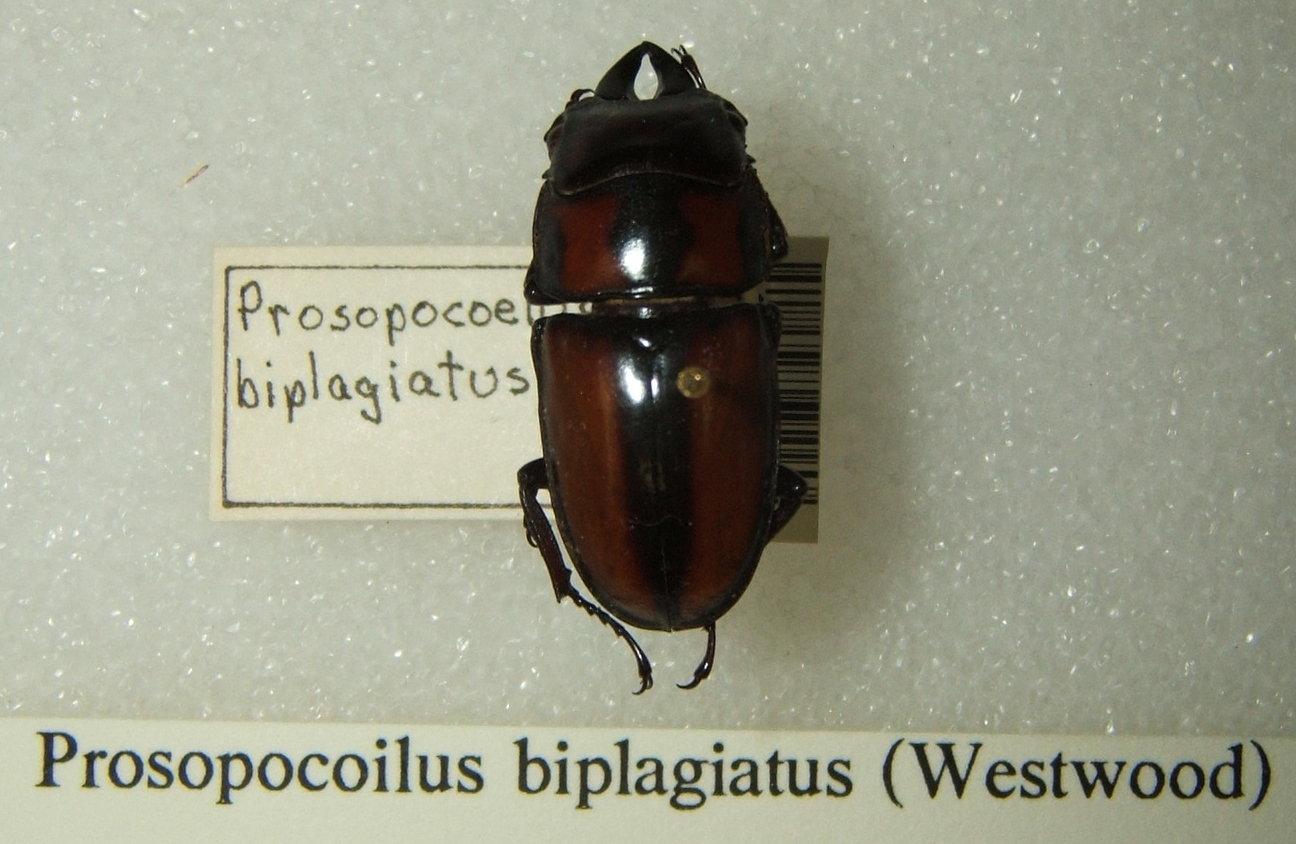
- Prosopocoilus biplagiatus, adult

Scientific classification
- Kingdom: Animalia
- Phylum: Arthropoda
- Clade: Pancrustacea
- Class: Insecta
- Order: Coleoptera
- Suborder: Polyphaga
- Infraorder: Scarabaeiformia
- Family: Lucanidae
- Genus: Prosopocoilus
- Species: P. biplagiatus

Binomial name
- Prosopocoilus biplagiatus (Westwood, 1855)

= Prosopocoilus biplagiatus =

Species of beetle

Prosopocoilus biplagiatus is a beetle of the family Lucanidae. Size of males: 18 – 39 mm, females: 18 – 25 mm.
