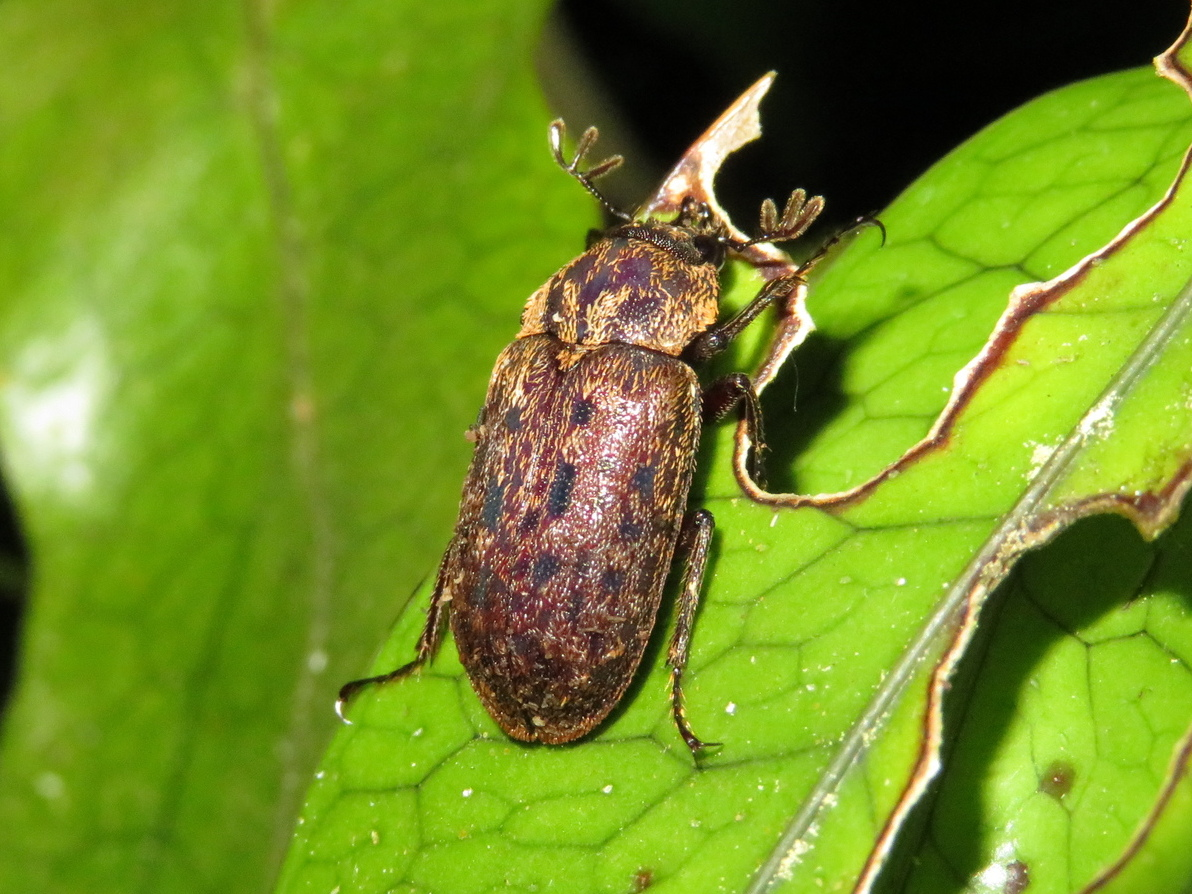

Scientific classification
- Domain: Eukaryota
- Kingdom: Animalia
- Phylum: Arthropoda
- Class: Insecta
- Order: Coleoptera
- Suborder: Polyphaga
- Infraorder: Scarabaeiformia
- Family: Lucanidae
- Genus: Mitophyllus
- Species: M. parrianus

Binomial name
- Mitophyllus parrianus Westwood, 1863

= Mitophyllus parrianus =

Species of beetle

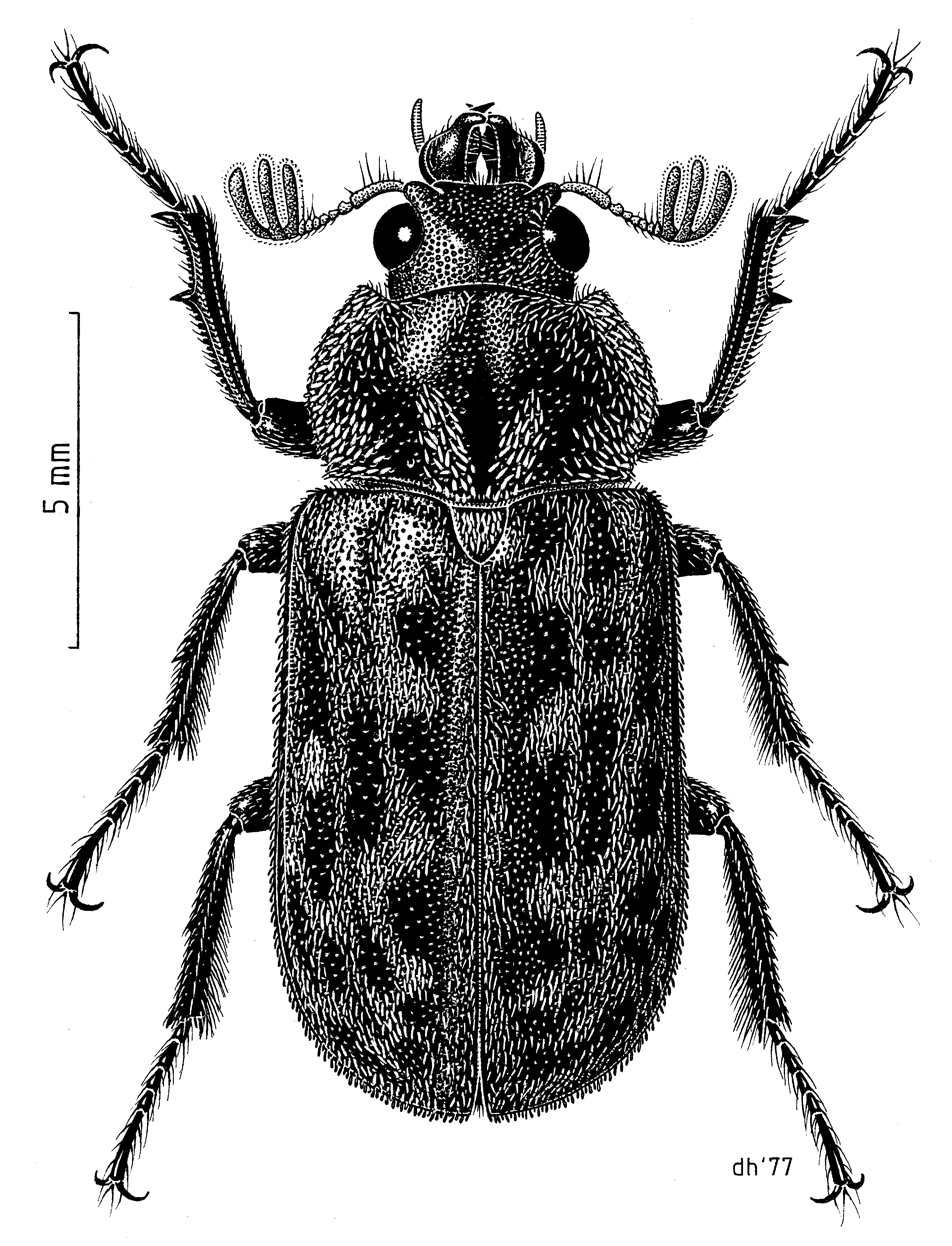
Illustration by Des Helmore

Mitophyllus parrianus, is a species of stag beetle native to New Zealand. M. parrianus is found throughout the North, South and Stewart Islands of New Zealand.
