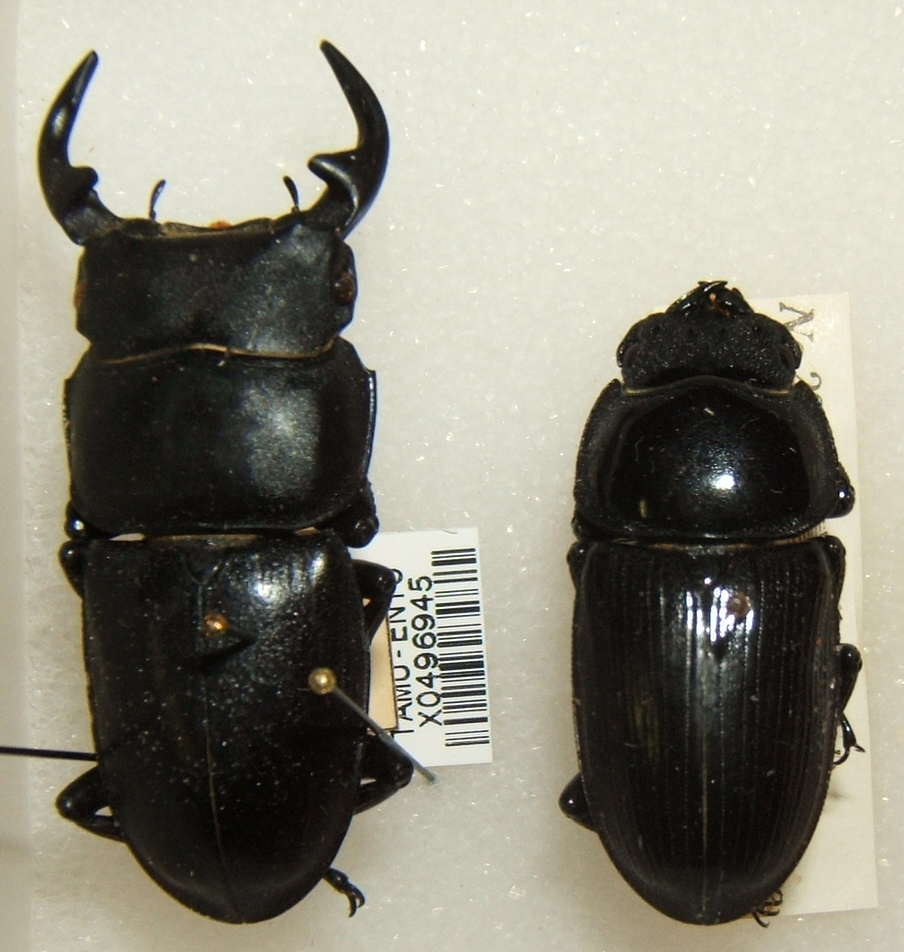
- Adult pinned specimens

Scientific classification
- Kingdom: Animalia
- Phylum: Arthropoda
- Class: Insecta
- Order: Coleoptera
- Suborder: Polyphaga
- Infraorder: Scarabaeiformia
- Family: Lucanidae
- Genus: Dorcus
- Species: D. curvidens

Binomial name
- Dorcus curvidens (Hope, 1840)

= Dorcus curvidens =

Species of stag beetle

Dorcus curvidens is a species of stag beetle.
