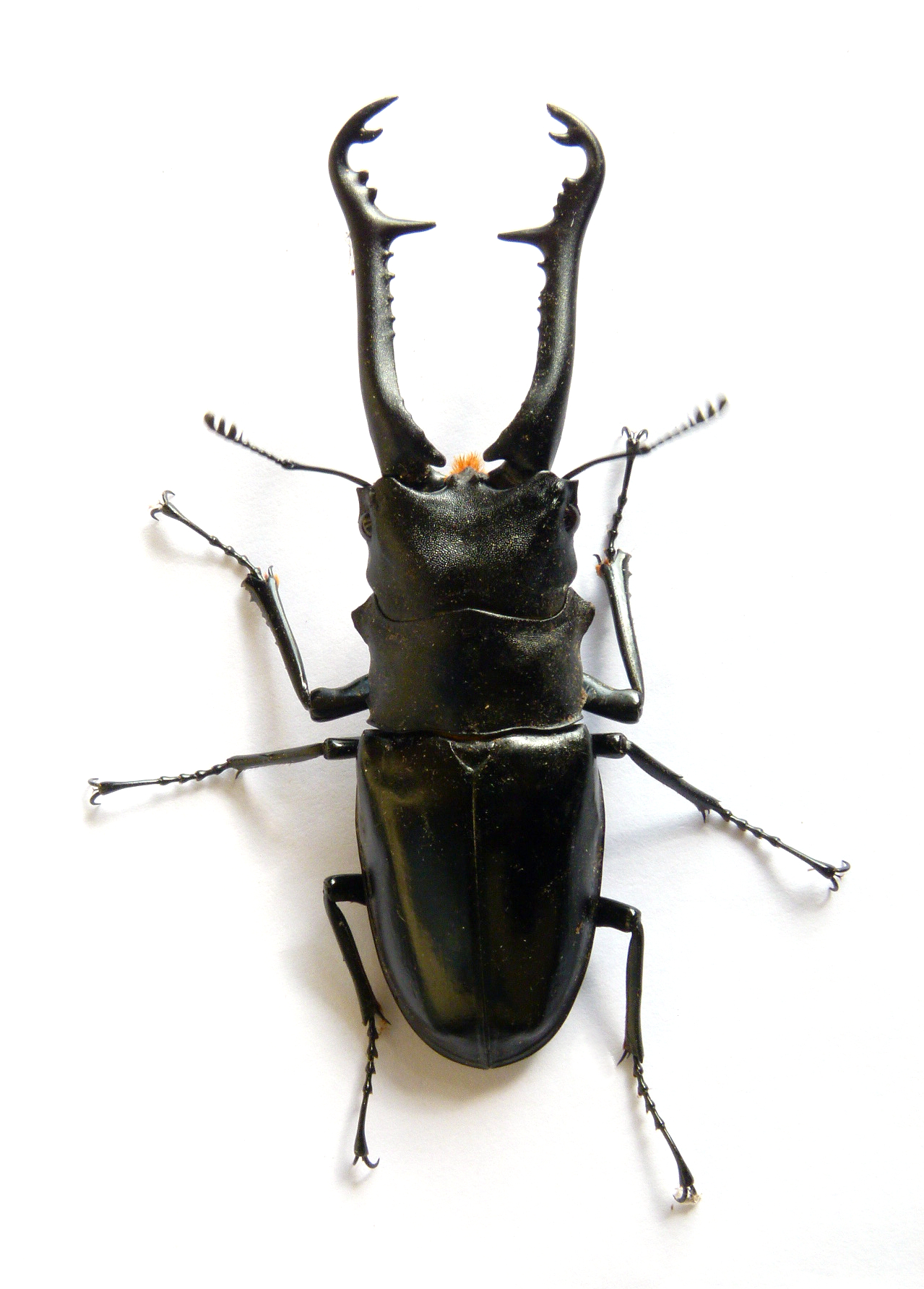
- P. g. nilgiriensis from southern India

Scientific classification
- Kingdom: Animalia
- Phylum: Arthropoda
- Clade: Pancrustacea
- Class: Insecta
- Order: Coleoptera
- Suborder: Polyphaga
- Infraorder: Scarabaeiformia
- Family: Lucanidae
- Genus: Prosopocoilus
- Species: P. giraffa

Binomial name
- Prosopocoilus giraffa Olivier, 1789

= Prosopocoilus giraffa =

Giraffe stag beetle

Species of beetle

Prosopocoilus giraffa, the giraffe stag beetle, is the world's largest stag beetle and is a member of the family Lucanidae within the order Coleoptera. They have very long, toothed and notched mandibles that protrude about half the size of their body. They tend to be aggressive and are fierce and powerful. Males fight each other using these strong and enlarged jaws to lift and throw rivals to win a mate. They can grow up to 119 millimetres in length. Several distinctive populations (subspecies) are found in moist forested region areas of Asia, ranging from India to Indonesia. Prosopocoilus giraffa keisukei can measure up to 12 centimeters. Prosopocoilus giraffa daisukei have the brightest elytra of all subspecies and Prosopocoilus giraffa giraffa is the smallest subspecies.

== List of subspecies ==
- Prosopocoilus giraffa borobudur Mizunuma & Nagai, 1991 (Sumatra, Java and Bali Is.)
- Prosopocoilus giraffa daisukei Mizunuma & Nagai, 1991 (Negros and Sibuyan Is.)
- Prosopocoilus giraffa giraffa Olivier, 1789 (Malaysia, Thailand, Vietnam, Nepal, Myanmar, Laos, Bhutan, Cambodia and India)
- Prosopocoilus giraffa keisukei Mizunuma & Nagai, 1991 (Flores Is., Lombok Is.)
- Prosopocoilus giraffa makatai Mizunuma & Nagai, 1991 (Philippines - Mindoro, Luzon)
- Prosopocoilus giraffa nilgiriensis Mizunuma & Nagai, 1991 (S. India)
- Prosopocoilus giraffa nishikawai Mizunuma & Nagai, 1991 (Sangir Is.)
- Prosopocoilus giraffa nishiyamai Mizunuma & Nagai, 1991 (Sulawesi)
- Prosopocoilus giraffa timorensis Mizunuma & Nagai, 1991 (Timor Is.)
