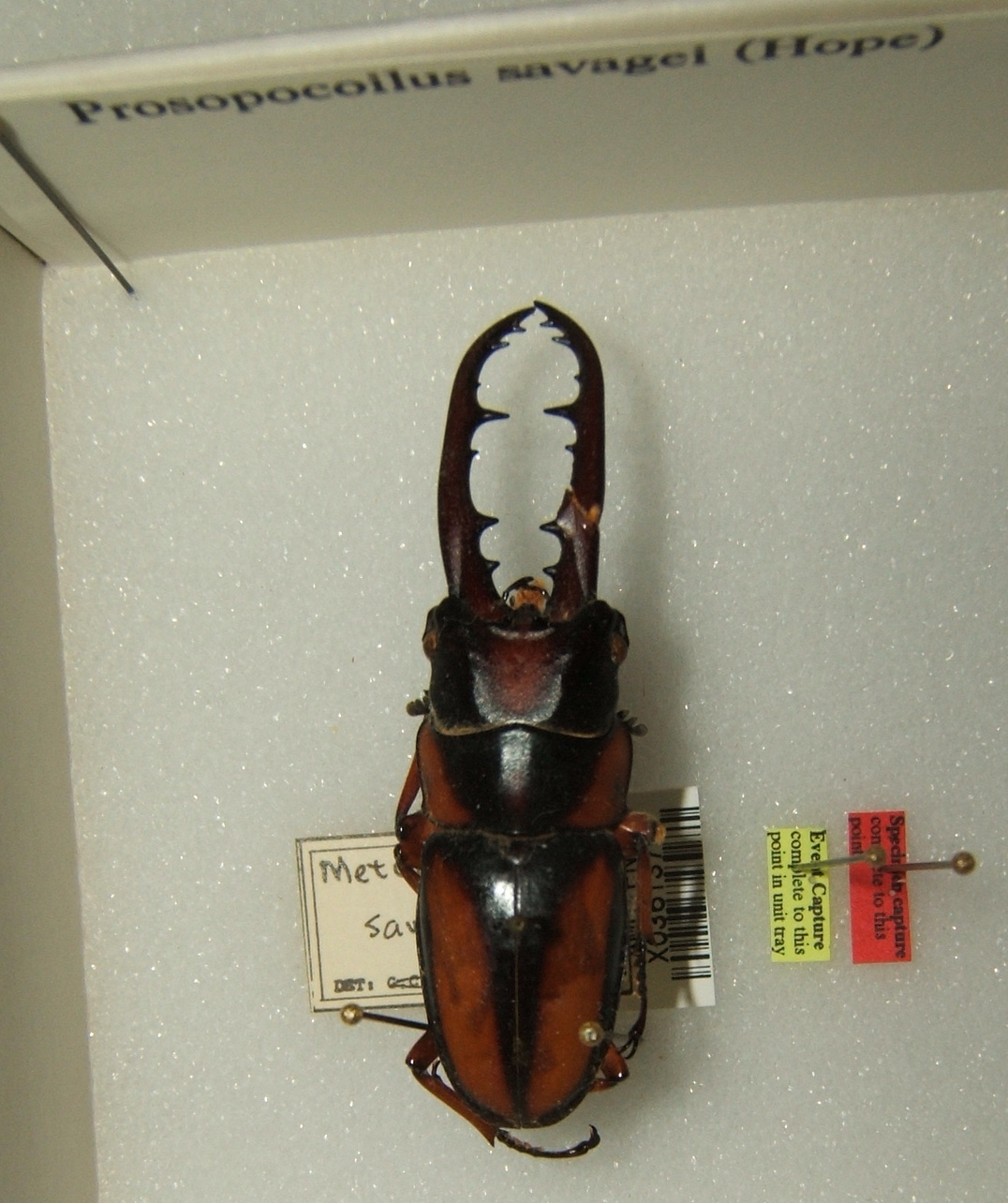
- Prosopocoilus savagei, adult

Scientific classification
- Kingdom: Animalia
- Phylum: Arthropoda
- Clade: Pancrustacea
- Class: Insecta
- Order: Coleoptera
- Suborder: Polyphaga
- Infraorder: Scarabaeiformia
- Family: Lucanidae
- Genus: Prosopocoilus
- Species: P. savagei

Binomial name
- Prosopocoilus savagei (Hope)

= Prosopocoilus savagei =

Species of beetle

Prosopocoilus savagei is a beetle of the family Lucanidae. It is found in Central and East Africa. It measures about 24–65 mm in males and 21–31 mm in females.

== Description ==
This beetle is a shade of orange to brown, depending on its range. A black stripe runs down it from its head and pronotum to the bottom of the thorax narrowing as it goes along, the males possess large mandibles for battling for territory and mates and can reach 24–65 mm. A female will be 21-31mm, the larvae are a creamy yellow and feed on rotten wood. They reach around 25–36 mm in length and are voracious eaters taking a year to reach the pupal phase and 4 months to pupate. The adults live for around 8 months in captivity and most likely live less in the wild, they feed on ageing fruits and tree sap.

== Keeping them as pets ==
This beetle makes a good pet and can be kept using oakwood mulch and leaf litter substrate along with a rotten log for the females to lay eggs in. The adults feed on fruits and beetle jelly.
