= Wilhelm Möllenkamp =

German entomologist (1858–1917)

Wilhelm Möllenkamp (2 April 1858, Aurich - 29 November 1917, Nordern) was a German entomologist who specialised in Coleoptera especially Lucanidae.

Möllenkamp was an insect dealer in Dortmund. He wrote many short scientific papers describing new taxa, many in Insekten-Börse a part scientific part trade entomological journal published by Alfred Kernen in Stuttgart.
