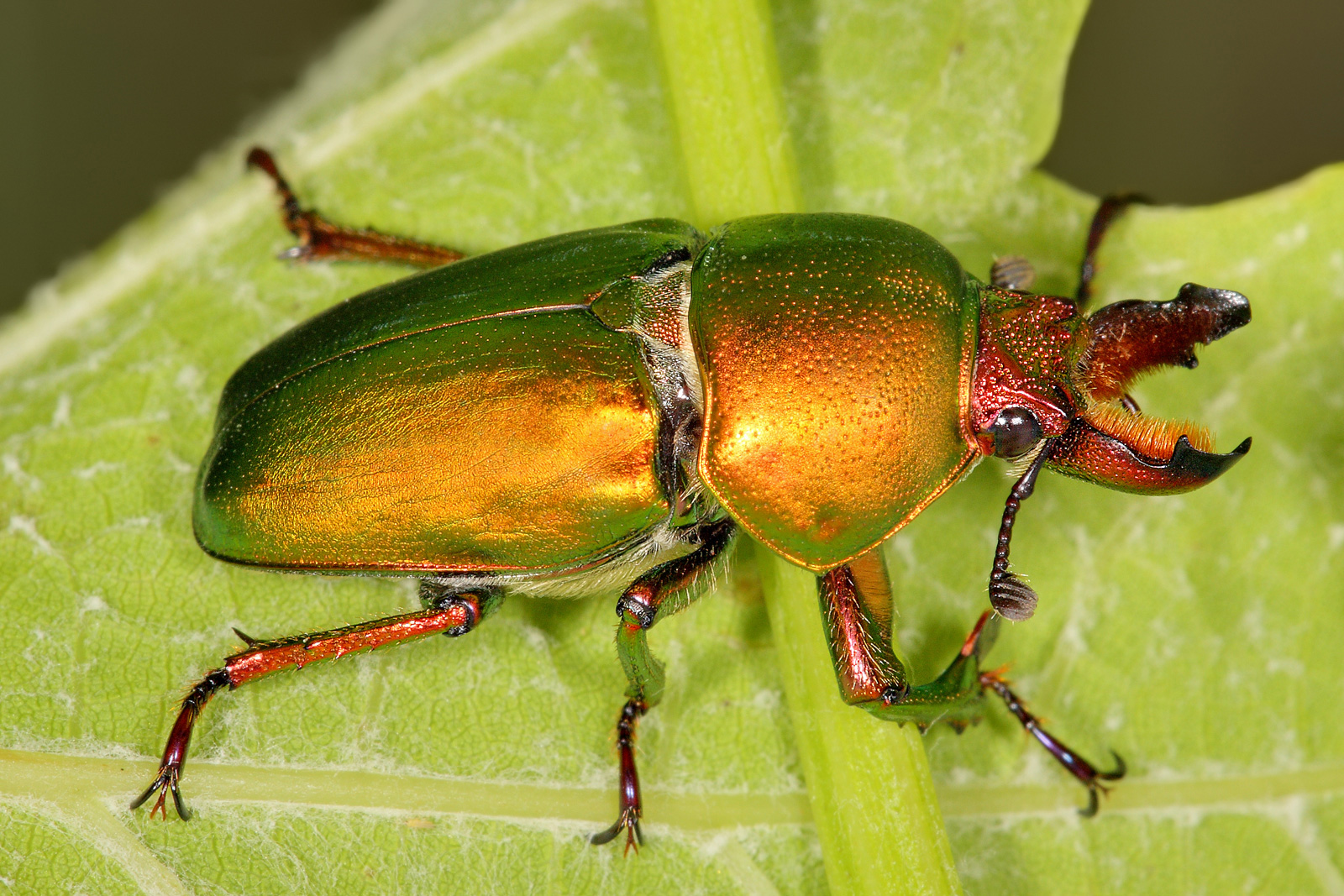
- A male specimen of Lamprima aurata, the golden stag beetle

Scientific classification
- Kingdom: Animalia
- Phylum: Arthropoda
- Clade: Pancrustacea
- Class: Insecta
- Order: Coleoptera
- Suborder: Polyphaga
- Infraorder: Scarabaeiformia
- Superfamily: Scarabaeoidea
- Family: Lucanidae; Latreille, 1804

Subfamilies
- Aesalinae; Lampriminae; Lucaninae; Syndesinae

= Stag beetle =

Stag beetle Temporal range: Middle Jurassic–Recent

Family of insects

Stag beetles compose the family Lucanidae. It has about 1,200 species of beetles in four subfamilies. Some species grow to over 12 centimetres (4 1/2 inches), but most to about 5 cm (2 in).

== Overview ==
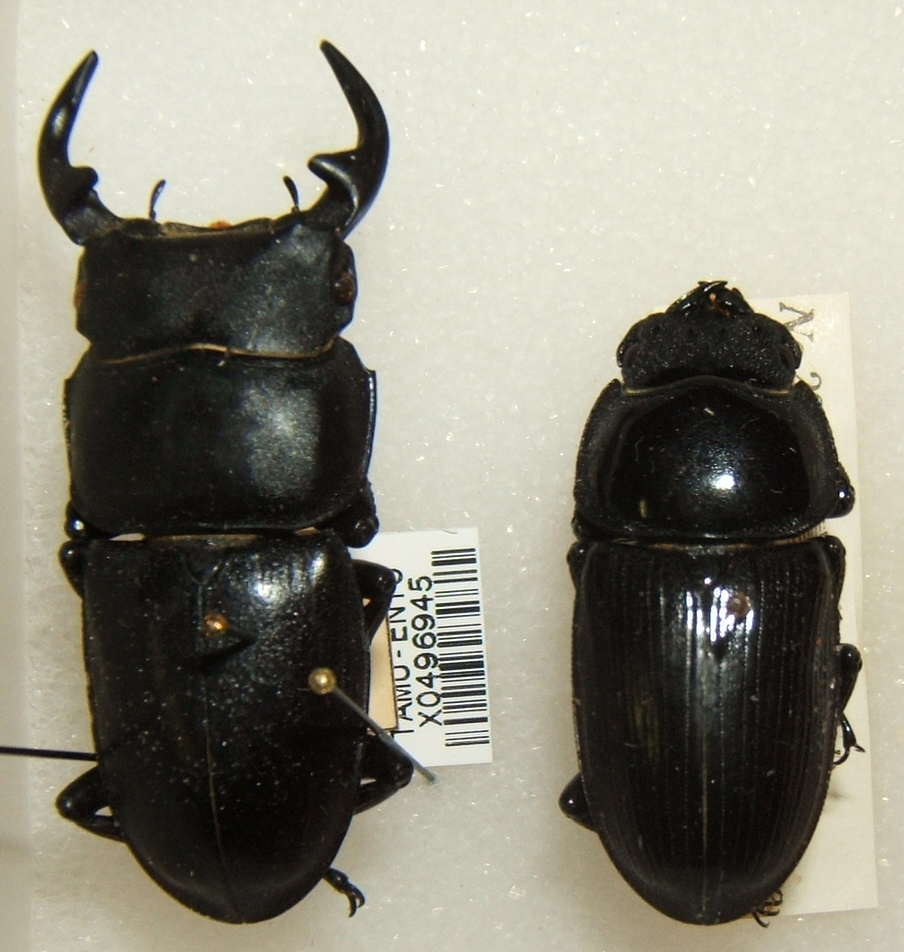
Dorcus curvidens male (left) and female (right)

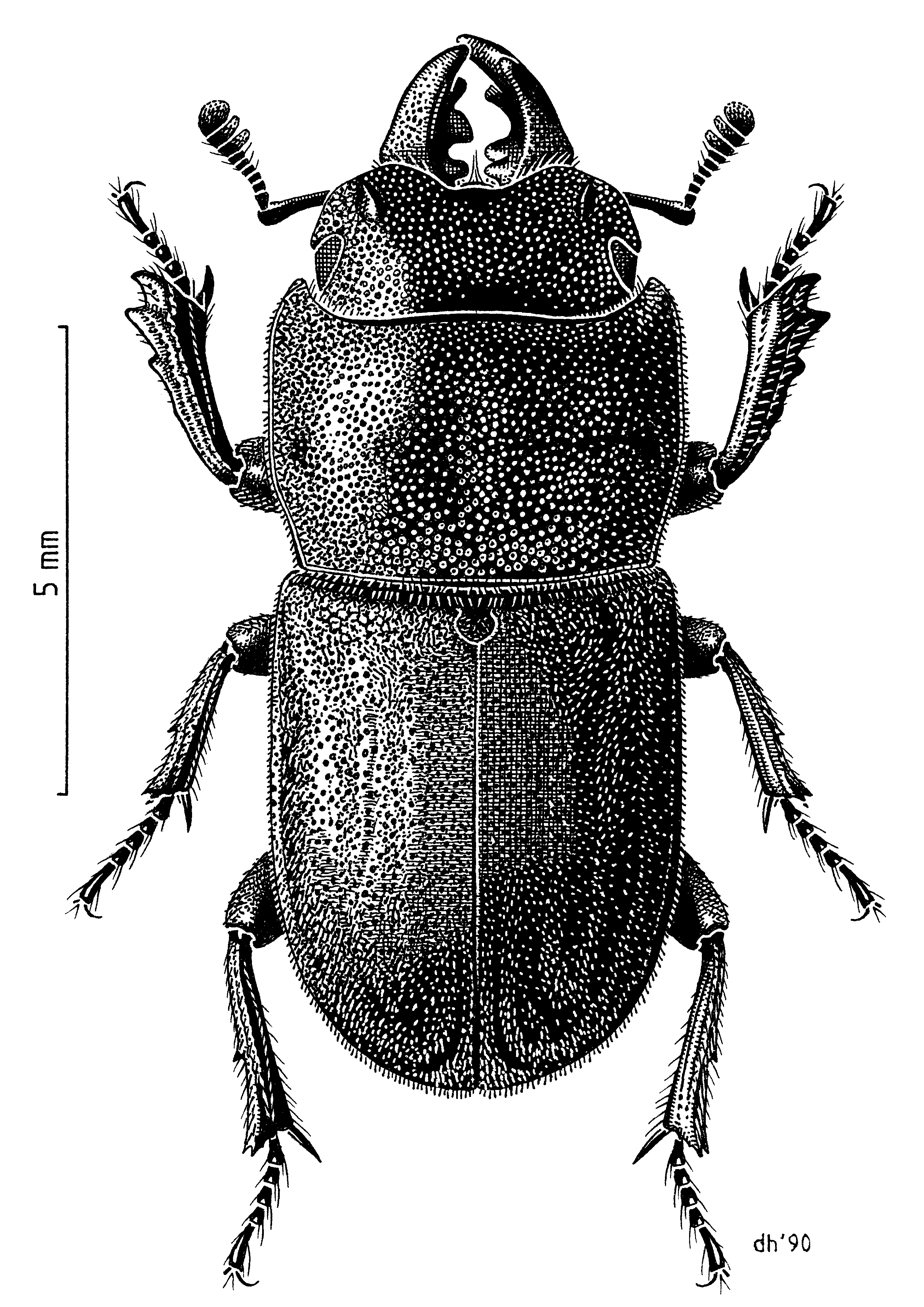
Paralissotes sp. illustrated by Des Helmore

The English name is derived from the large and distinctive mandibles found on the males of most species, which resemble the antlers of stags.

A well-known species in much of Europe is Lucanus cervus, referred to in some European countries (including the United Kingdom) as the stag beetle, or the thunder beetle; it is the largest terrestrial insect in Europe. Pliny the Elder noted that Nigidius called the beetle lucanus after the Italian region of Lucania where they were used as amulets. The scientific name of Lucanus cervus adds cervus, deer.

Male stag beetles are known for their oversized mandibles that are used to wrestle each other for favoured mating sites in a way that parallels how stags fight over females. Fights may also be over food, such as tree sap and decaying fruits. During a battle between two males, a stag beetle's main objective is to dislodge its opponent's tarsal claws with its mandible, thus disrupting their balance. Despite their often fearsome appearance, they are not typically aggressive to humans. Because its mandibles are capable of exceeding its own body size, stag beetles are generally inefficient runners and are very slow, typically feeling the need to fly from one location to another.

Female stag beetles are usually smaller than the males, with smaller mandibles that are much more powerful than the males'. As larvae, females are distinguished by their cream-colored fat ovaries visible through the skin around two-thirds of the way down their back.

The larvae feed for several years on rotting wood, growing through three larval stages until eventually pupating inside a pupal cell constructed from surrounding wood pieces and soil particles. In the final larval stage, "L3", the surviving grubs of larger species, such as Prosopocoilus giraffa, may be the size of a human finger.

In England's New Forest, it was once believed that the stag beetle, dubbed the "devil's imp", was sent to antagonize corn crops. The superstition led to stoning the insects on sight, as observed by a writer in the Notes and Queries. Along with rhinoceros beetles, stag beetles are often bought as pets in Asia.

== Evolution ==
The oldest known fossil of the group is Juraesalus from the late Middle Jurassic (Callovian) Daohugou Beds of Inner Mongolia, China. While initially interpreted as a member of Aesalinae, it was later interpreted to be a basal member of the family. Litholamprima, the only genus in the subfamily Litholampriminae, is known from the Lower Cretaceous of Yixian Formation, China.

== Mandible allometry ==
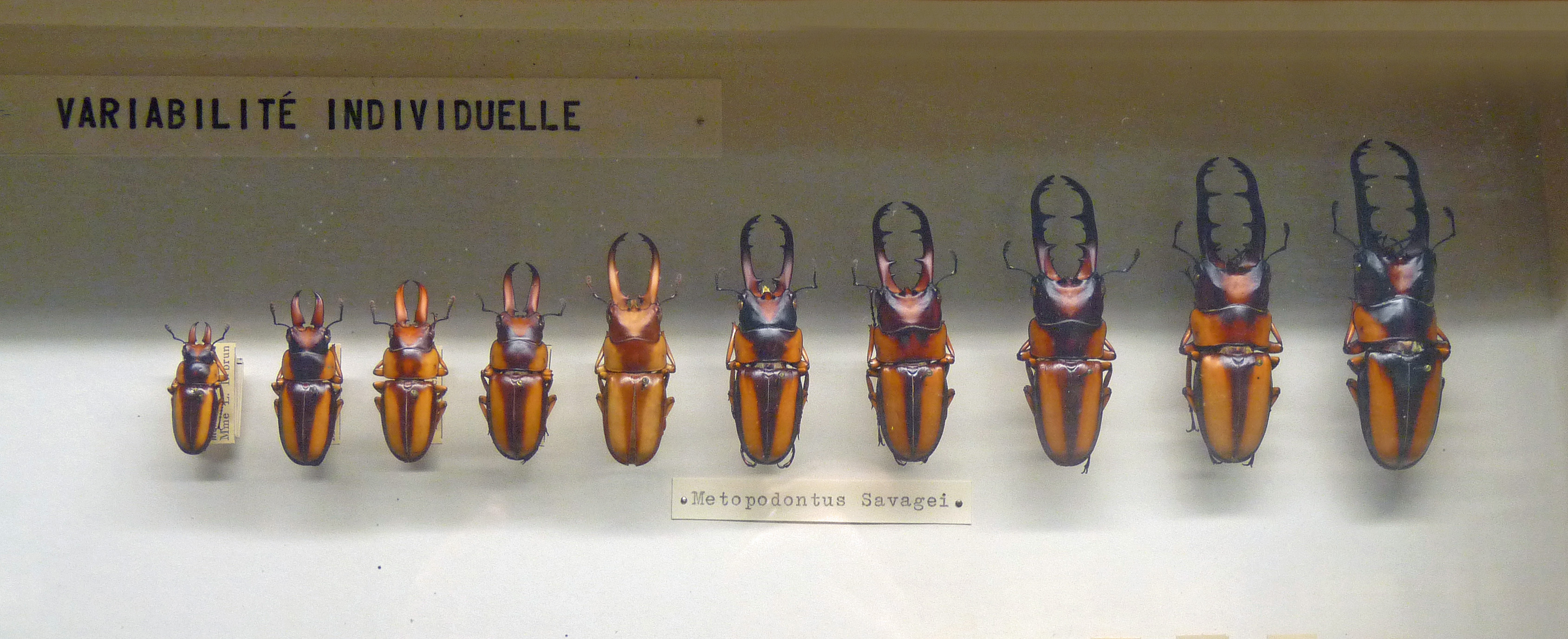
Mandible allometry in Prosopocoilus savagei

Lucanid males have large mandibles. Their size often varies among individuals. Such variation is termed a scaling relationship or static allometry. Environmental conditions and genetic factors affect mandible size. They often have mandibles proportional to their elytron lengths.
