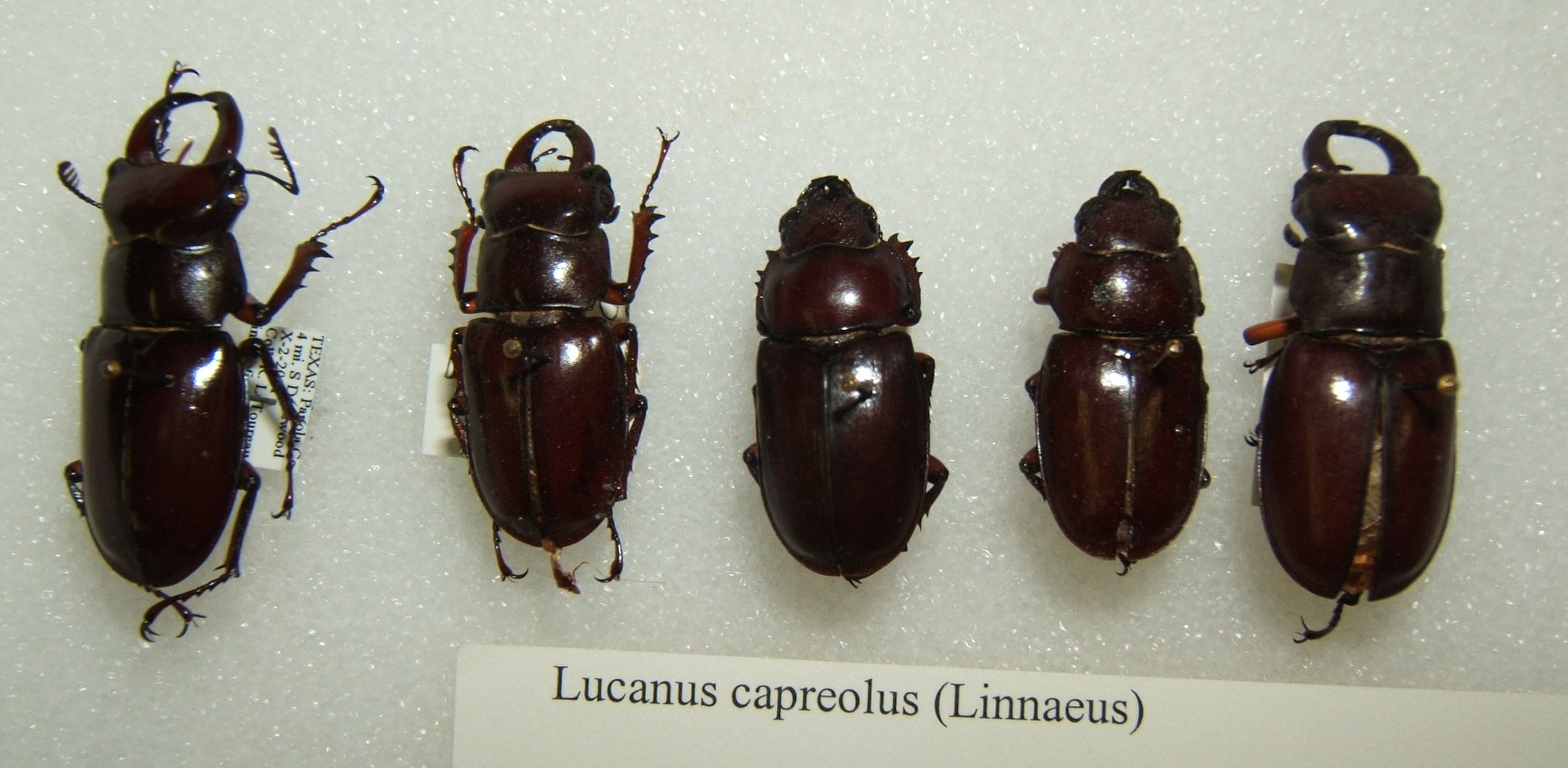
- Adult males and females

Scientific classification
- Kingdom: Animalia
- Phylum: Arthropoda
- Clade: Pancrustacea
- Class: Insecta
- Order: Coleoptera
- Suborder: Polyphaga
- Infraorder: Scarabaeiformia
- Family: Lucanidae
- Genus: Lucanus
- Species: L. capreolus

Binomial name
- Lucanus capreolus (Linnaeus, 1763)

= Lucanus capreolus =

Species of beetle

Lucanus capreolus, the reddish-brown stag beetle or pinching beetle, is a beetle of the family Lucanidae. The specific name capreolus is derived from Latin, meaning "roe deer" (capreolus literally means "little goat"). The name refers to the resemblance of the mandibles to deer antlers.

== Description ==
A relatively large lucanid beetle of the genus Lucanus, the male has long, curved upper jaws, resembling a sickle. The larvae are found in the trunks of old trees, feeding on the inner wood. It is dark reddish brown with smooth, shiny elytra (“wing cases”); the femora are orange brown. Males have much larger jaws than females. Jaws of males are not as large as those of Lucanus elaphus. The smaller L. placidus has two or more teeth on its jaws and has dark femora. It is 22–35 mm long.

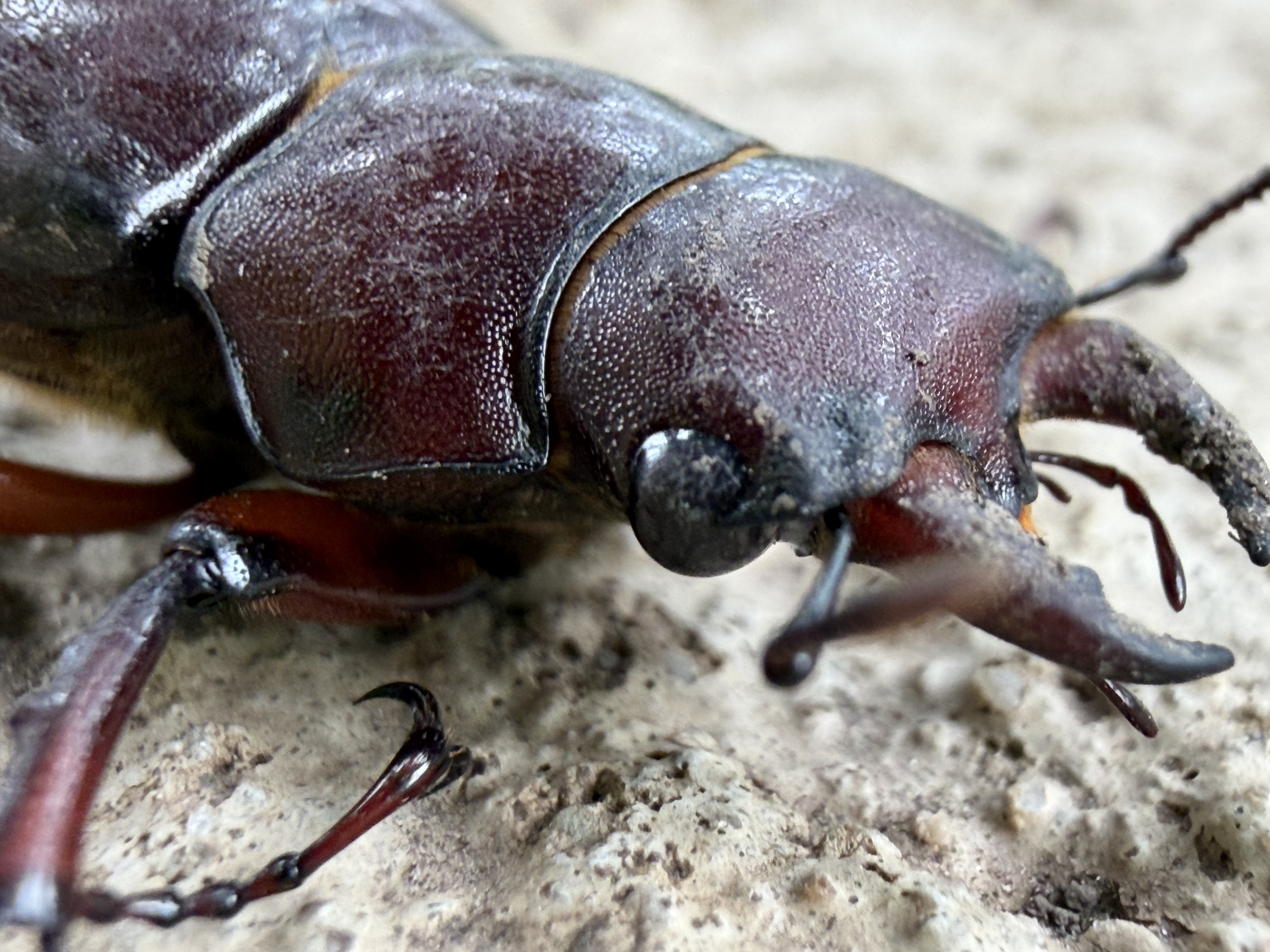
Lucanus capreolus

The species was originally described by Carl Linnaeus as Scarabaeus capreolus in his 1763 Centuria Insectorum. (orig. comb.). Other known synonyms are:

- L. dama Fabricius 1775: 2.
- L. trigonus Thunberg, 1806: 199.
- L. muticus Thunberg, 1806: 205.

As with most of the species of the Lucanidae, sexual dimorphism is pronounced, and the male of Lucanus capreolus is larger than the female and armed with mandibles in the form of antlers.

== Habitat ==
It lives in deciduous forests and adjacent areas in the eastern United States and some parts of Canada. It can be found around decaying logs and stumps, where it breeds. Males use mandibles to fight at breeding sites. Eggs are deposited in rotting wood. Larvae live in decaying wood of deciduous trees. Larvae reportedly take two years to develop, and pupate in nearby soil. They are attracted to lights at night. They have been found in captivity to make burrows and nest in soil and mulch.

== Gallery ==
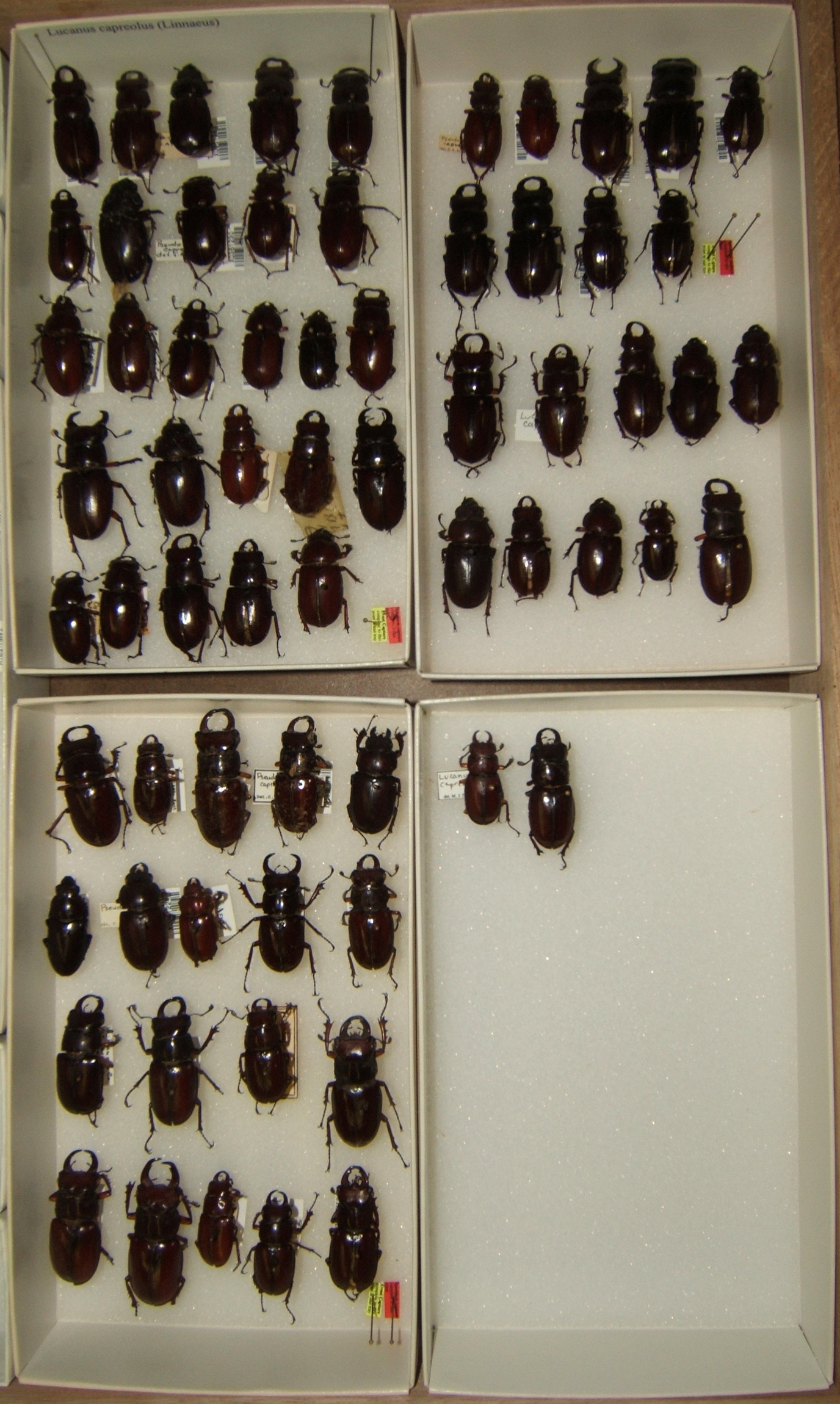
Variation of Lucanus capreolus

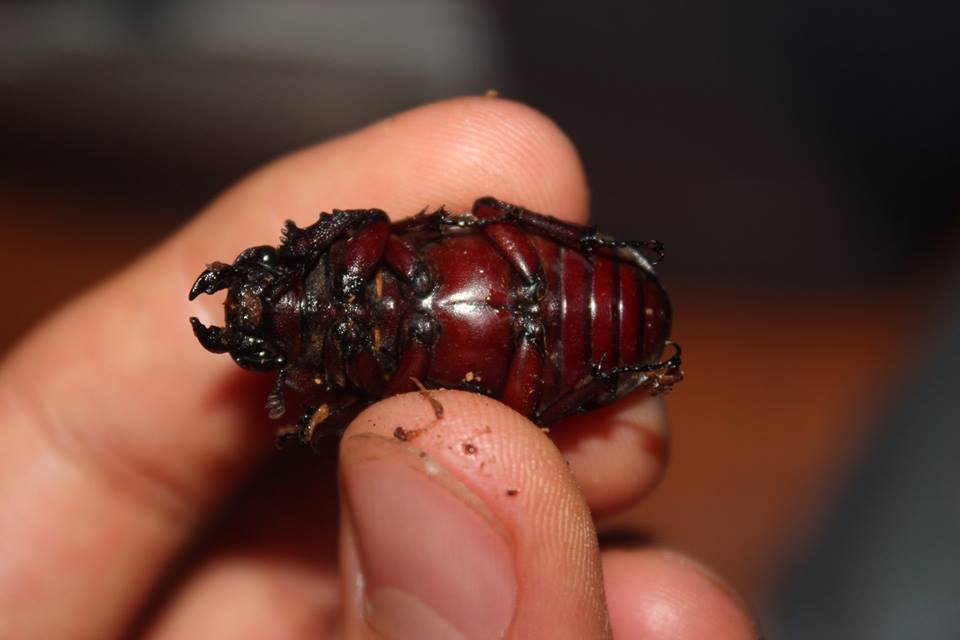
Underside of an adult female

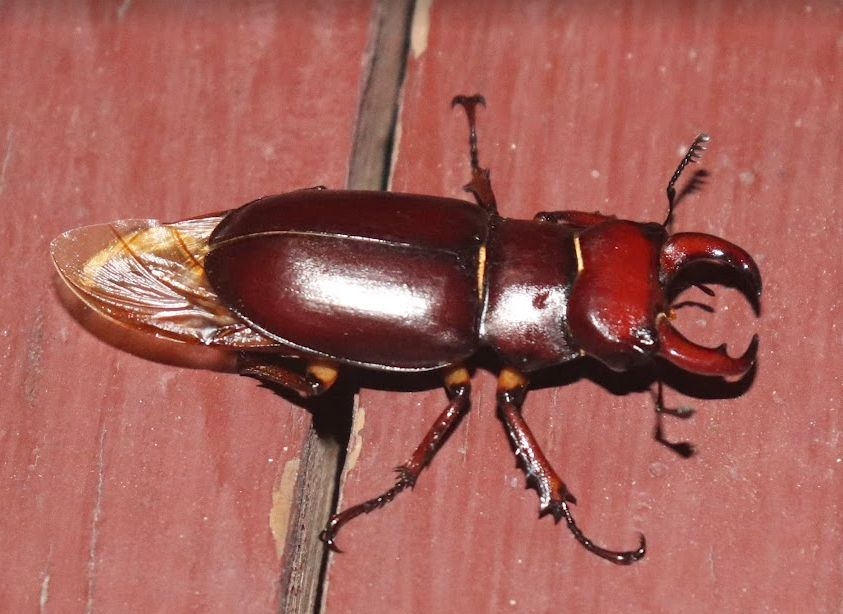
Male Lucanus capreolus stag beetle

== See also ==
- Lucanus cervus
- Taxonomy of Lucanidae
