= Elaphus =

Elaphus occurs in these biological names:

- Cervus elaphus (red deer)
- Lucanus elaphus (giant stag beetle)

== See also ==
- Elephas, a genus of elephants
