= Mazama =

Mazama may refer to:

- Mazama, Washington (pop. 230), a small village located in the Methow Valley in the eastern part of Washington
- Mazama, the genus name of the Brocket deer
- Mount Mazama, a destroyed stratovolcano in Oregon whose caldera contains Crater Lake
- The Mazamas, a mountaineering club based in Portland, Oregon
- Mazama High School, located near Klamath Falls, Oregon, named for Mount Mazama
- Lucanus mazama, a stag beetle of the family Lucanidae
- USS Mazama (AE-9), a US Navy ammunition ship serving in World War II
