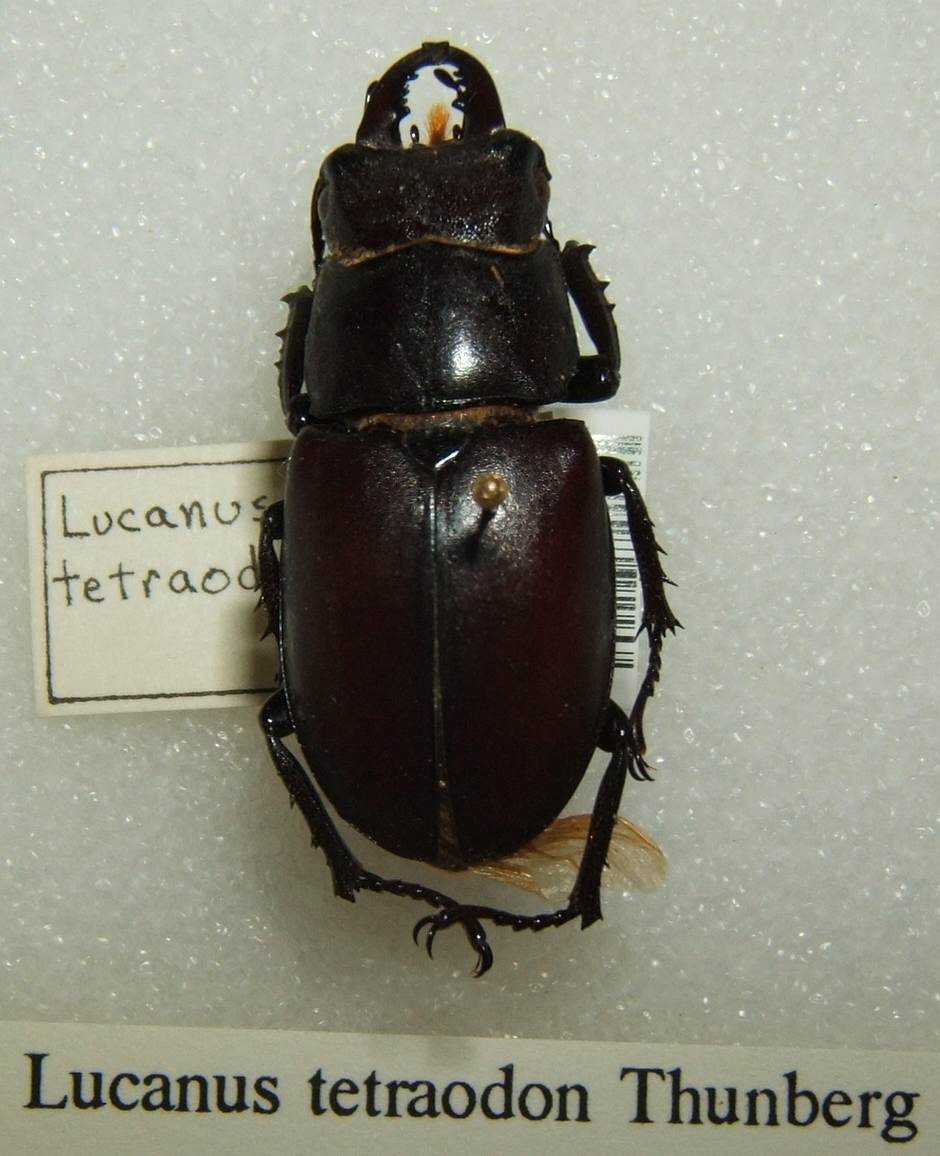
- Lucanus tetraodon, adult

Conservation status
- Least Concern (IUCN 3.1)

Scientific classification
- Kingdom: Animalia
- Phylum: Arthropoda
- Class: Insecta
- Order: Coleoptera
- Suborder: Polyphaga
- Infraorder: Scarabaeiformia
- Family: Lucanidae
- Genus: Lucanus
- Species: L. tetraodon

Binomial name
- Lucanus tetraodon Thunberg, 1806

= Lucanus tetraodon =

Species of beetle

Lucanus tetraodon is a stag beetle of the family Lucanidae.

== Description ==
Similar to Lucanus cervus and Lucanus capreolus it is, with a length of 30–48 mm, a relatively large lucanid beetle of the genus Lucanus. The male has long, curved upper jaws, while female's are shorter.

== Habitat ==
This species is diffused in Central and Southern Italy, Sicily, Sardinia, Corsica, Southern France, Albania, Greece and Algeria. It is diffused in the mesophilic woods and in the maquis shrubland.

== Gallery ==
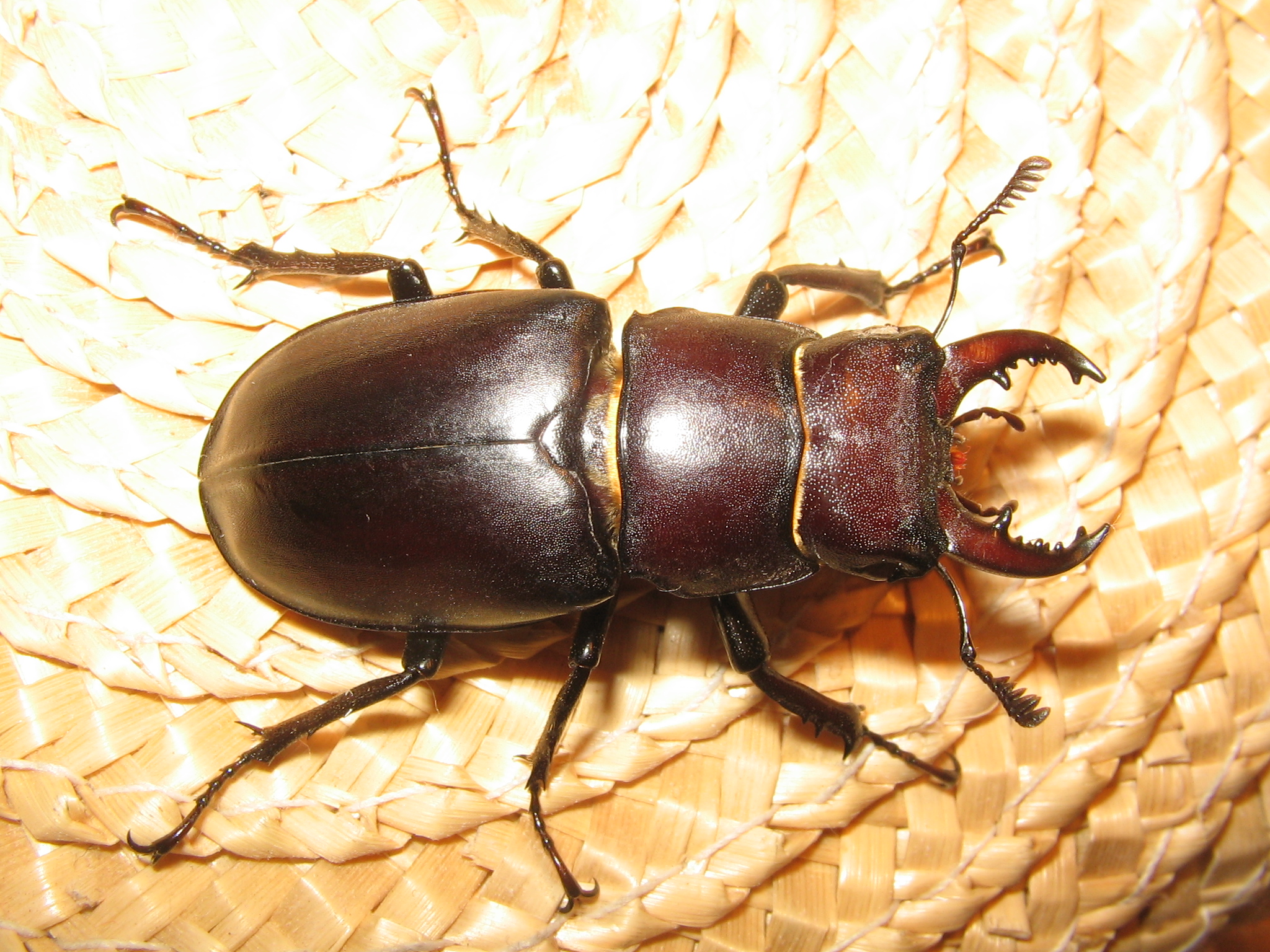
A male exemplar

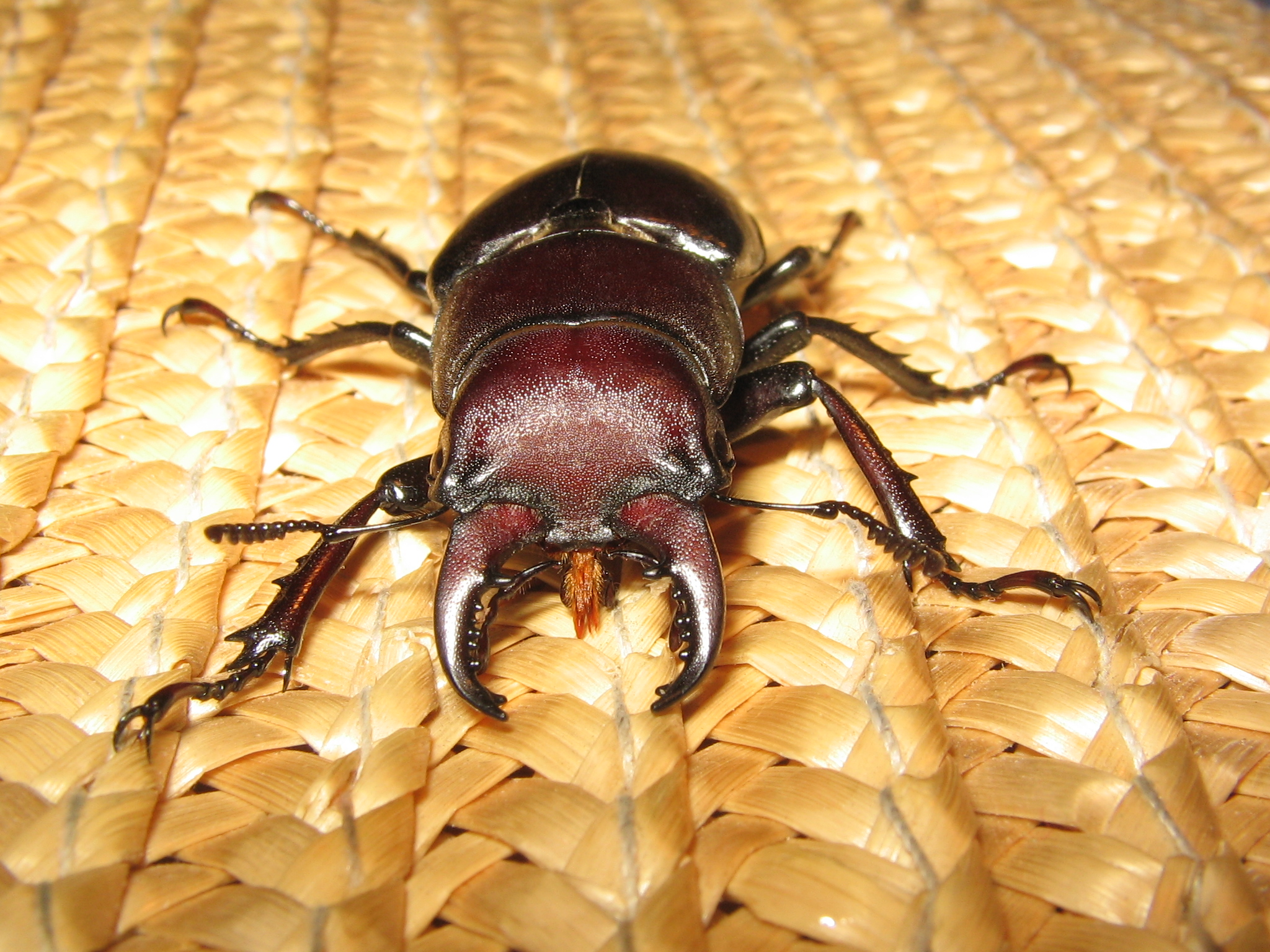
Front view of a male

== See also ==
- Taxonomy of Lucanidae
