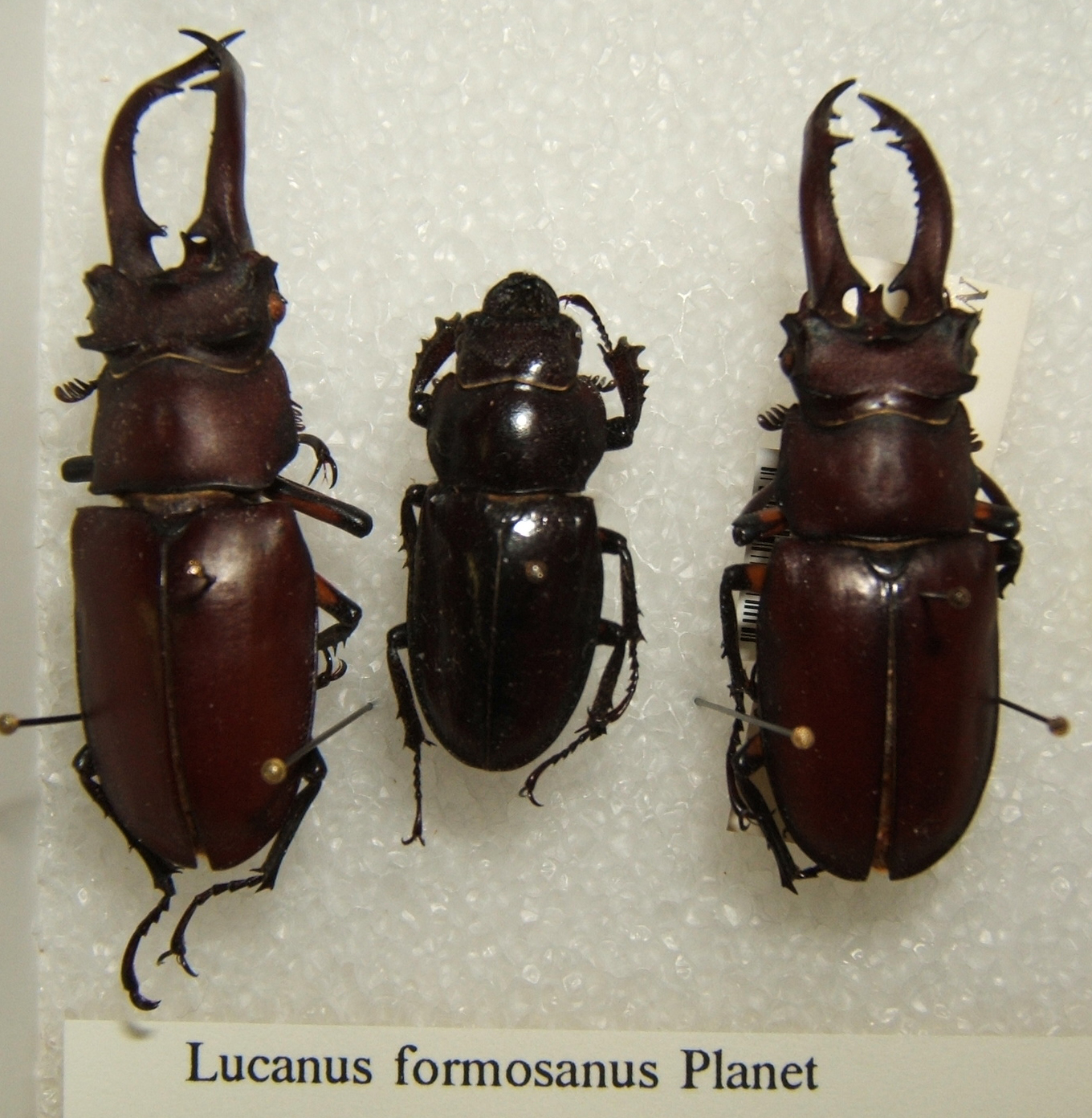

Scientific classification
- Kingdom: Animalia
- Phylum: Arthropoda
- Class: Insecta
- Order: Coleoptera
- Suborder: Polyphaga
- Infraorder: Scarabaeiformia
- Family: Lucanidae
- Genus: Lucanus
- Species: L. formosanus

Binomial name
- Lucanus formosanus Planet, 1899

= Lucanus formosanus =

Species of beetle

Lucanus formosanus is a stag beetle which is endemic to Taiwan, and grows to a length of 45–80 millimetres (1.8–3.1 in). Like other species in the Lucanid family, L. formosanus exhibits distinct sexual dimorphism and subsequent external morphological allometry in males. Males of the species develop mandibles of various forms depending on geographic location; i.e. northern, central, and southern morphs.
