= Lucanus datunensis =

Scientific classification
- Kingdom: Animalia
- Phylum: Arthropoda
- Clade: Pancrustacea
- Class: Insecta
- Order: Coleoptera
- Suborder: Polyphaga
- Infraorder: Scarabaeiformia
- Family: Lucanidae
- Genus: Lucanus
- Species: L. datunensis

Binomial name
- Lucanus datunensis Hashimoto, 1984

Species of beetle

Lucanus datunensis is a species of stag beetle endemic to Tatun Mountain of Taiwan's Yangmingshan. It is first described in 1984. It is the smallest stag beetle in Taiwan and is an endangered species threatened by recent human activity.

== Etymology ==
The Chinese name of L. datunensis (大屯姬深山鍬形蟲) is named after its natural habitat and its small body size. Where 大屯 indicates Tatun Mountain and 姬 indicates princess which in Chinese symbolises small and delicate. The scientific name of the species was formed in a similar pattern where datunensis is named after the Tatun Mountain. The species has no common name in English since it is absent in English speaking regions.

== Taxonomy ==
Lucanus datunensis is not closely related to any of the other nine endemic Lucanus species in Taiwan. Instead, it is more closely related to Lucanus fortunei which is located in only found in mainland China. This is believed to be due to the natural isolation caused by the environment.

== Description ==
Like most beetles in the genus Lucanus, the L. datunensis species are sexually dimorphic. The male L. datunensis have a larger body size when compared to females, and have enlarged mandibles. Their body size is the smallest among all other stag beetles in Taiwan, the males have a body size (including the mandibles) ranging from 25–38 mm long, whereas the females only have a body size of 23–27 mm long. Both male and female L. datunensis have a russet elytra which provides them camouflage to hide within the dirt, and hook-like claws at the end of their feet, which allow them to grab on to tree barks. Morphologically speaking Lucanus datunensis appeared to be a lot similar to Lucanus miwai, which is a distantly related species. These adaptation were believed to be caused by environmental isolation and shifting of environment.

== Lifecycle ==
Adult Lucanus datunensiss only appear during late May and late June, which is also their mating seasons. Like most of the Lucanus species, the female would lay her egg under the soil or within a piece of rotten wood. However, due to their natural habitat, it is more common for the females to lay their egg under the soils due to the absence of trees in the region. The larval stage would last for 3–4 years to fully grown, and the adult stage would only last for 2 months. During the larval stage, Lucanus datunensis would be consuming rotten grass and soil as their major food source.

== Behaviour and ecology ==
=== Habitat ===
Among all other stag beetles in Taiwan, L. datunensis exhibits a completely different ecology, L. datunensis can only be found in the hilltop region of Tatun Mountain. The region is at an elevation level of 800–1100 meters, which is relatively low when compared to other stag beetles species in Taiwan. Two kinds of grass dominate the vegetations of this region, the dwarf bamboo and Japanese silver grass, and unlike an ordinary stag beetle habitat, there is an absence of trees in the hilltop region, although the surrounding areas of the Tatun Mountain are dominated by Machilus–Castanopsis forest. For other stag beetles, the hilltop region would not be an ideal habitat as they mainly feed on resins and fruit, live on tree branches, and lay their egg in rotten wood pieces. But the L. datunensis were evolved and adapted to the hilltop region. L. datunensis is a significant species for the scientist due to this unique adaptation to the environment.

=== Daily activity, use of space and detectability ===
In the hilltop region, female L. datunensis are hard to track as most of the females tend to hide under rocks or soils even during mating seasons. The males are significantly more frequent in flights and are most commonly found hovering on the Japanese silver grasses. Unlike most stag beetles, L. datunensis are daylight beetles, they are most active during the morning from 5 am – 11 am. The male L. datunensis can be found flying and hovering above the Japanese silver grass, looking for mates and food. most of the males tend to go hiding after the morning had passed, and became hard to find. These beetle remain passive in the night and are never attracted to lights in the nights. Due to their behaviour pattern, it is hard to estimate their total population. Therefore the total population of the L. datunensis remained unknown.

=== Natural predators ===
Lucanus datunensis, being the smallest stag beetle in Taiwan and having a behaviour of constantly flying on top of the grass field during the day, has a lot of predators that would feed on them. Its main predators in Taiwan are mostly birds and lizards such as Plestiodon elegans and light-vented bulbul (Pycnonotus sinensis).

== Relationship with humans ==
=== Human as a major threat ===
Since the hilltop region of Tatun Mountain is close to various tourist attractions and farmlands, human activity became the major of the Lucanus datunensis. The natural habitat of L. datunensis had drastically decreased as lands were used in the construction of roads and agriculture industry of planting teas. The pesticides used by the agriculture industry are also threatening the L. datunensis as the beetles often got closed to the farmlands due to lack of habitat. The beetles are also threatened due to over capturing for commercial uses, as the L. datunensis is now identified as an endangered species, it became rare and valuable for the insect collector, which would illegally capture the beetles. One of the major concern of L. datunensis is the inbreeding of the species, as their population and habitat continued to decline, inbreeding became rather common for the beetles. The genetic similarity L. datunensis would lead to vulnerability to diseases, which further lead to mass extinction.

=== Protection ===
Due to the rarity and uniqueness of L. datunensis, every year insect enthusiasts and normal tourist would go to Tatun Mountain just to see them, bringing massive amount of profit to the local tourist economy. The Taiwan government had identified these species as an endangered species and had started multiple research on the conservation of this species. Multiple laws and legislation were raised, the Yangmingshan National Park had raised multiple educational activities to raise awareness for the beetles. However in order to keep the economic value these beetles brought to the region, the government had yet to set a complete restriction to the area in order to protect the beetles from illegal trafficking.
