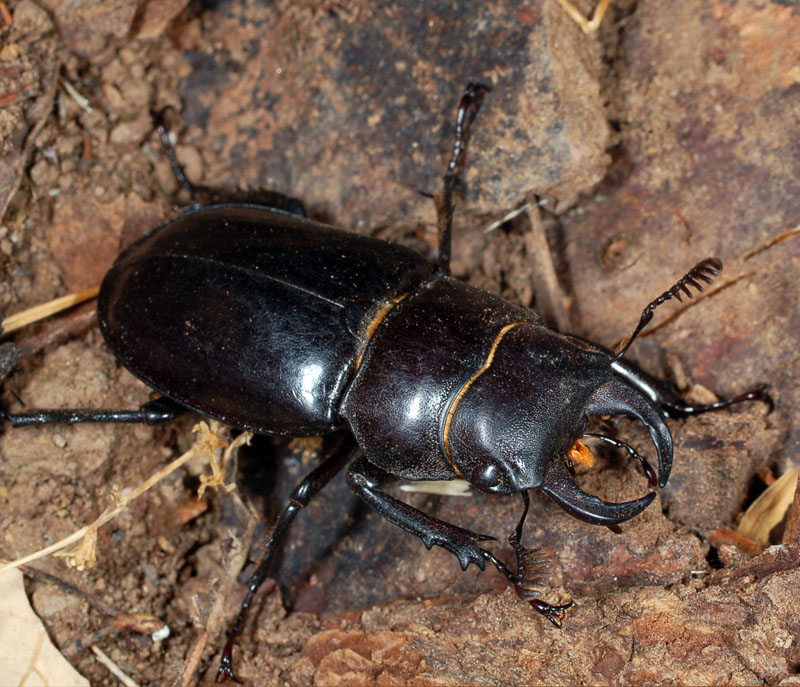
- Male
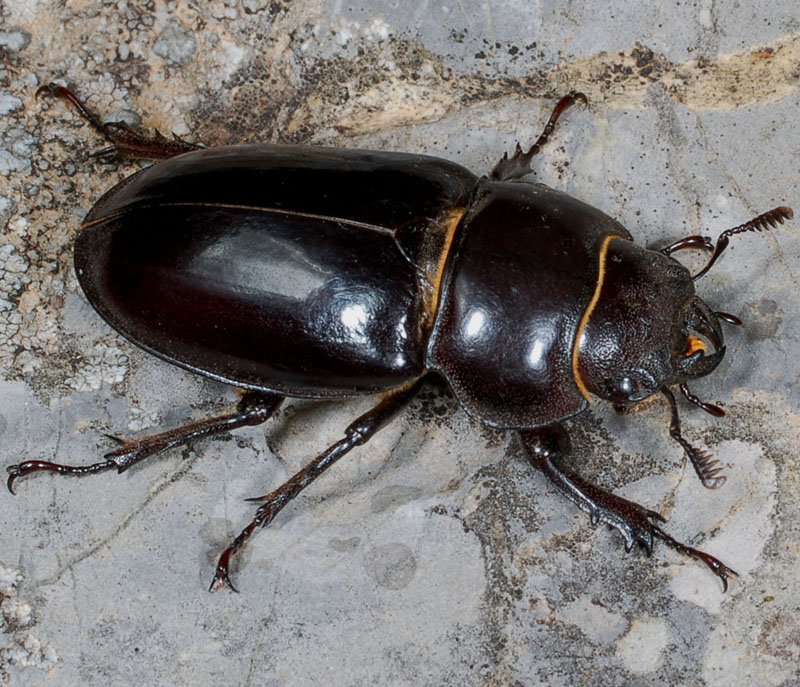
- Female

Conservation status
- Least Concern (IUCN 3.1)

- Least Concern (IUCN 3.1) (Mediterranean)

Scientific classification
- Kingdom: Animalia
- Phylum: Arthropoda
- Class: Insecta
- Order: Coleoptera
- Suborder: Polyphaga
- Infraorder: Scarabaeiformia
- Family: Lucanidae
- Genus: Lucanus
- Species: L. barbarossa

Binomial name
- Lucanus barbarossa Fabricius, 1801

Synonyms
- Platycerus barbarossa minor Seabra, 1905; Pseudolucanus barbarossa (Fabricius, 1801)

= Lucanus barbarossa =

Species of beetle

Lucanus barbarossa is a species of stag beetle native to southwestern Europe and Northwest Africa.
