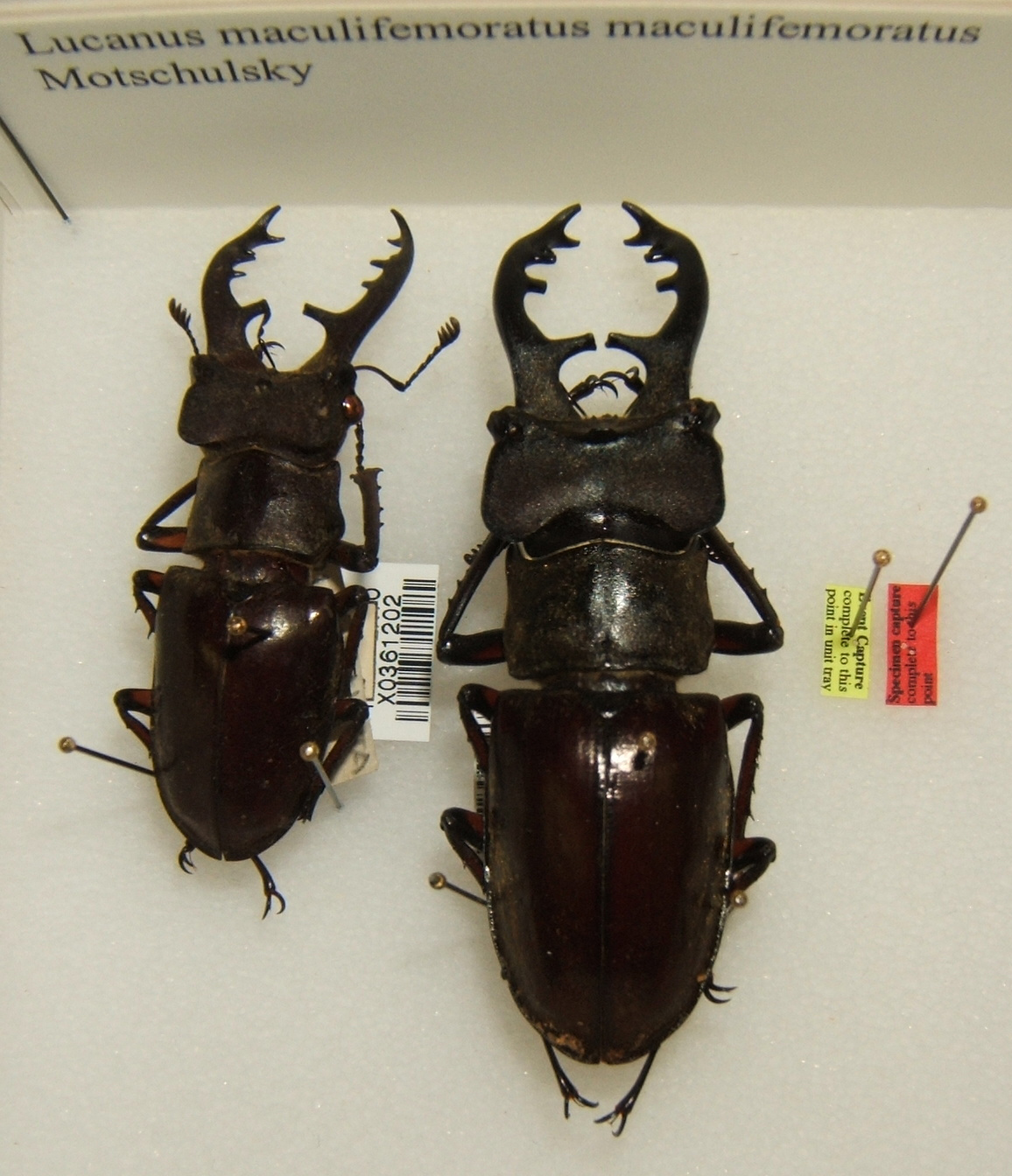
- Lucanus maculifemoratus maculifemoratus, adult

Scientific classification
- Kingdom: Animalia
- Phylum: Arthropoda
- Class: Insecta
- Order: Coleoptera
- Suborder: Polyphaga
- Infraorder: Scarabaeiformia
- Family: Lucanidae
- Genus: Lucanus
- Species: L. maculifemoratus

Binomial name
- Lucanus maculifemoratus Motschulsky, 1861

= Lucanus maculifemoratus =

Species of beetle

Lucanus maculifemoratus is a beetle of the family Lucanidae. This species is known as Miyama stag beetle, or deep mountain stag beetle, in Japan. These beetles have a light covering of golden hair on their back, mostly around the rear edges.

Lucanus maculifemoratus is known from northeastern Asia, including Japan, Korea, China and Russia, Taiwan.

== Subspecies ==
- Lucanus maculifemoratus
  - Lucanus maculifemoratus adachii
  - Lucanus maculifemoratus boileaui
  - Lucanus maculifemoratus ferriei
  - Lucanus maculifemoratus jilinensis
  - Lucanus maculifemoratus maculifemoratus
  - Lucanus maculifemoratus taiwanus

L.dybowski was considered a sub-species of L.maculifemoratus but is now considered an independent species.

== Gallery ==
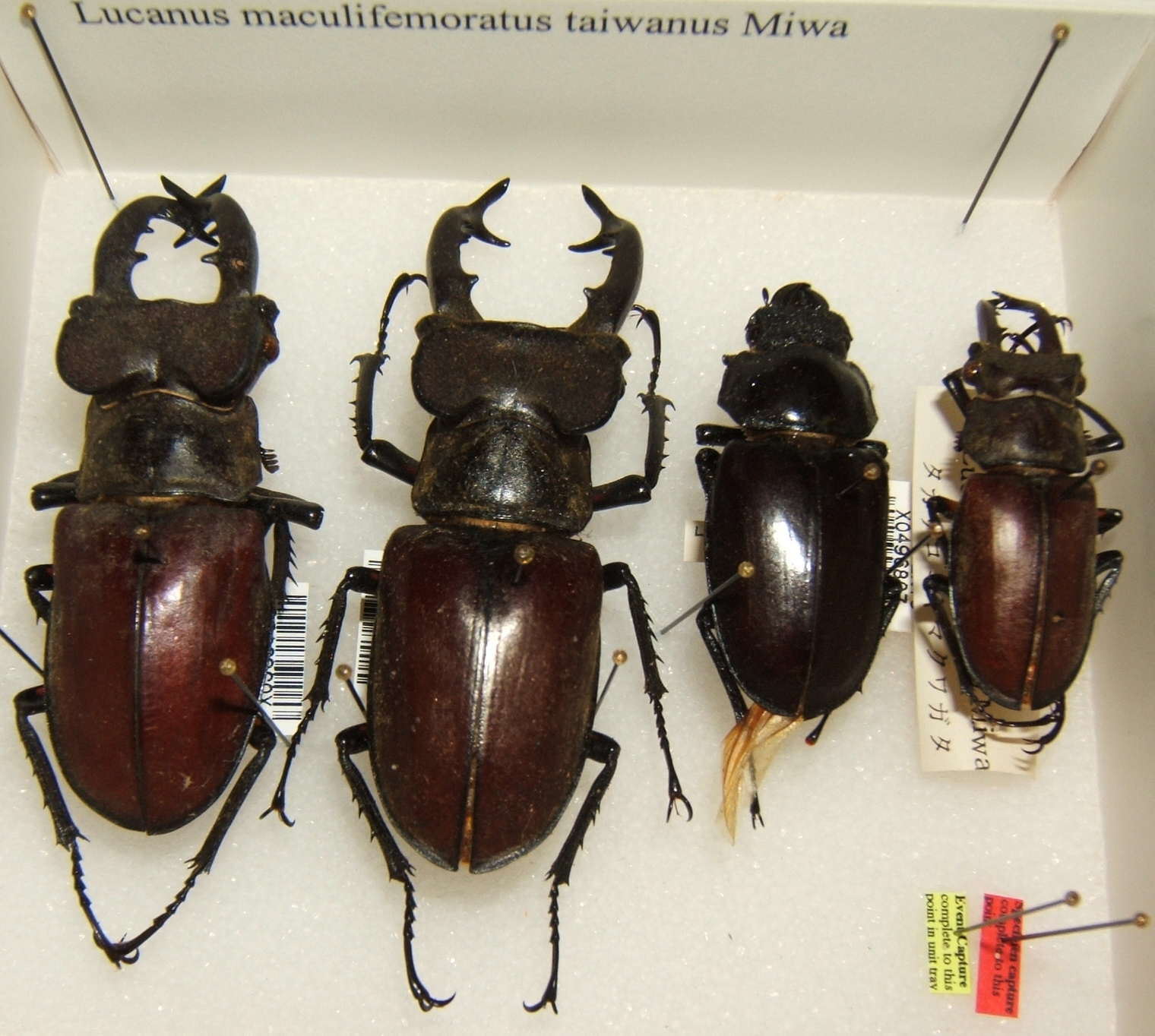
Lucanus maculifemoratus taiwanus

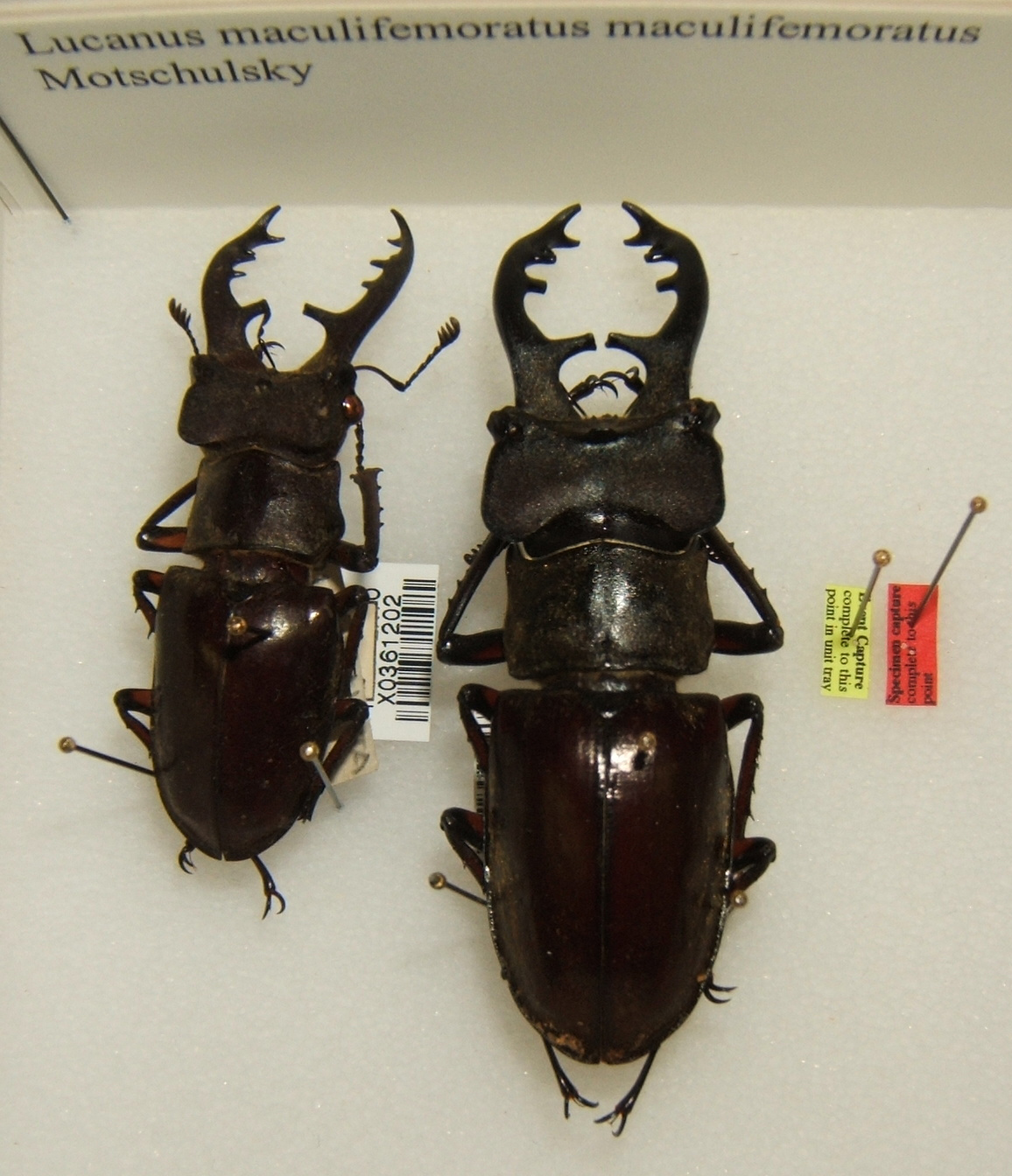
Lucanus maculifemoratus maculifemoratus
