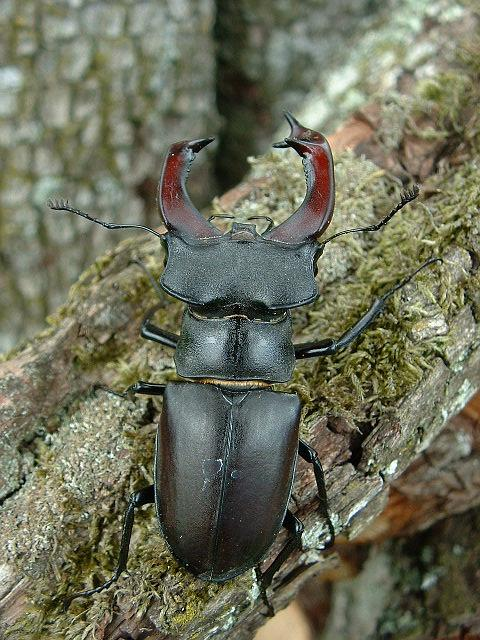
- Male Lucanus cervus

Scientific classification
- Domain: Eukaryota
- Kingdom: Animalia
- Phylum: Arthropoda
- Class: Insecta
- Order: Coleoptera
- Suborder: Polyphaga
- Infraorder: Scarabaeiformia
- Family: Lucanidae
- Subfamily: Lucaninae
- Genus: Lucanus; Scopoli, 1763

Species
- See text

= Lucanus (beetle) =

Genus of beetles

Lucanus is a genus of stag beetles (Lucanidae).

== List of species ==
- Lucanus adelmae Zilioli, 2003
- Lucanus angusticornis Didier, 1925
- Lucanus atratus Hope, 1831
- Lucanus aunsani Zilioli, 2000
- Lucanus barbarossa Fabricius, 1801
- Lucanus brivoi Zilioli, 2003
- Lucanus cantori Hope, 1842
- Lucanus capreolus (Linnaeus, 1763) - pinching bug
- Lucanus cervus (Linnaeus, 1758) - European stag beetle
- Lucanus confusus (Boucher, 1994)
- Lucanus cyclommatoides Didier, 1928
- Lucanus datunensis Hashimoto, 1984
- Lucanus delavayi Fairmaire, 1887
- Lucanus dohertyi Boileau, 1911
- Lucanus elaphus (Fabricius, 1775) - giant stag beetle
- Lucanus fairmairei Planet, 1897
- Lucanus ferriei Planet, 1898
- Lucanus formosanus Planet, 1899
- Lucanus fortunei Saunders, 1854
- Lucanus fryi Boileau, 1911
- Lucanus fukinukiae Katsura, 2002
- Lucanus gamunus Sawada & Watanabe, 1960
- Lucanus hayashii Nagai, 2000
- Lucanus hermani DeLisle, 1973
- Lucanus hildegardae Zilioli, 2002
- Lucanus ibericus Motschulsky, 1845
- Lucanus kanoi Y. Kurosawa, 1966
- Lucanus kirchneri Zilioli, 1999
- Lucanus koyamai Akiyama & H. Hirasawa, 1990
- Lucanus kraatzi Nagel, 1926
- Lucanus kurosawai Sakaino, 1995
- Lucanus laetus Arrow, 1943
- Lucanus laminifer Waterhouse, 1890
- Lucanus ludivinae Boucher, 1998
- Lucanus lunifer Hope, 1833
- Lucanus maculifemoratus Motschulsky, 1861
- Lucanus mazama (LeConte, 1861)
- Lucanus maedai
- Lucanus mearesii Hope, 1842
- Lucanus miwai Y. Kurosawa, 1966
- Lucanus nangsarae Nagai, 2000
- Lucanus nobilis Didier, 1925
- Lucanus nosei Nagai, 2000
- Lucanus ogakii Imanishi, 1990
- Lucanus parryi Boileau, 1899
- Lucanus pesarinii Zilioli, 1998
- Lucanus placidus Say, 1825
- Lucanus planeti Planet, 1899
- Lucanus prossi Zilioli, 2000
- Lucanus pulchellus Didier, 1925
- Lucanus sericeus Didier, 1925
- Lucanus smithi Parry, 1862
- Lucanus swinhoei Parry, 1874
- Lucanus szetschuanicus Hanus, 1932
- Lucanus tetraodon Thunberg, 1806
- Lucanus tibetanus Planet, 1898
- Lucanus tsukamotoi Nagai, 2002
- Lucanus villosus Hope, 1831
- Lucanus westermanii Hope & Westwood, 1845
- Lucanus xerxes (Král, 2005)
- Lucanus ziliolii Fukinuki, 2000

Species currently placed in other genera (Huang 2010):

- Noseolucanus denticulus (Boucher, 1995)
- Noseolucanus zhengi Huang, 2006
- Eolucanus davidis (Deyrolle, 1878)
- Eolucanus gracilis Albers, 1889
- Eolucanus lesnei (Planet, 1905)
- Eolucanus mingyiae Huang, 2010
- Eolucanus oberthueri (Planet, 1896)
- Eolucanus pani Huang, 2010
- Eolucanus prometheus (Boucher & Huang, 1991)

== Gallery ==
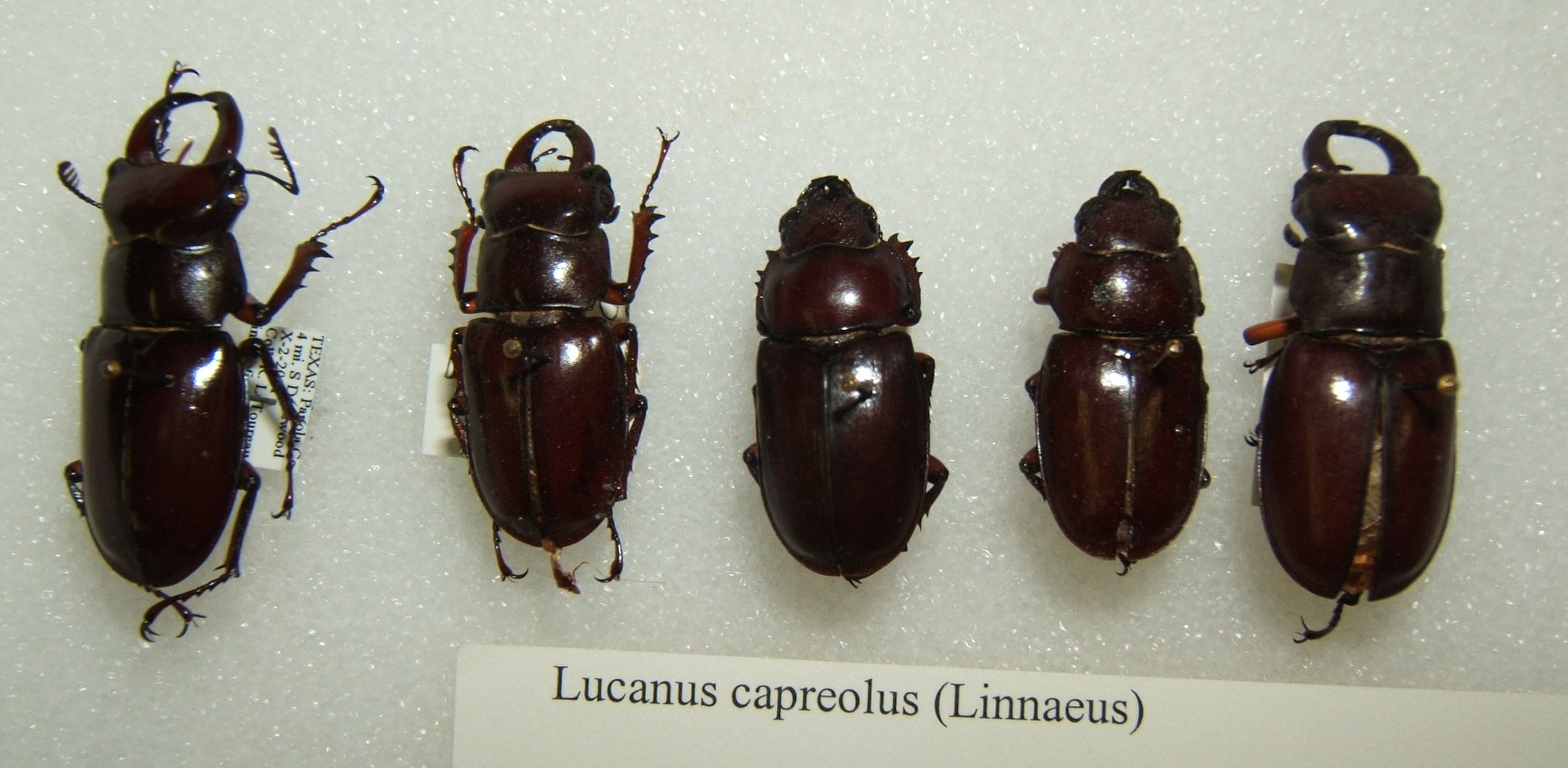
Lucanus capreolus

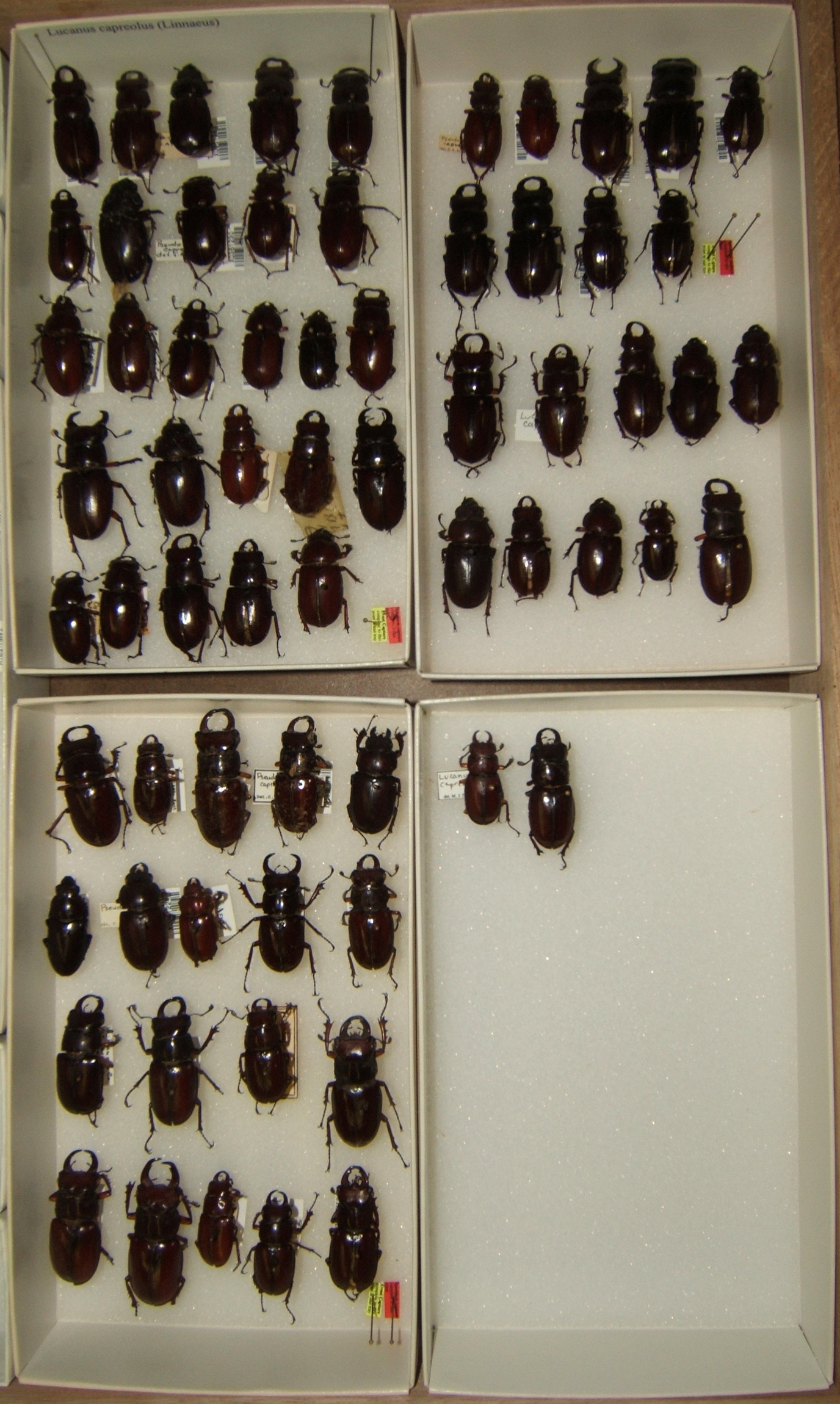
Lucanus capreolus variation

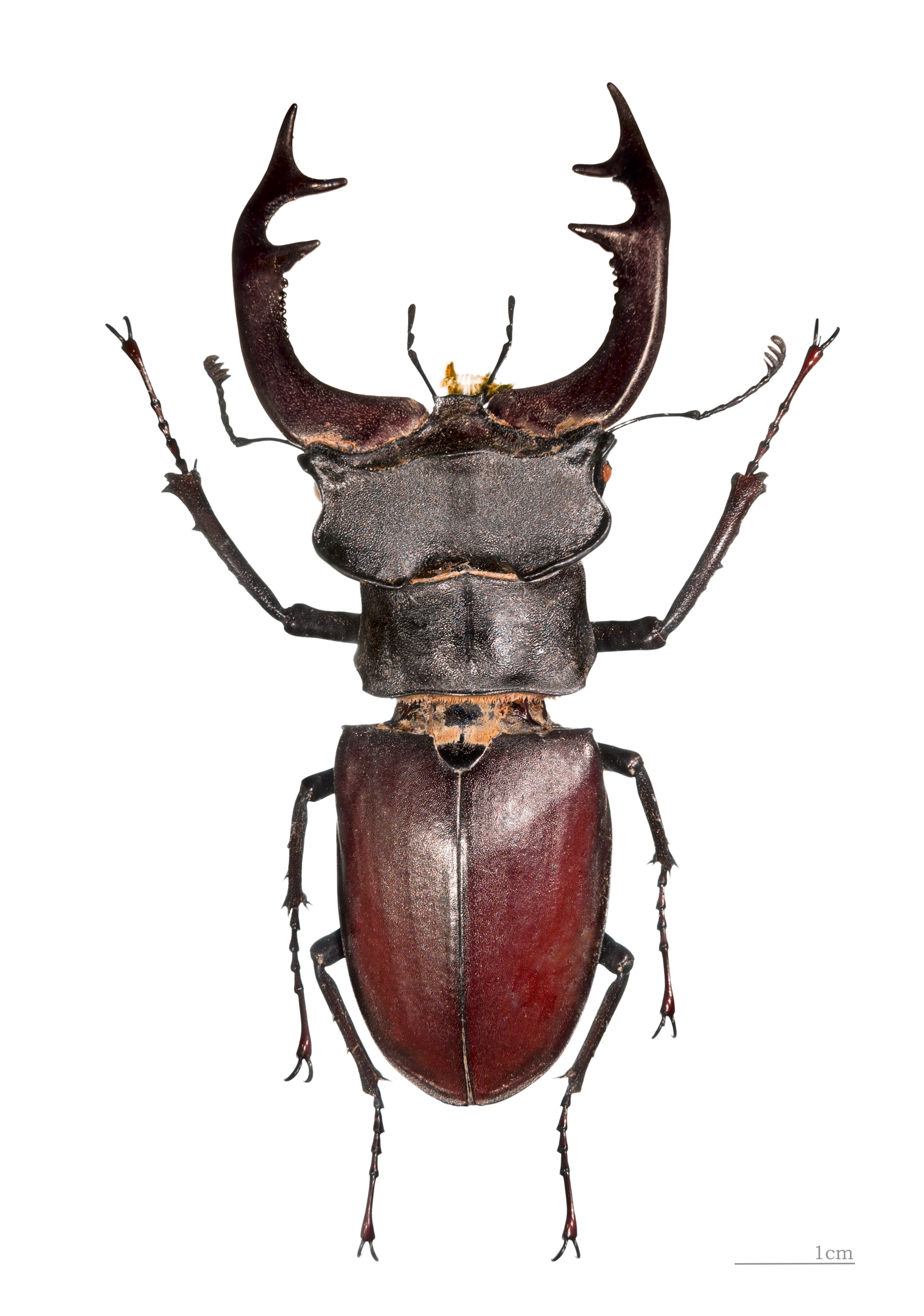
Lucanus cervus

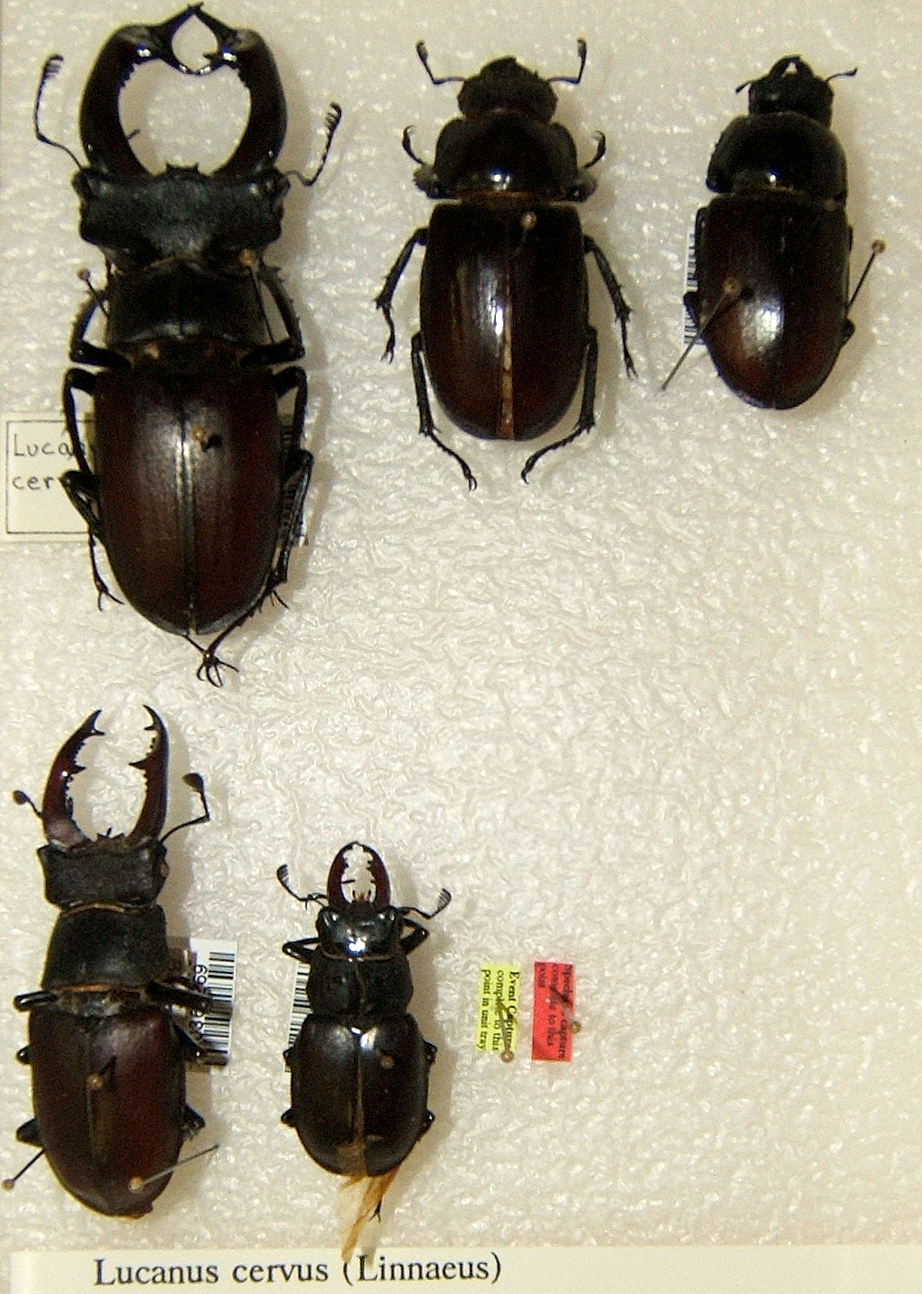
Lucanus cervus variation

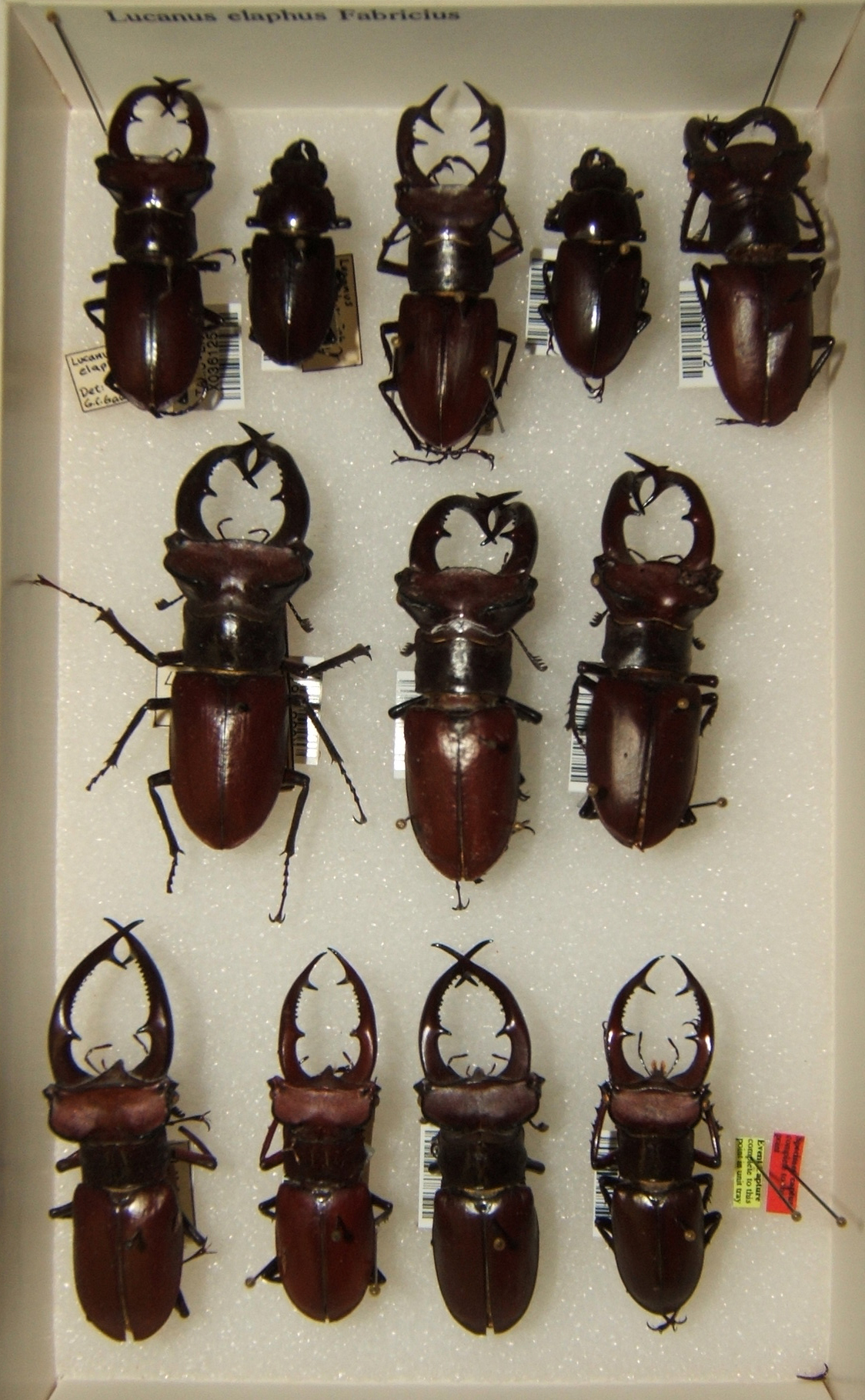
Lucanus elaphus variation

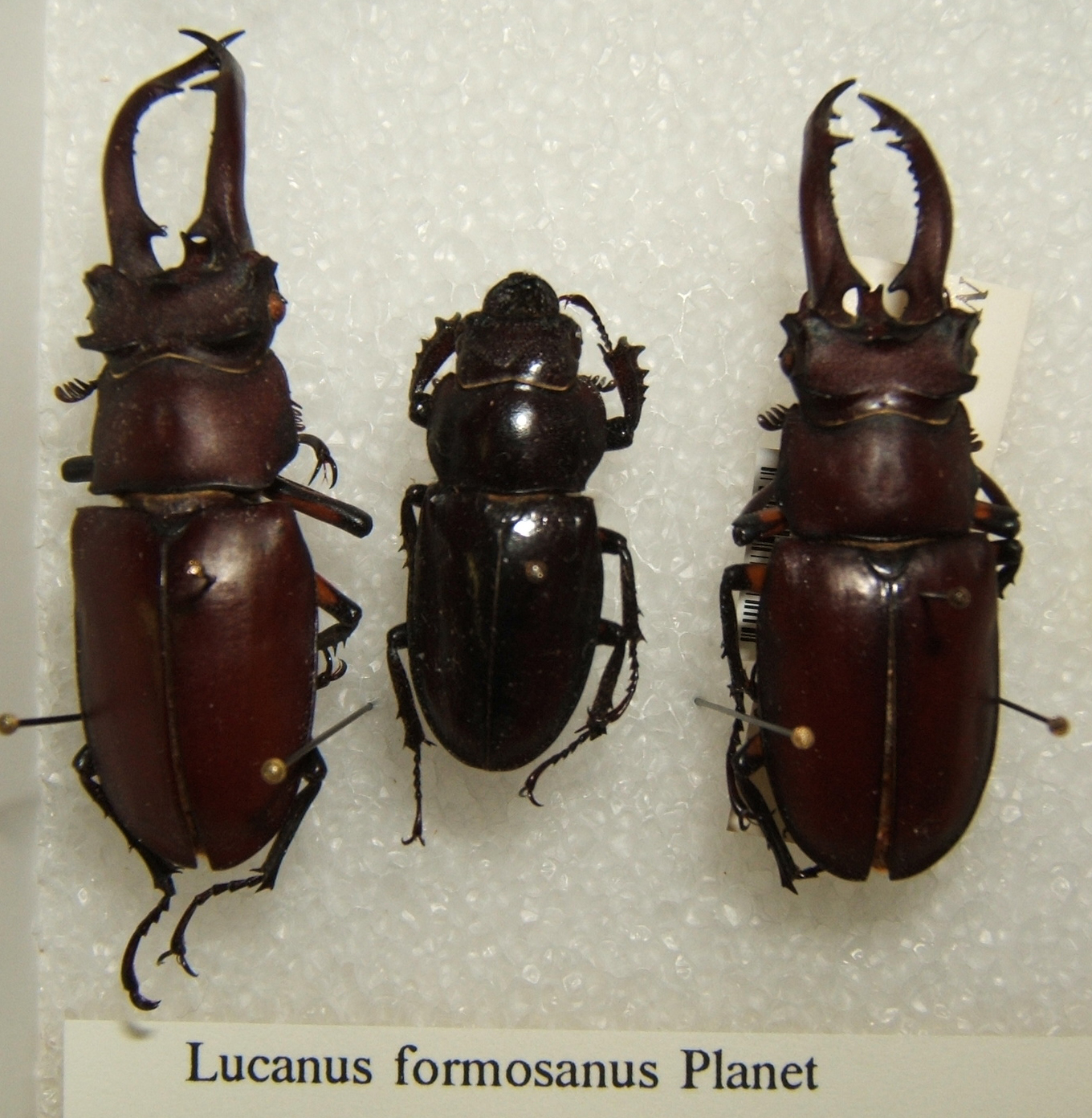
Lucanus formosanus

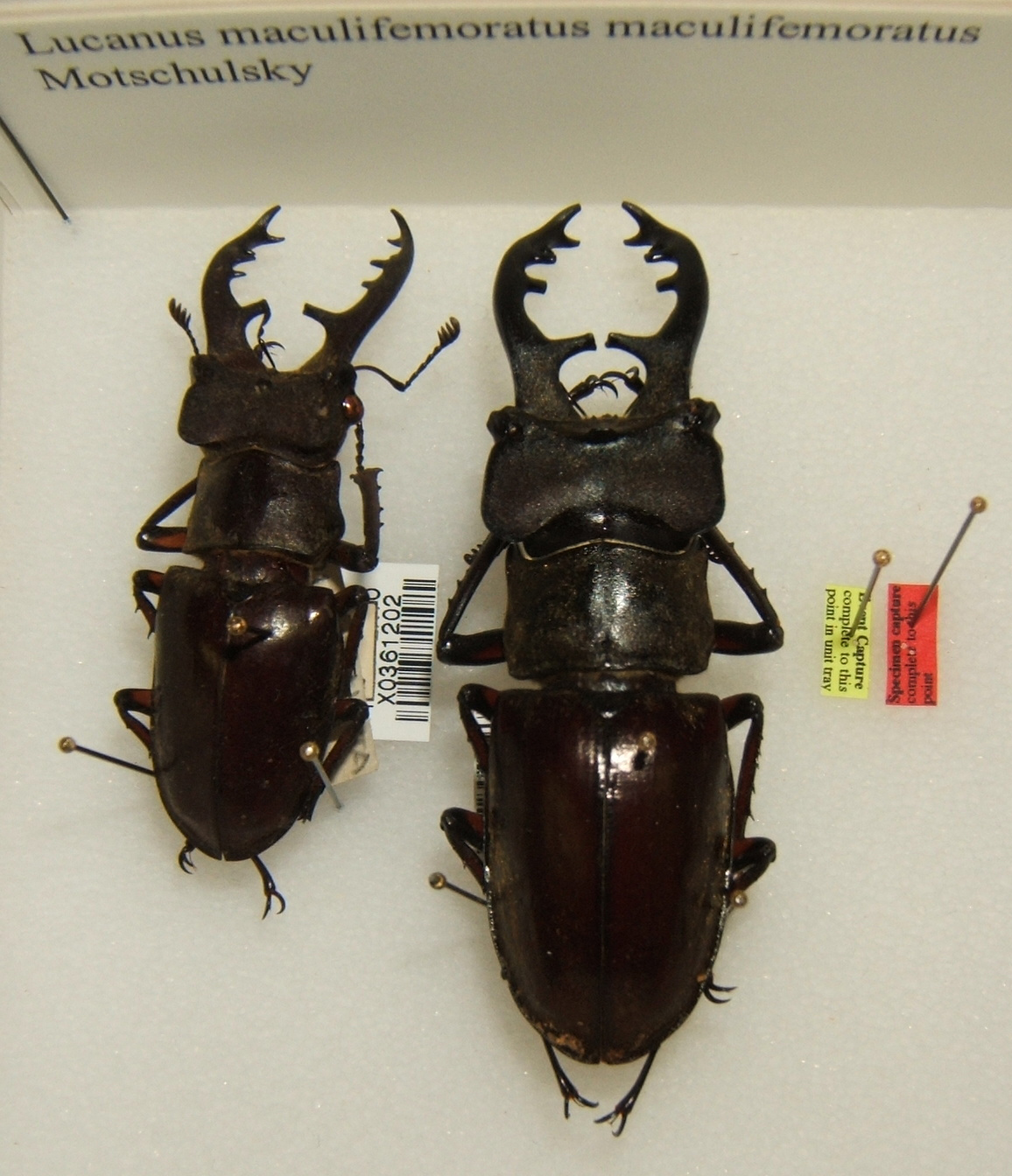
Lucanus maculifemoratus maculifemoratus

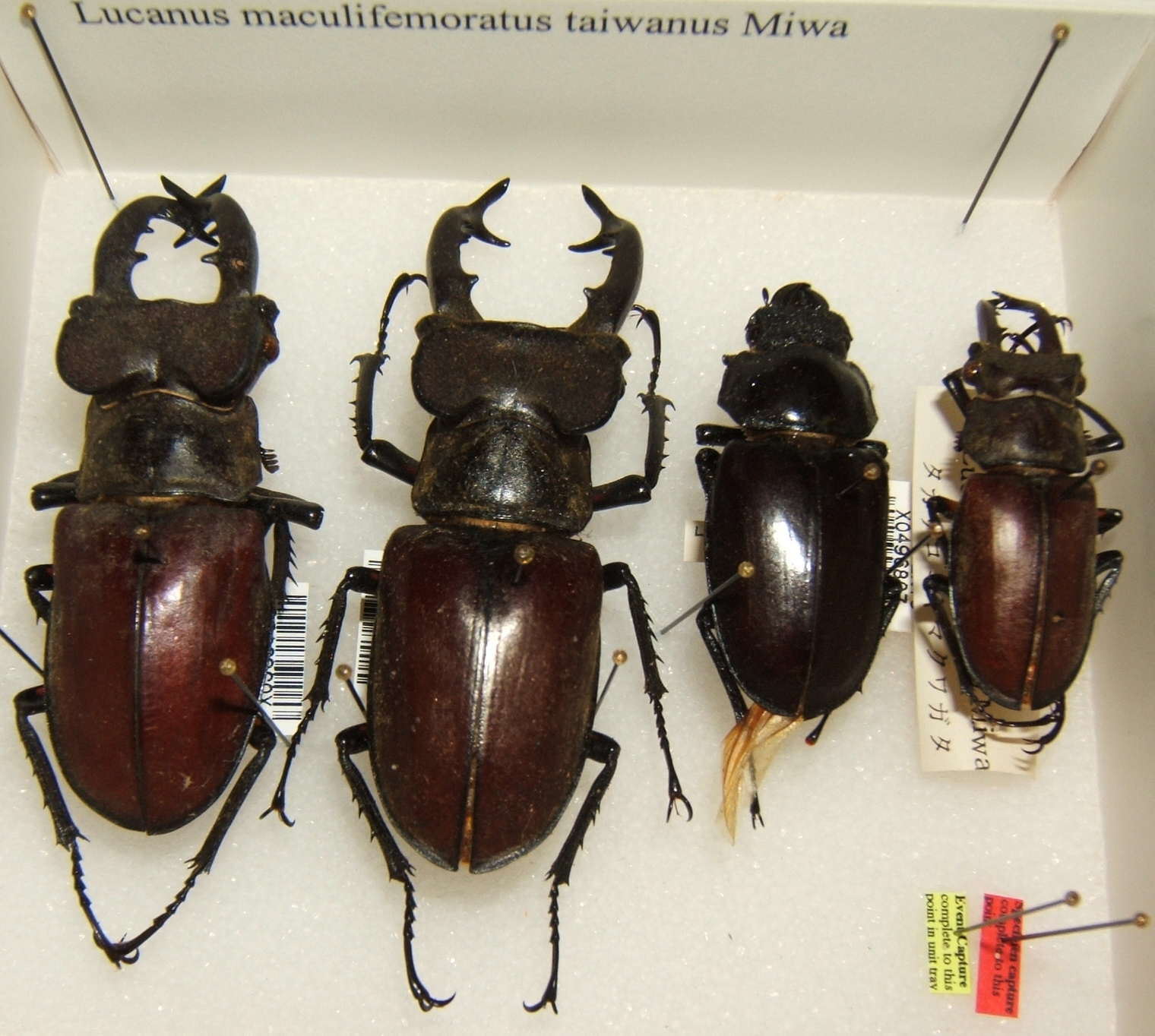
Lucanus maculifemoratus taiwanus

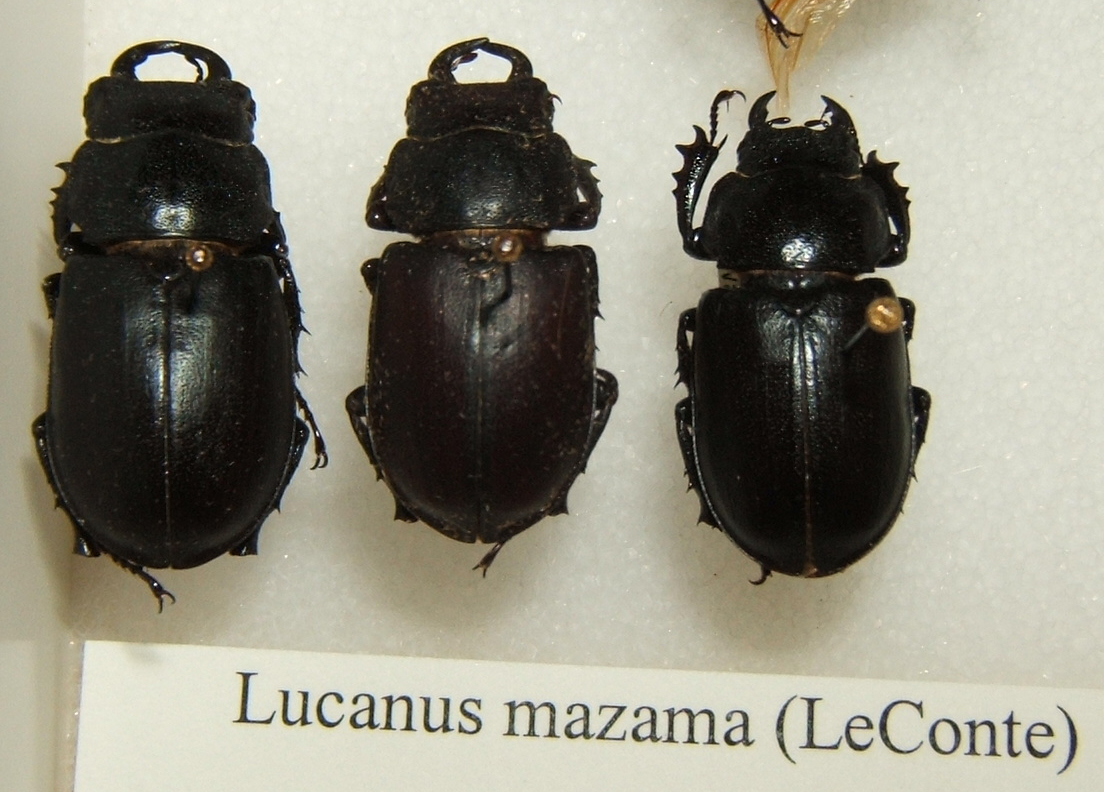
Lucanus mazama

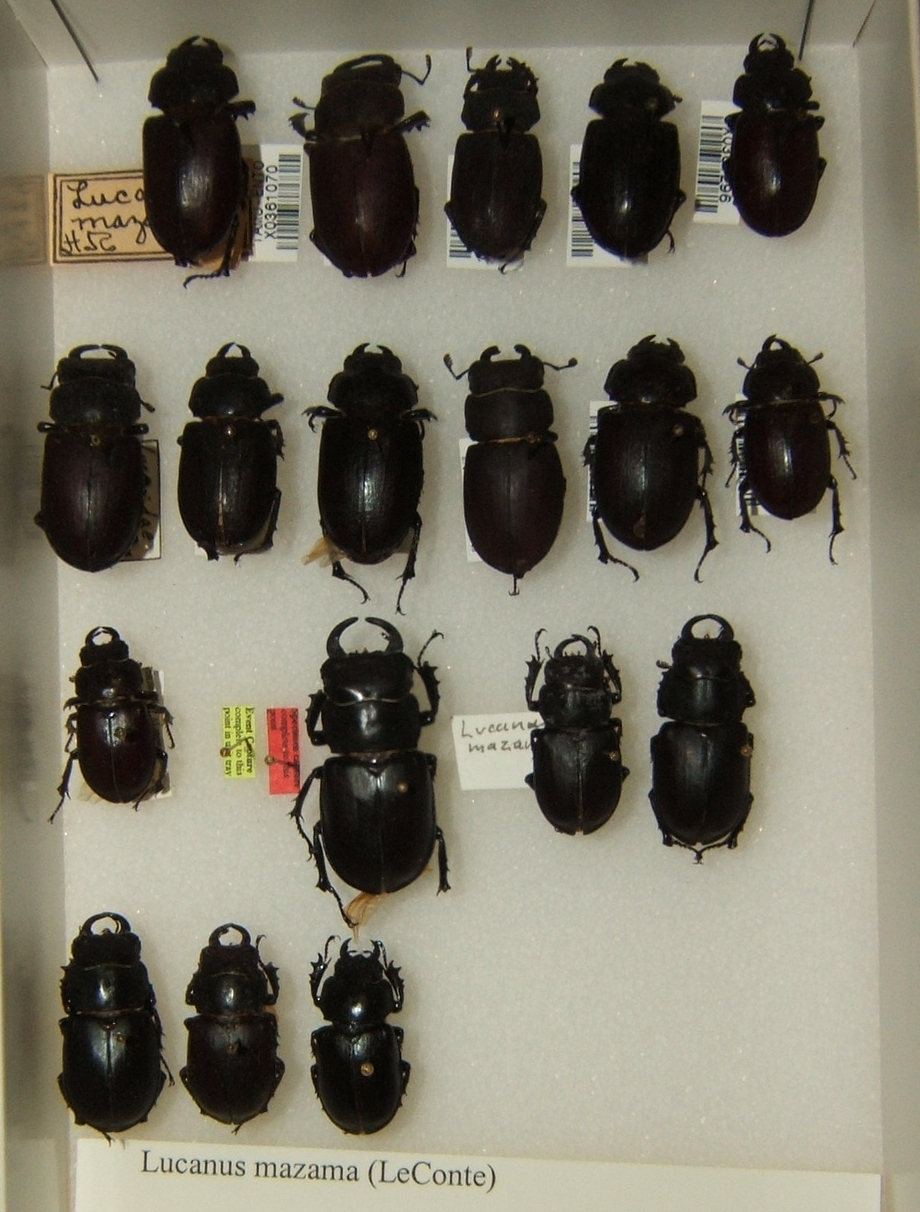
Lucanus mazama variation

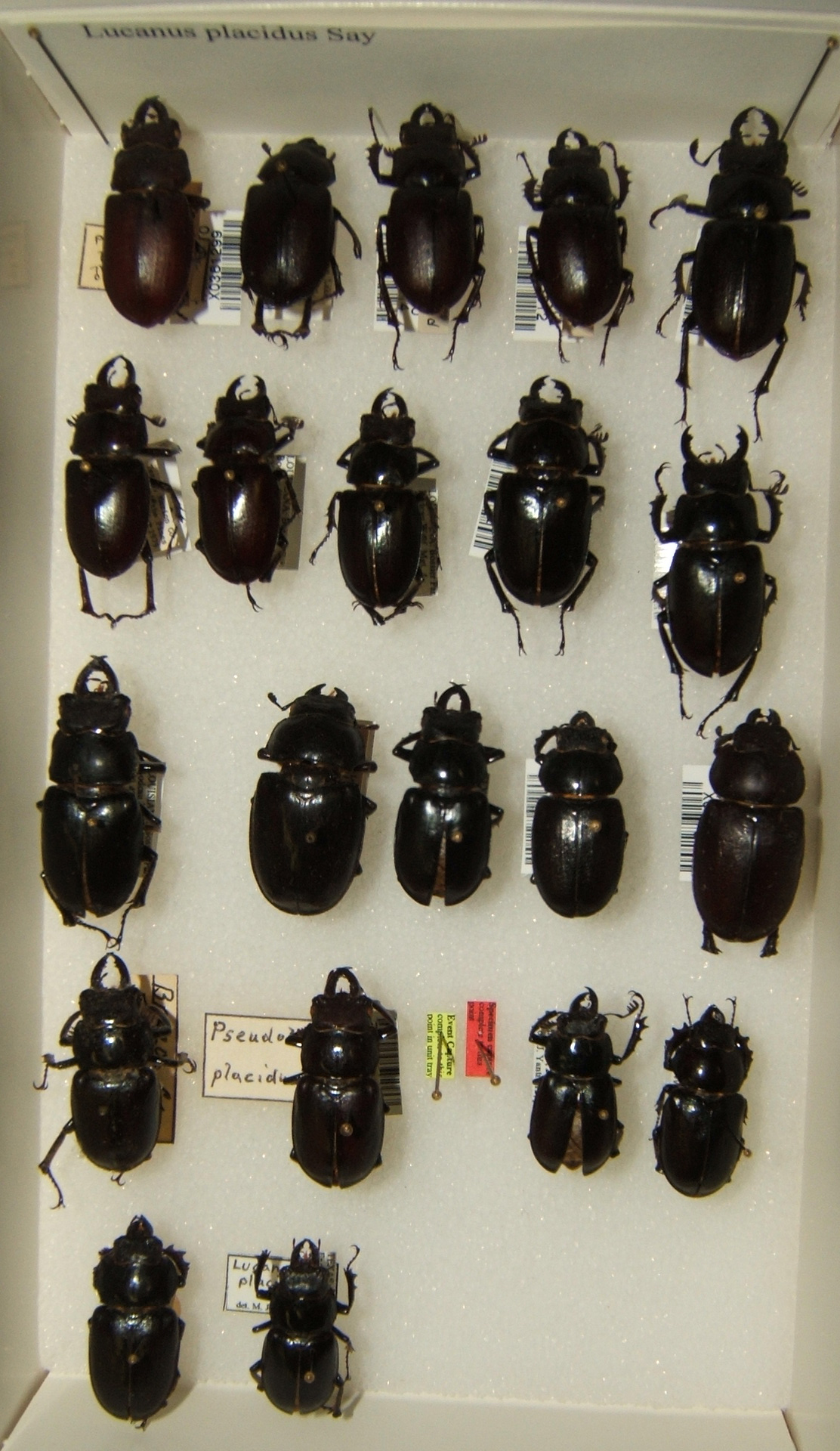
Lucanus placidus variation

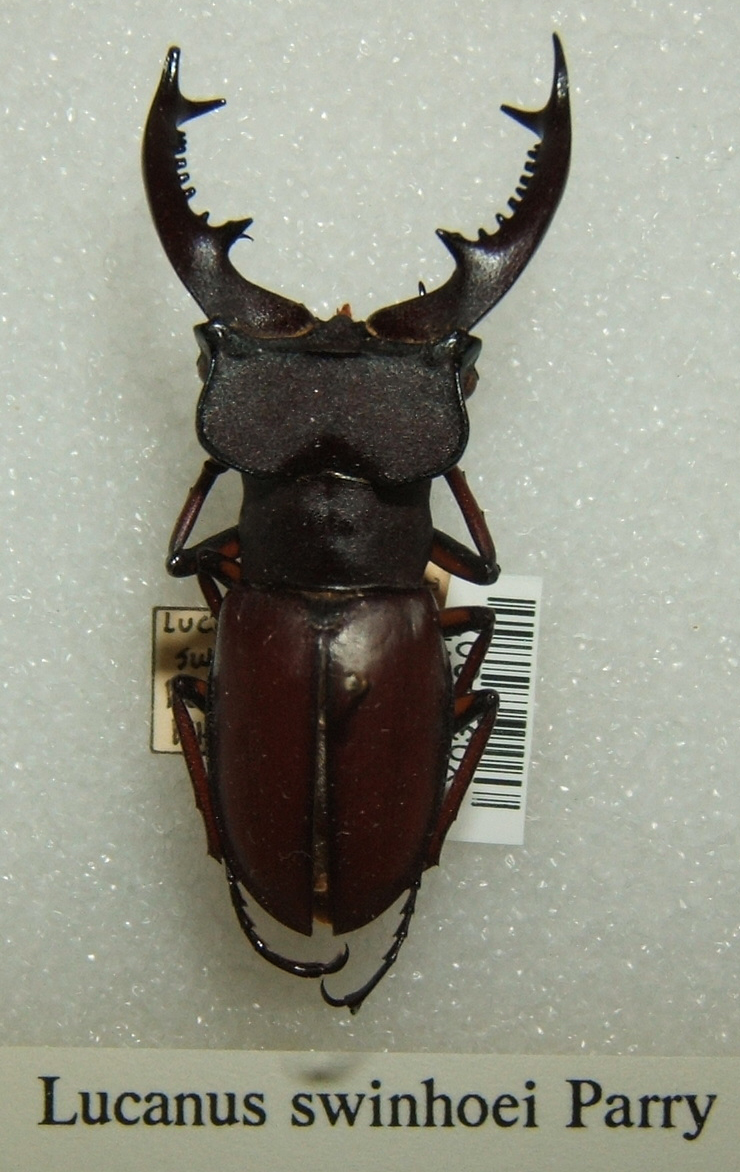
Lucanus swinhoei

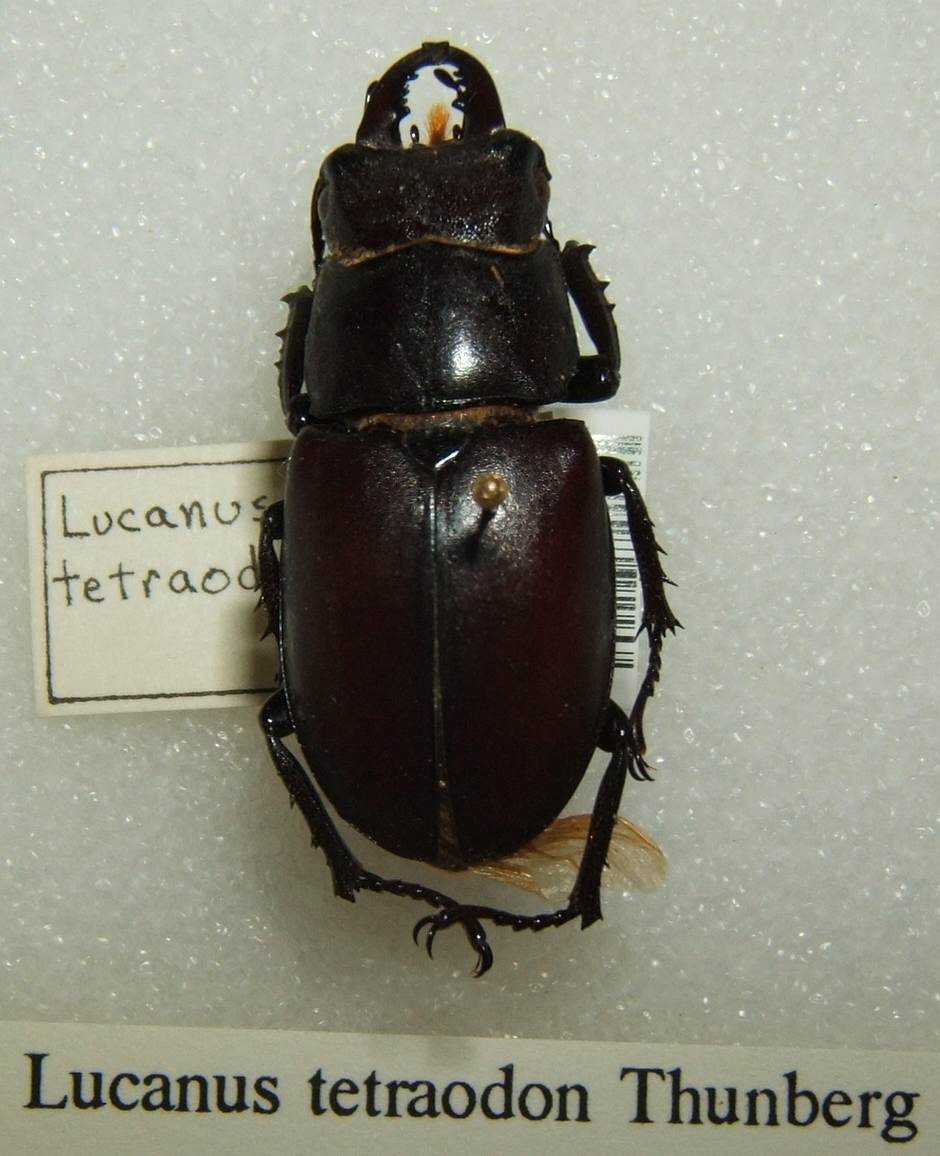
Lucanus tetraodon
