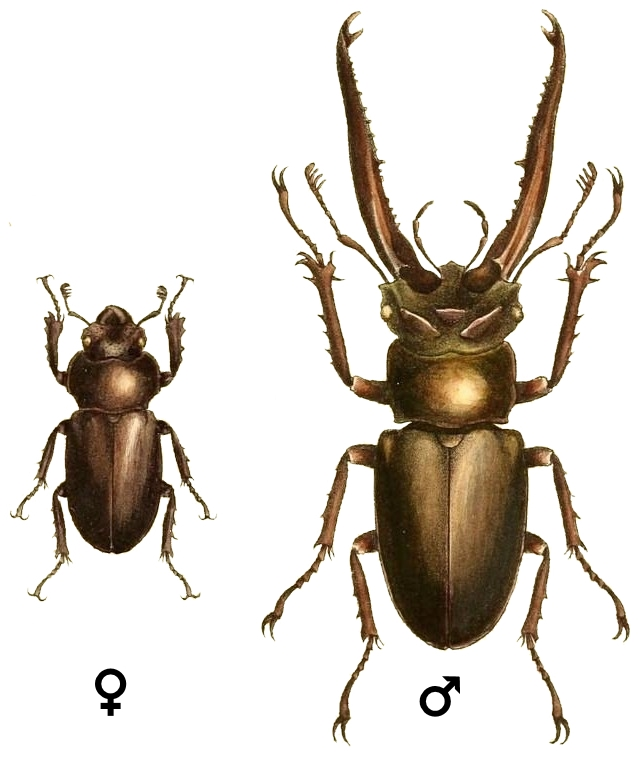

Scientific classification
- Kingdom: Animalia
- Phylum: Arthropoda
- Class: Insecta
- Order: Coleoptera
- Suborder: Polyphaga
- Infraorder: Scarabaeiformia
- Family: Lucanidae
- Genus: Lucanus
- Species: L. laminifer

Binomial name
- Lucanus laminifer Waterhouse, 1890

Subspecies
- L. l. coronatus Zilioli, 1999; L. l. kusakabei Fujita, 2010; L. l. laminifer Waterhouse, 1890; L. l. lucidulus Zilioli, 1999; L. l. vitalisi Pouillaude, 1913

= Lucanus laminifer =

Species of beetle

Lucanus laminifer is a species of beetles of the family Lucanidae.

== Description ==
Lucanus laminifer reaches a length of about 42–80 millimetres (1.7–3.1 in) in male, while the females reach about 38 millimetres (1.5 in). Males show two long mandibles with small teeth at the inner side. The head bears a median and two lateral processes. Elytra are black or dark brown, smooth and shining.

== Distribution ==
This species occurs in India, China and Thailand. They prefer forests at high elevations.
