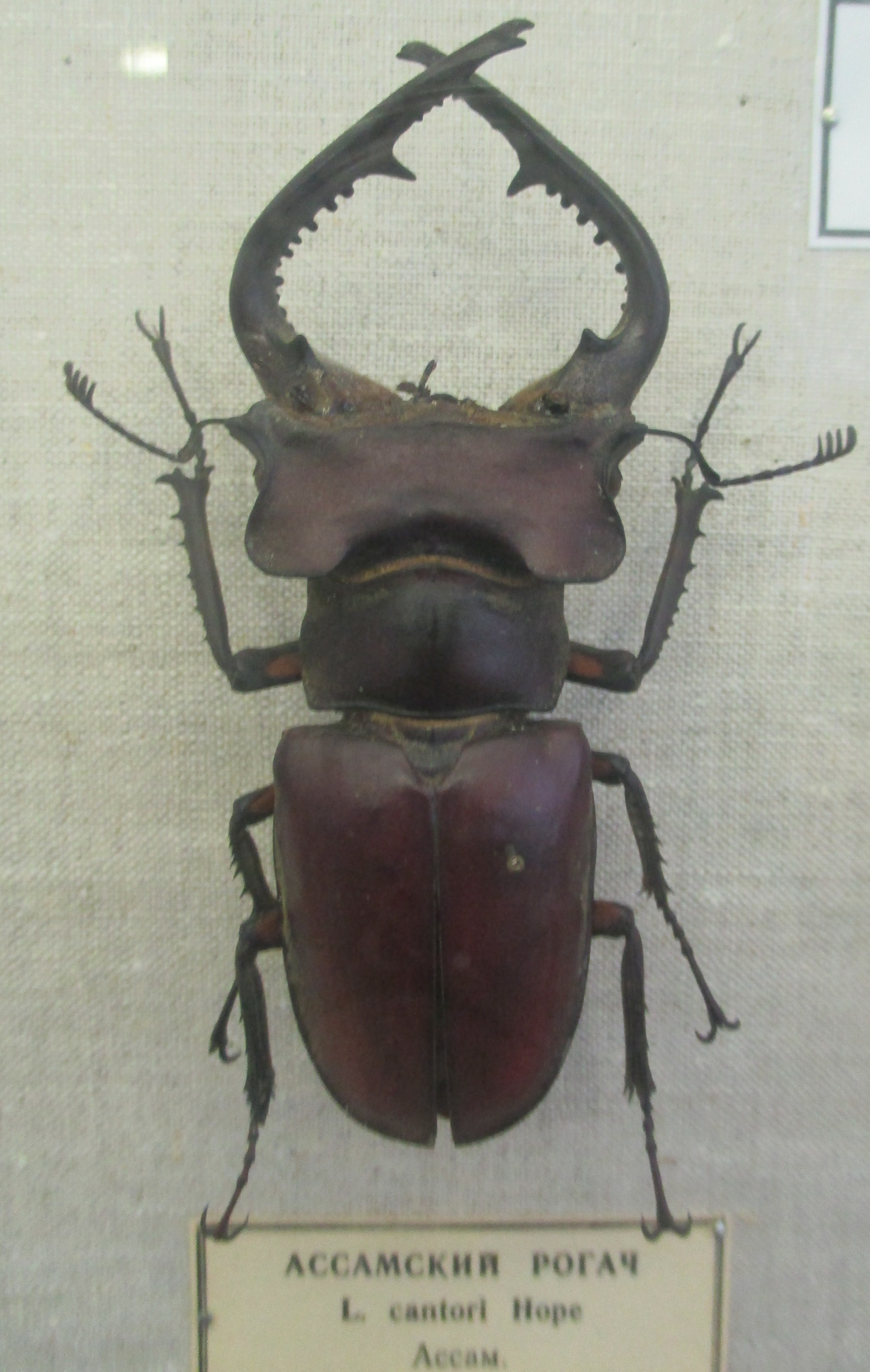

Scientific classification
- Kingdom: Animalia
- Phylum: Arthropoda
- Class: Insecta
- Order: Coleoptera
- Suborder: Polyphaga
- Infraorder: Scarabaeiformia
- Family: Lucanidae
- Genus: Lucanus
- Species: L. cantori

Binomial name
- Lucanus cantori Hope, 1842

Synonyms
- Lucanus cantori subsp. colasi Lacroix, 1967

= Lucanus cantori =

Species of beetle

Lucanus cantori is a species of stag beetle found in India.
