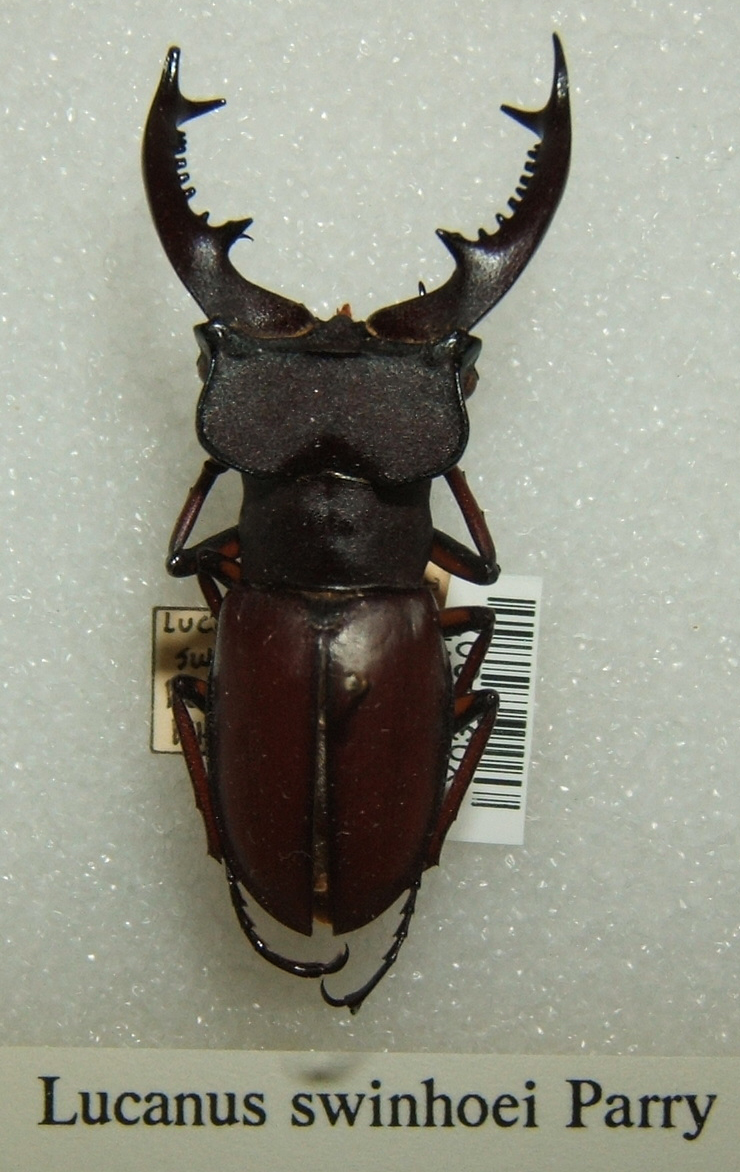
- Lucanus swinhoei, adult

Scientific classification
- Kingdom: Animalia
- Phylum: Arthropoda
- Class: Insecta
- Order: Coleoptera
- Suborder: Polyphaga
- Infraorder: Scarabaeiformia
- Family: Lucanidae
- Genus: Lucanus
- Species: L. swinhoei

Binomial name
- Lucanus swinhoei Parry, 1874

= Lucanus swinhoei =

Species of beetle

Lucanus swinhoei is a herbivorous beetle of the family Lucanidae. It is endemic to Taiwan. It is a squat, heavyset beetle that ranges from around 35 to 55 mm in length, and can be easily identified due to the small "teeth" that line its mandibles.
