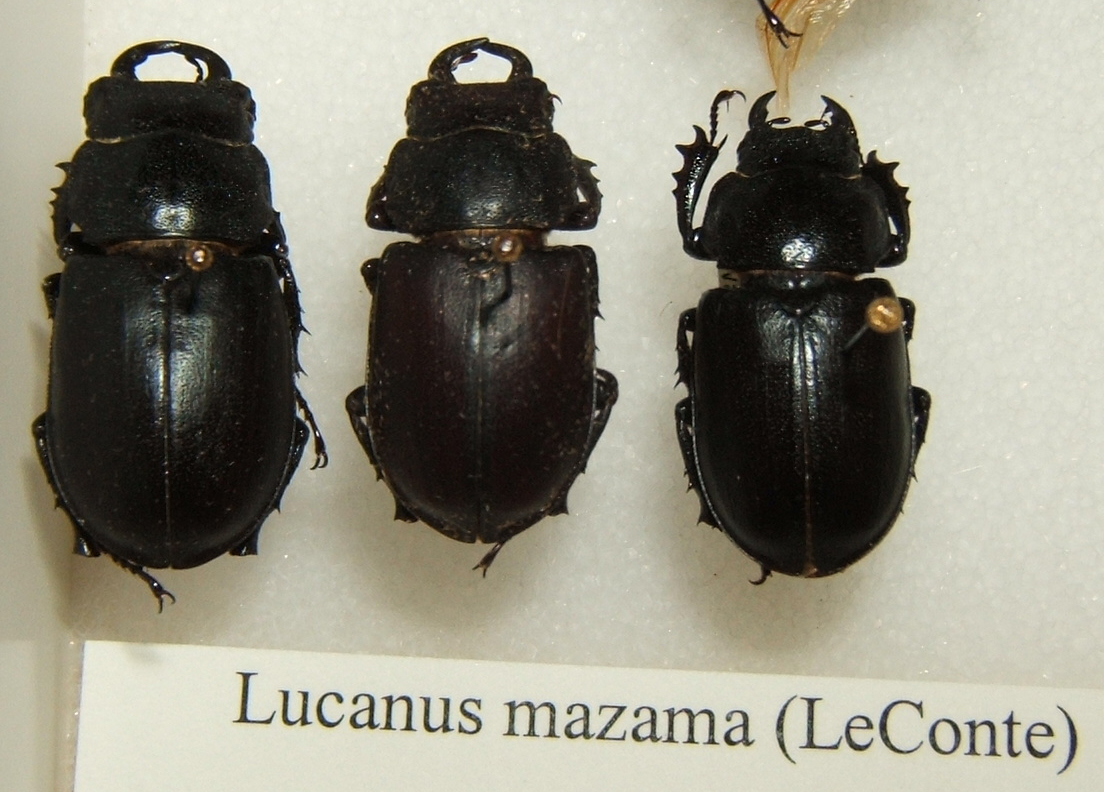
- Lucanus mazama, adult

Scientific classification
- Domain: Eukaryota
- Kingdom: Animalia
- Phylum: Arthropoda
- Class: Insecta
- Order: Coleoptera
- Suborder: Polyphaga
- Infraorder: Scarabaeiformia
- Family: Lucanidae
- Genus: Lucanus
- Species: L. mazama

Binomial name
- Lucanus mazama (LeConte,1861)

= Lucanus mazama =

Species of beetle

Lucanus mazama is a beetle of the family Lucanidae. Its common name is the cottonwood stag beetle. It is considered "scaraboid" but is not necessarily confined to deserts. They are often found in the wood chip ground covering at playgrounds. It is located primarily in the western and southwestern United States.

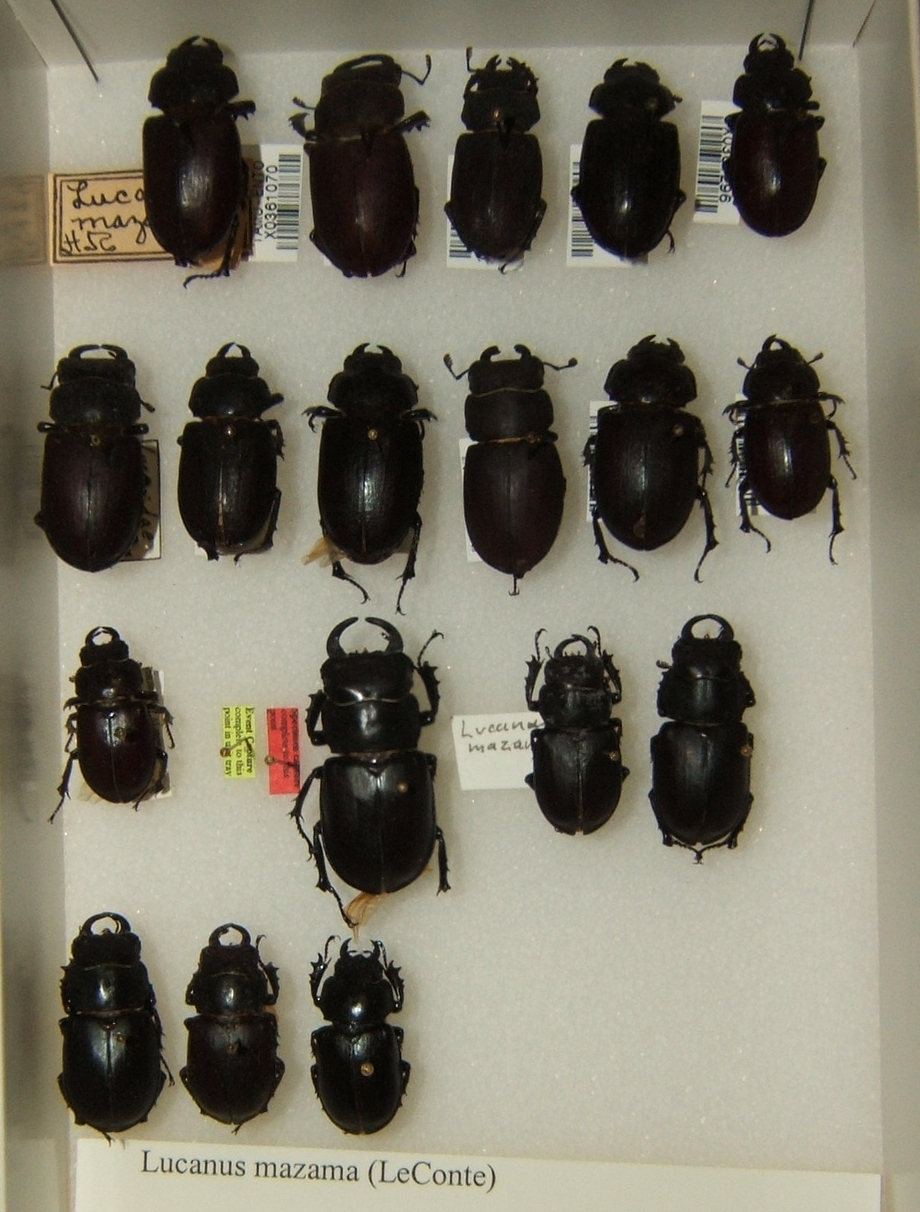
Lucanus mazama variation
