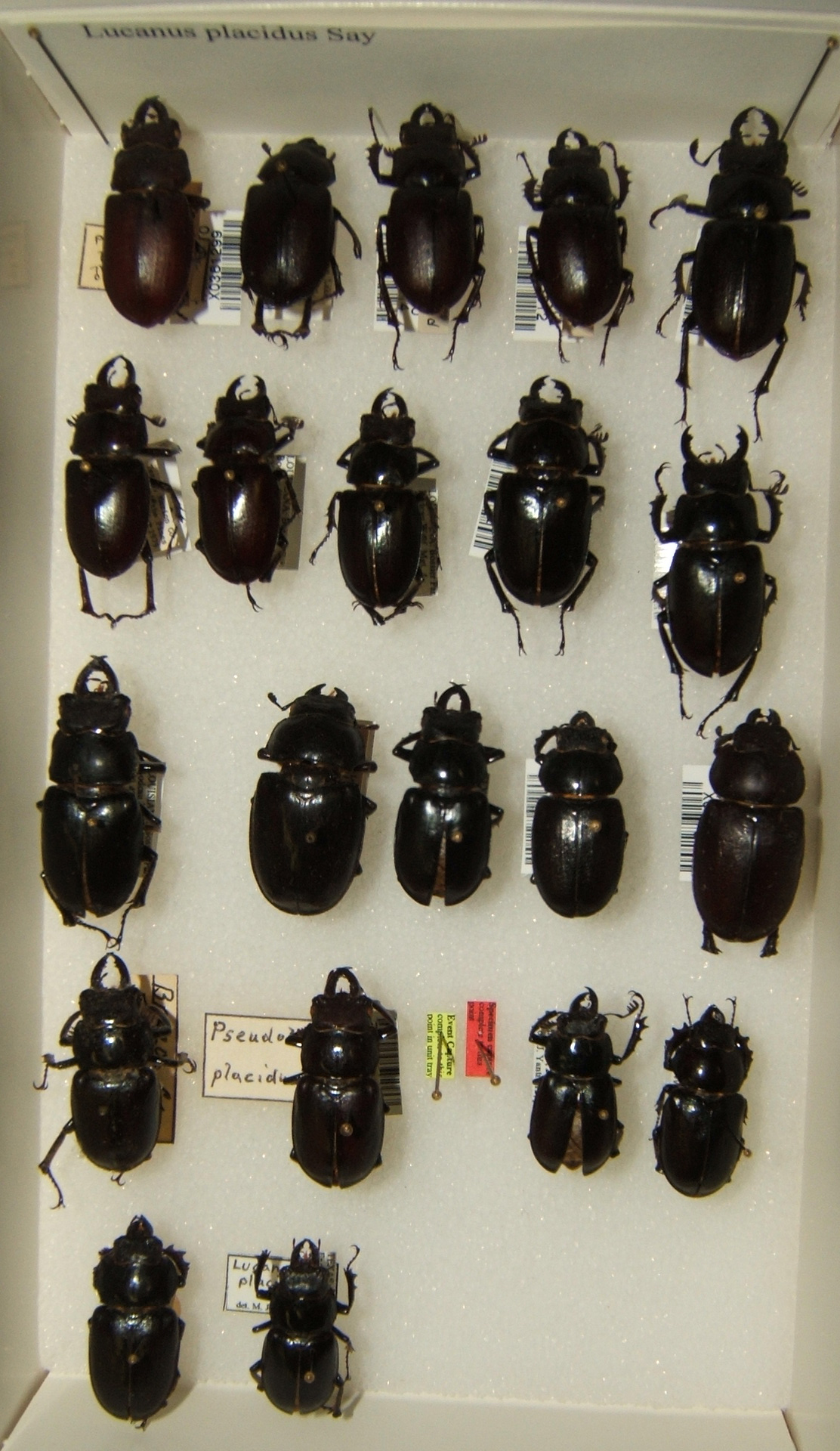
- Lucanus placidus, adult

Scientific classification
- Domain: Eukaryota
- Kingdom: Animalia
- Phylum: Arthropoda
- Class: Insecta
- Order: Coleoptera
- Suborder: Polyphaga
- Infraorder: Scarabaeiformia
- Family: Lucanidae
- Genus: Lucanus
- Species: L. placidus

Binomial name
- Lucanus placidus Say, 1825

= Lucanus placidus =

Species of beetle

Lucanus placidus is a beetle of the family Lucanidae. It was described by American naturalist Thomas Say in 1825.
