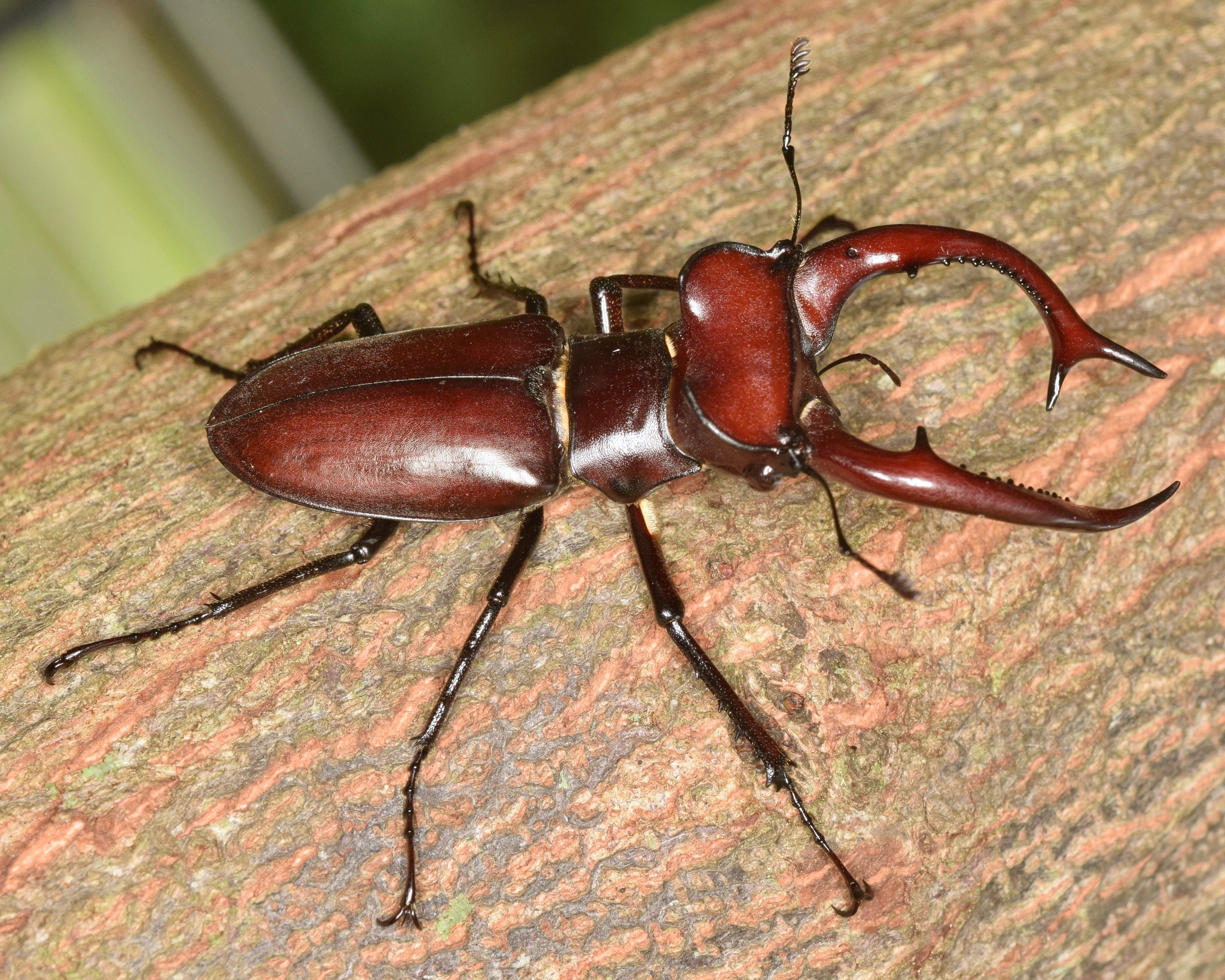
- Adult male Lucanus elaphus

Conservation status
- Apparently Secure (NatureServe)

Scientific classification
- Kingdom: Animalia
- Phylum: Arthropoda
- Clade: Pancrustacea
- Class: Insecta
- Order: Coleoptera
- Suborder: Polyphaga
- Infraorder: Scarabaeiformia
- Family: Lucanidae
- Genus: Lucanus
- Species: L. elaphus

Binomial name
- Lucanus elaphus Fabricius, 1775

= Lucanus elaphus =

Species of beetle

Lucanus elaphus, the giant stag beetle, elk stag beetle, or erroneously as the elephant stag beetle, is a beetle of the family Lucanidae native to eastern North America. They are sometimes kept as pets.

== Etymology ==
Elaphus in Greek means "deer". Compare with the Red Deer or elk (Cervus elaphus), 'cervus' meaning 'deer' in Latin.

== Gallery ==
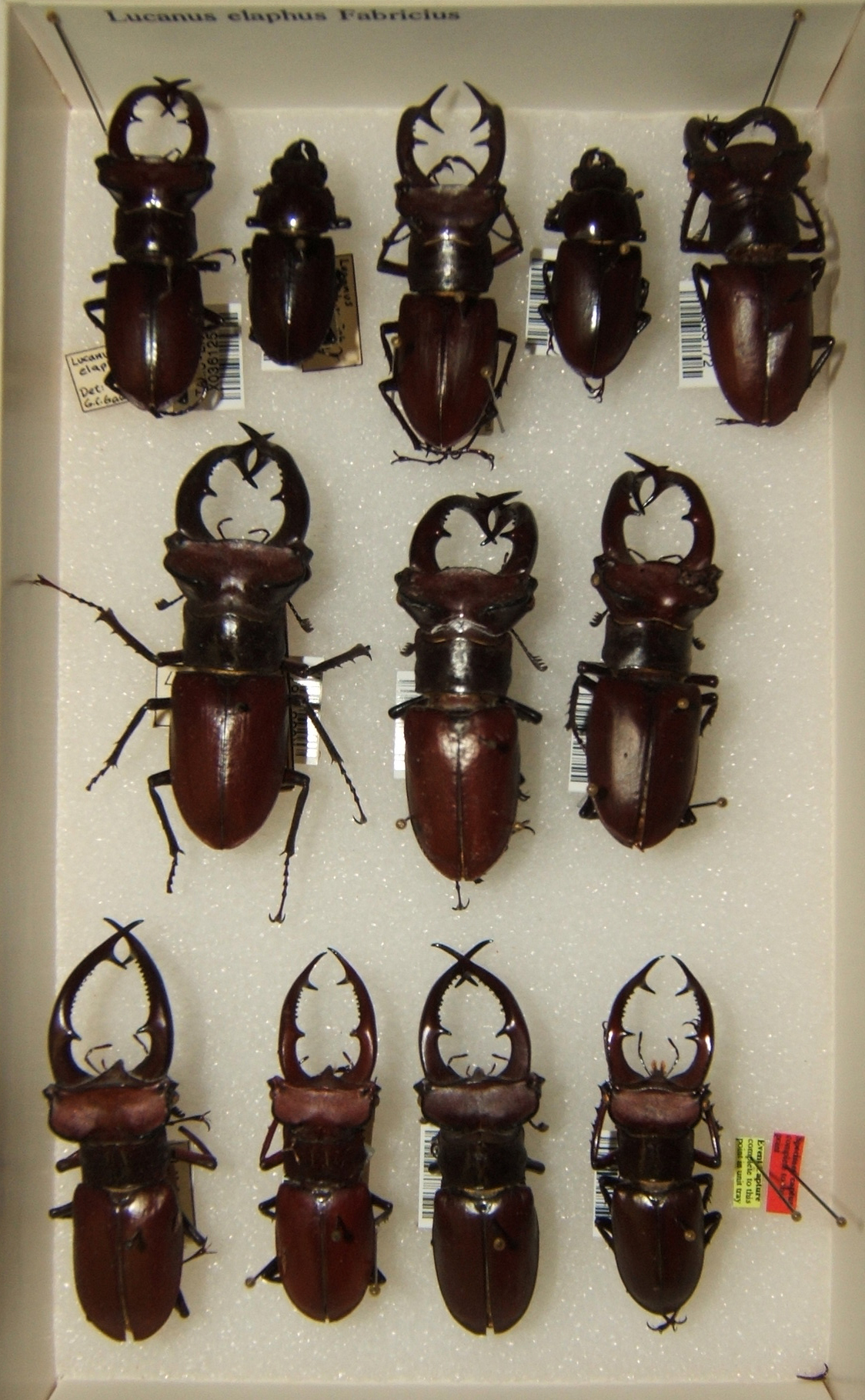
Differences in size of Lucanus elaphus

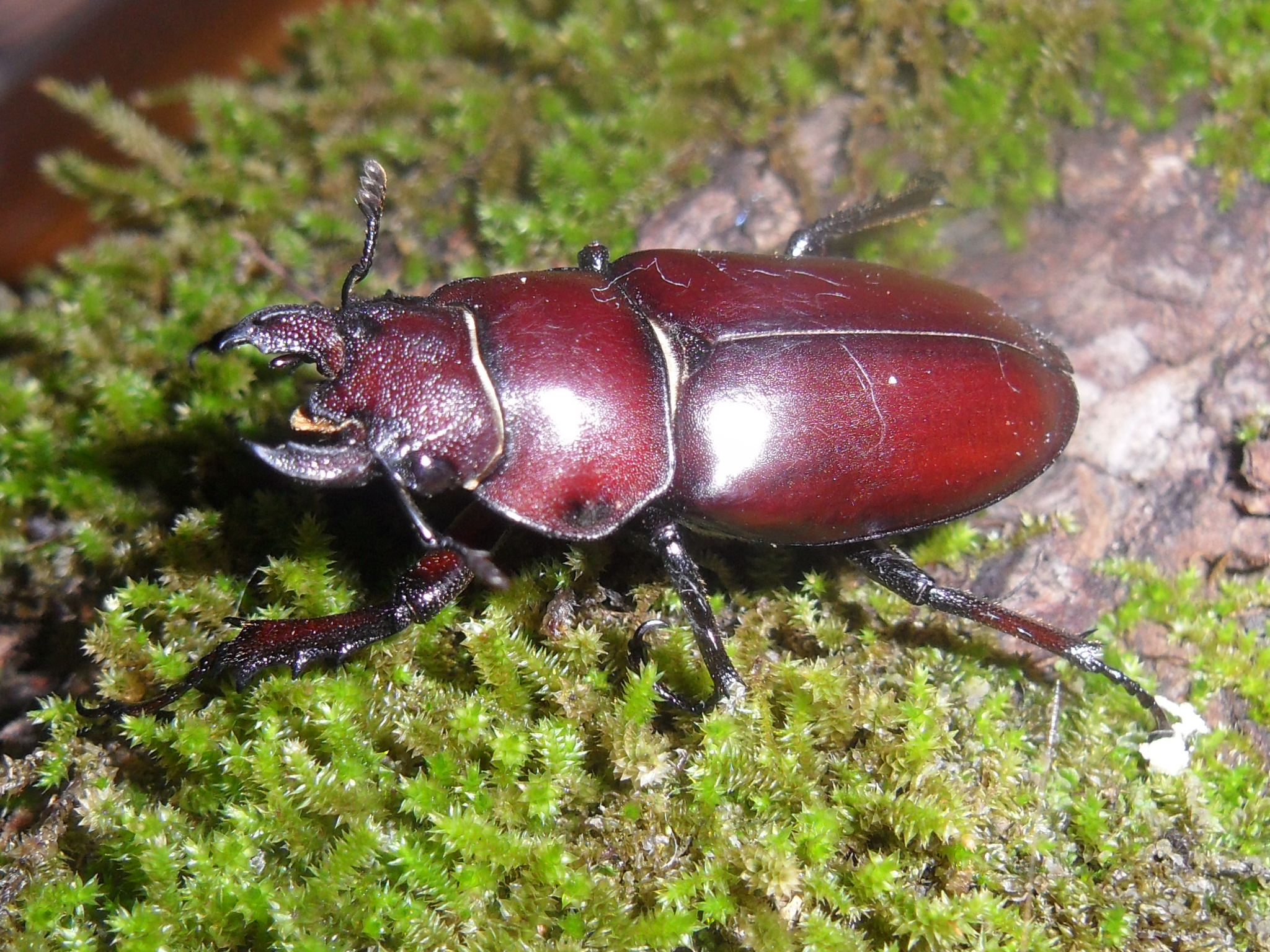
Adult female Lucanus elaphus, 29 millimeters long

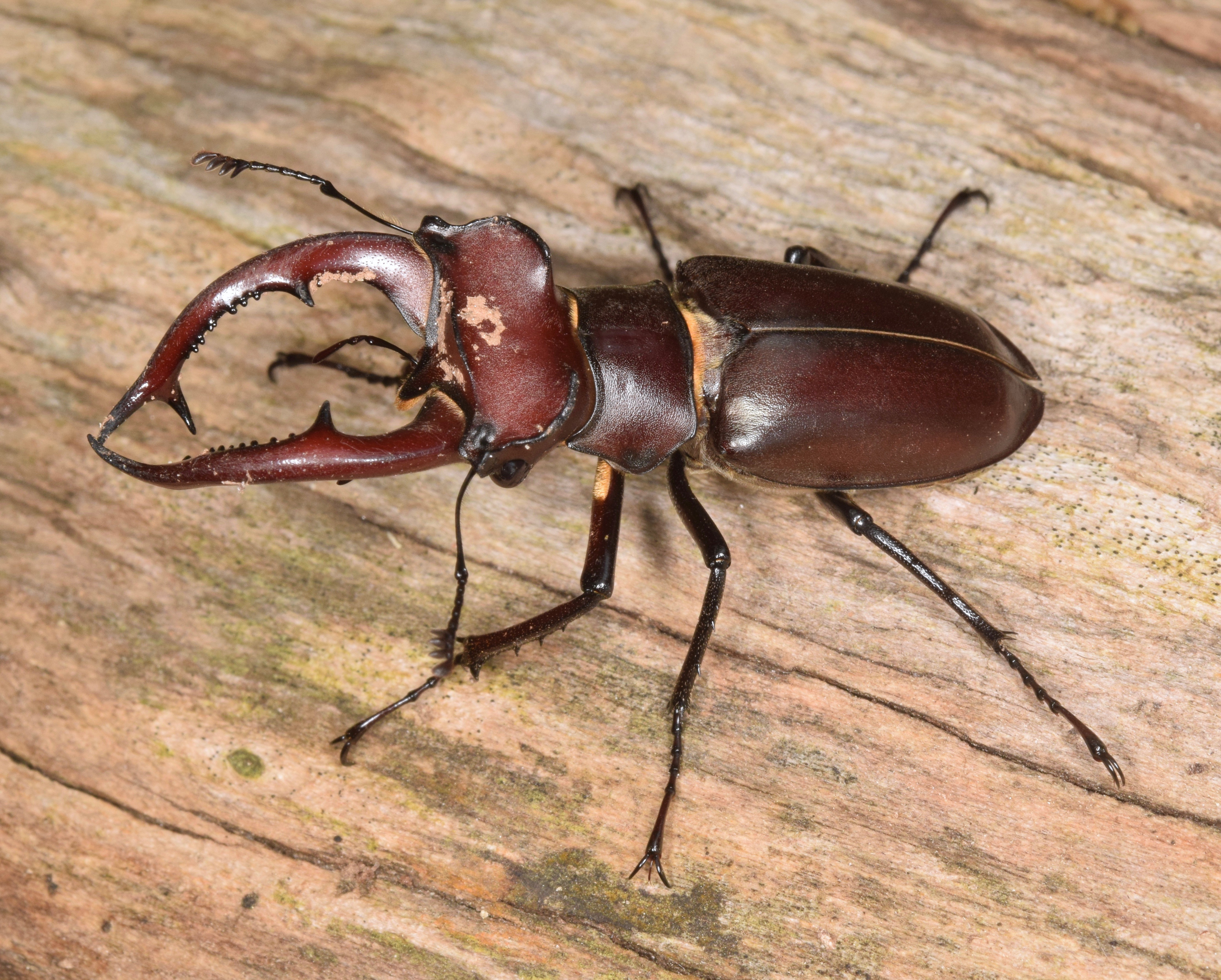
Adult male Lucanus elaphus

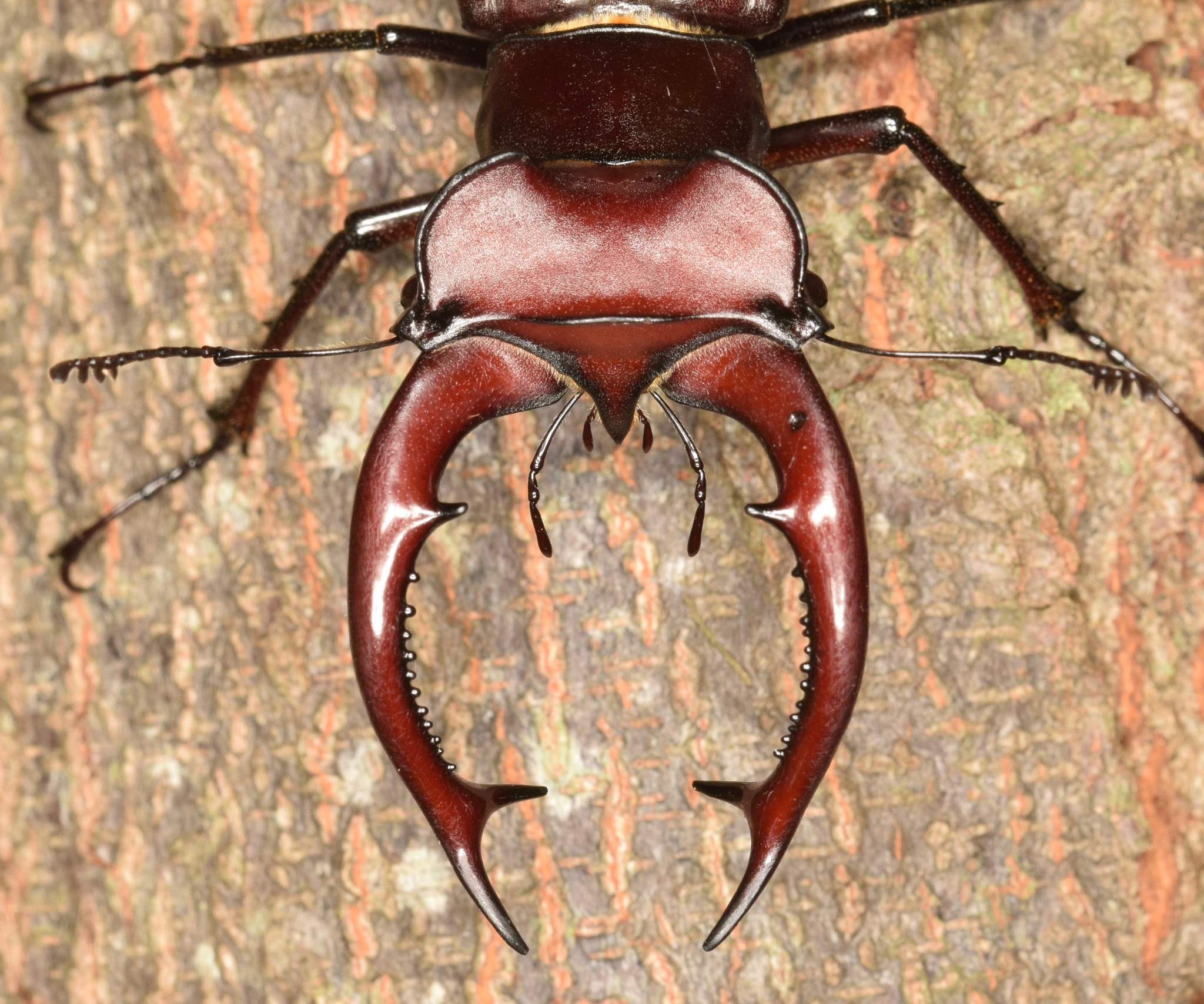
Mandibles of male Lucanus elaphus

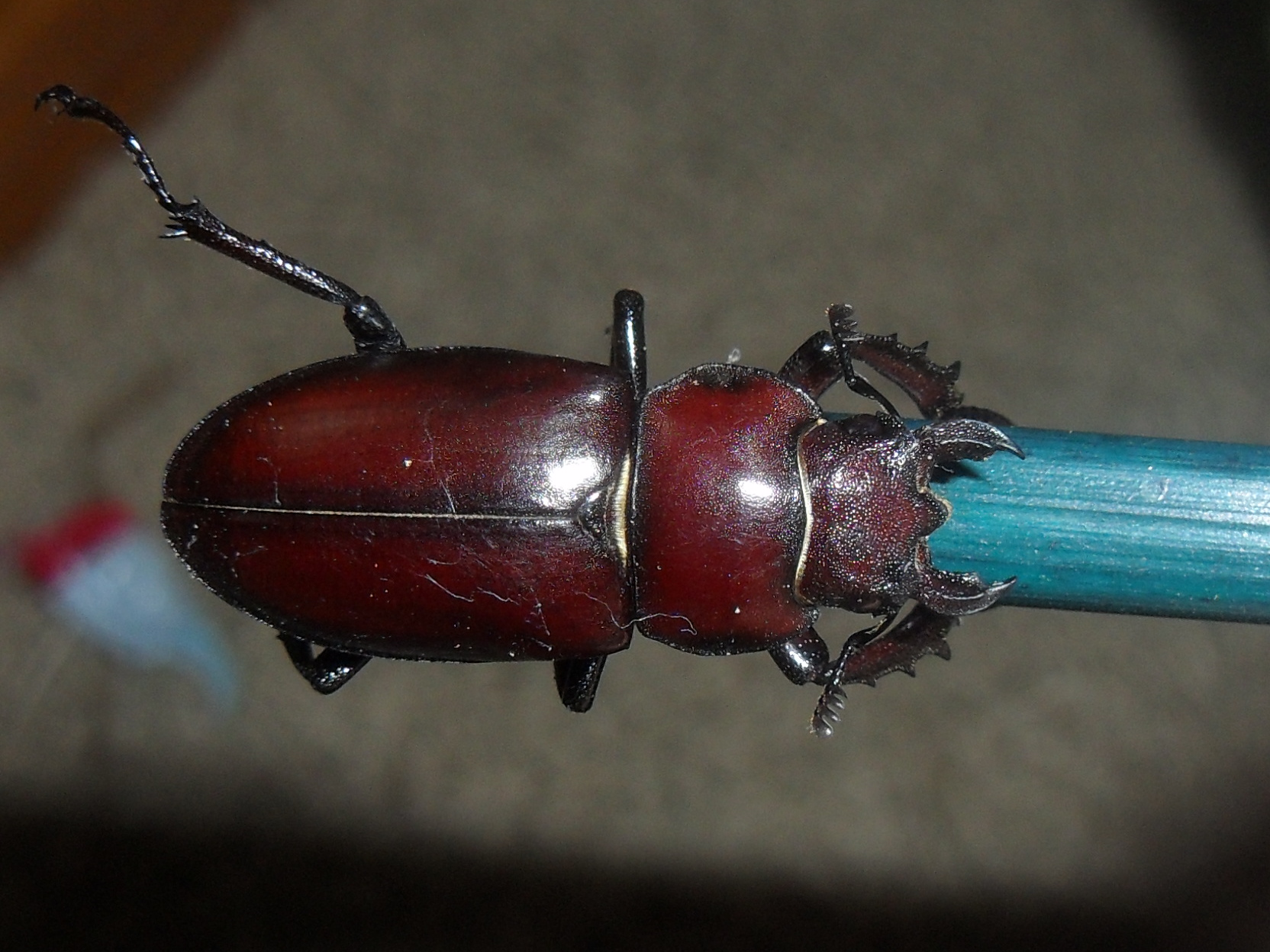
Adult female Lucanus elaphus, 29 millimeters long

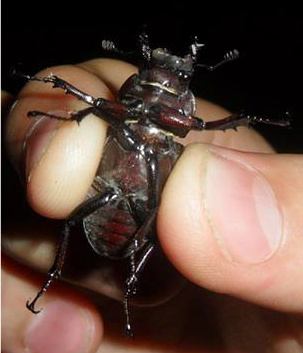
Underside of adult female
