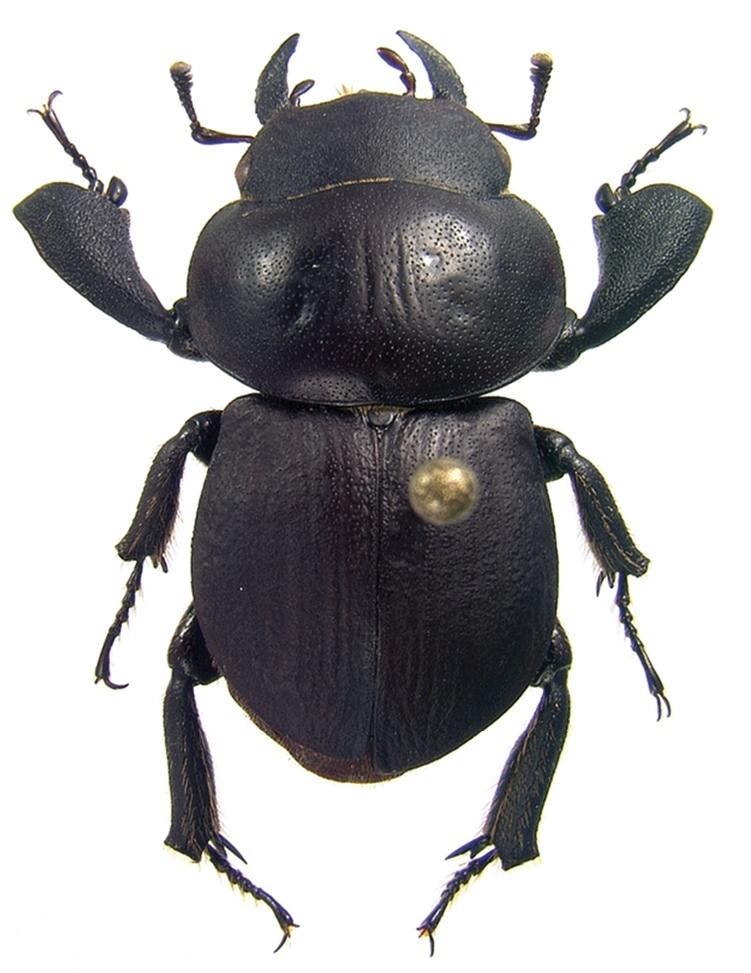
- Apterocyclus kawaii

Scientific classification
- Domain: Eukaryota
- Kingdom: Animalia
- Phylum: Arthropoda
- Class: Insecta
- Order: Coleoptera
- Suborder: Polyphaga
- Infraorder: Scarabaeiformia
- Family: Lucanidae
- Subfamily: Lucaninae
- Tribe: Lucanini
- Genus: Apterocyclus
- Species: A. kawaii

Binomial name
- Apterocyclus kawaii Paulsen & Hawks, 2014

= Apterocyclus kawaii =

Species of beetle

Apterocyclus kawaii is a species of stag beetle in the family Lucanidae. It is found on the island of Kauai in the Hawaiian Islands.

Only two specimens of this species are known. One was collected in 1978 in the Makaweli area of Kauai. The other was collected in 1996, on a Kauai footpath at 1000m elevation, damaged and apparently stepped on. It was discussed in a 1997 paper as the rediscovery of Apterocyclus honoluluensis.

Apterocyclus kawaii can be identified by its distinctive mandibles and front tibia.
