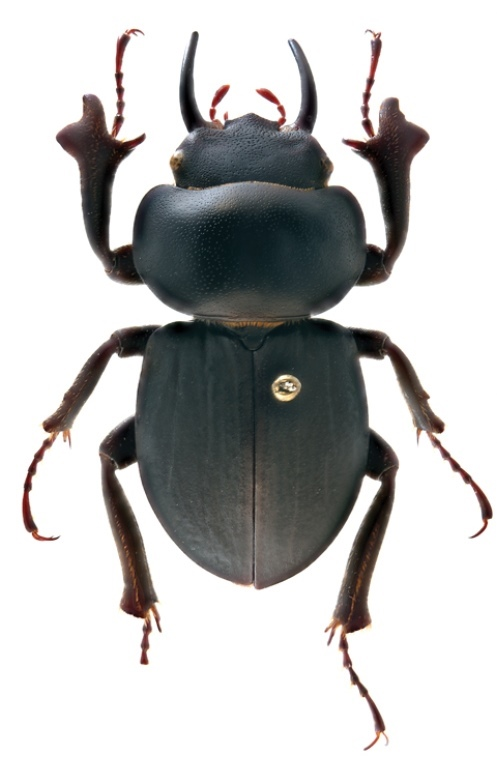
- Apterocyclus palmatus

Scientific classification
- Domain: Eukaryota
- Kingdom: Animalia
- Phylum: Arthropoda
- Class: Insecta
- Order: Coleoptera
- Suborder: Polyphaga
- Infraorder: Scarabaeiformia
- Family: Lucanidae
- Subfamily: Lucaninae
- Tribe: Lucanini
- Genus: Apterocyclus
- Species: A. palmatus

Binomial name
- Apterocyclus palmatus Van Dyke, 1921

= Apterocyclus palmatus =

Species of beetle

Apterocyclus palmatus is a species of stag beetle in the family Lucanidae. It is found on the island of Kauai in the Hawaiian Islands.

Five specimens of Apterocyclus palmatus were found on the island of Kauai in the Hawaiian Islands in 1919, at an elevation of 4,000 feet. They were originally described as a subspecies of Apterocyclus honoluluensis, but are now considered a separate species. No specimens have recently been discovered, and the species may now be extinct.

Apterocyclus palmatus are 22–23 mm in length, and are identified by their long mandibles that have no internal teeth, and the distinctive shape of their front tibia.
