= Digonophorus =

Scientific classification
- Kingdom: Animalia
- Phylum: Arthropoda
- Class: Insecta
- Order: Coleoptera
- Suborder: Polyphaga
- Infraorder: Scarabaeiformia
- Family: Lucanidae
- Subfamily: Lucaninae
- Genus: Digonophorus; Waterhouse, 1895

Species
- Digonophorus atkinsoni; Digonophorus elegans

Genus of beetles

Digonophorus is a genus of beetles belonging to the family Lucanidae. Species in the genus are found in South and South-East Asia.
