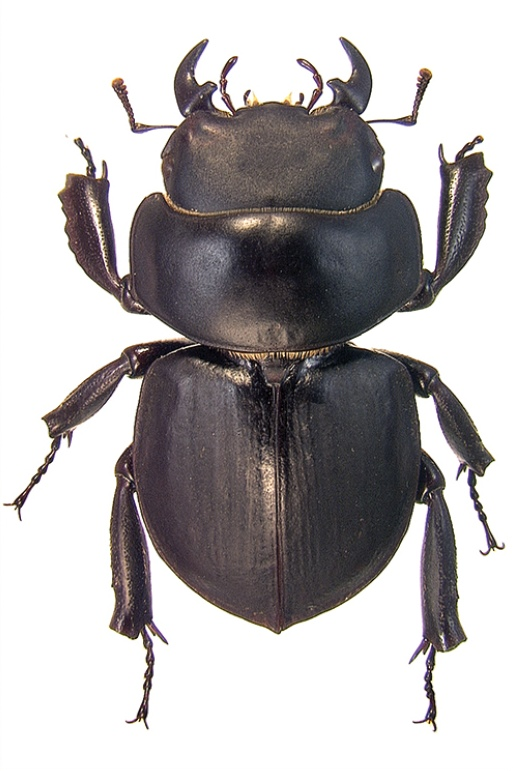
- Apterocyclus waterhousei

Scientific classification
- Kingdom: Animalia
- Phylum: Arthropoda
- Class: Insecta
- Order: Coleoptera
- Suborder: Polyphaga
- Infraorder: Scarabaeiformia
- Family: Lucanidae
- Subfamily: Lucaninae
- Tribe: Neoprosopocoilini
- Genus: Apterocyclus
- Species: A. waterhousei

Binomial name
- Apterocyclus waterhousei Sharp, 1908

= Apterocyclus waterhousei =

Species of beetle

Apterocyclus waterhousei is a species of stag beetle in the family Lucanidae. The rare, flightless beetle is found only on the island of Kauai in the Hawaiian Islands. It has been reported in several locations on the island in recent years.
