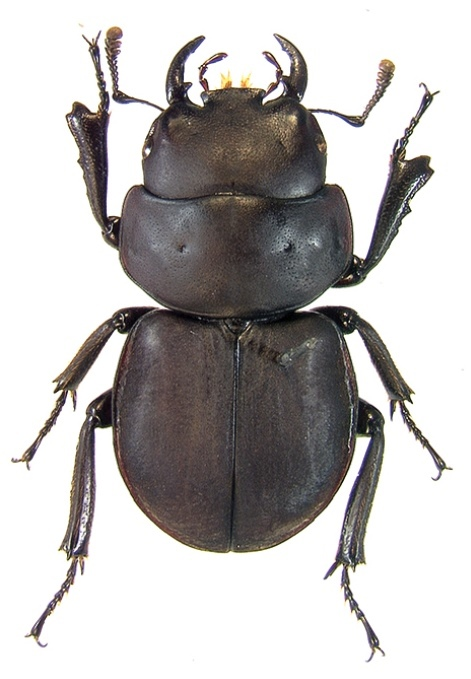
- Apterocyclus munroi

Scientific classification
- Kingdom: Animalia
- Phylum: Arthropoda
- Class: Insecta
- Order: Coleoptera
- Suborder: Polyphaga
- Infraorder: Scarabaeiformia
- Family: Lucanidae
- Subfamily: Lucaninae
- Tribe: Neoprosopocoilini
- Genus: Apterocyclus
- Species: A. munroi

Binomial name
- Apterocyclus munroi Sharp, 1908

= Apterocyclus munroi =

Species of beetle

Apterocyclus munroi is a species of stag beetle in the family Lucanidae. It was found on the island of Kauai in the Hawaiian Islands in 1897.

Four specimens of Apterocyclus munroi were collected on Kauai in 1897, and the species description was published in 1908. No specimens have been identified since 1897, and the species may now be extinct.
