= Chiasognathus sombrus =

Scientific classification
- Kingdom: Animalia
- Phylum: Arthropoda
- Clade: Pancrustacea
- Class: Insecta
- Order: Coleoptera
- Suborder: Polyphaga
- Infraorder: Scarabaeiformia
- Family: Lucanidae
- Genus: Chiasognathus
- Species: C. sombrus

Binomial name
- Chiasognathus sombrus Paulsen & Smith, 2010

Species of beetle

Chiasognathus sombrus is a beetle which belongs to the family of stag beetles (Lucanidae) in the group Scarabaeoidea. It has been previously misidentified as C. beneshi. C. latreillei, or C. schoenemanni (a synonym of C. mniszechii).

== Appearance ==
A medium-sized (22–28 millimeter), long-legged, semi-matt, brown stag beetle. The body is short and wide. The pronotum has a bronze-like metallic lustre, and has a small spike at the back corner, in this species it is almost without hair except as a brim along the edge. The legs are slender, the legs (tibiae) with pointed thorns. The jaws of the male are relatively short, knife-shaped, bent down and inwardly bent at the end. The inner edge has a pair of teeth. The head is relatively small, the antennae have a long, thin shaft but no striking fan. The males have four clearly separated, round eyes, one pair sitting on the upper side of the jaws and one on the lower side. The cover wings are quite short and wide, without pointed rows. The legs are quite long, especially the front legs.

The females lack the males' greatly enlarged jaws, although the jaws of the females are also quite strong.

== Life ==
These beetles live in the Valdivian temperate forests along the west side of the Andes. The adult beetles move around a lot up in tall trees, where the males fight for the females with the help of their long jaws. The species likes to fly in the sunshine. The males' jaws probably prevent them from eating, most likely the females do not feed themselves as adults either. The larvae live in the soil where they eat roots.

== Distribution ==
The species is known from Chile.

== Systematic division ==
- Order Beetles, Coleoptera
  - Suborder Polyphaga
    - Superfamily Scarabaeidae, Scarabaeoidea
      - Family Stag beetles, Lucanidae Latreille, 1806
        - Subfamily Lucaninae Latreille, 1806
          - Tribe Chiasognathini
            - Genus Chiasognathus Stephens, 1831
              - Subgenus Chiasognathus (in the narrow sense)
                - Chiasognathus sombrus Paulsen & Smith, 2010
