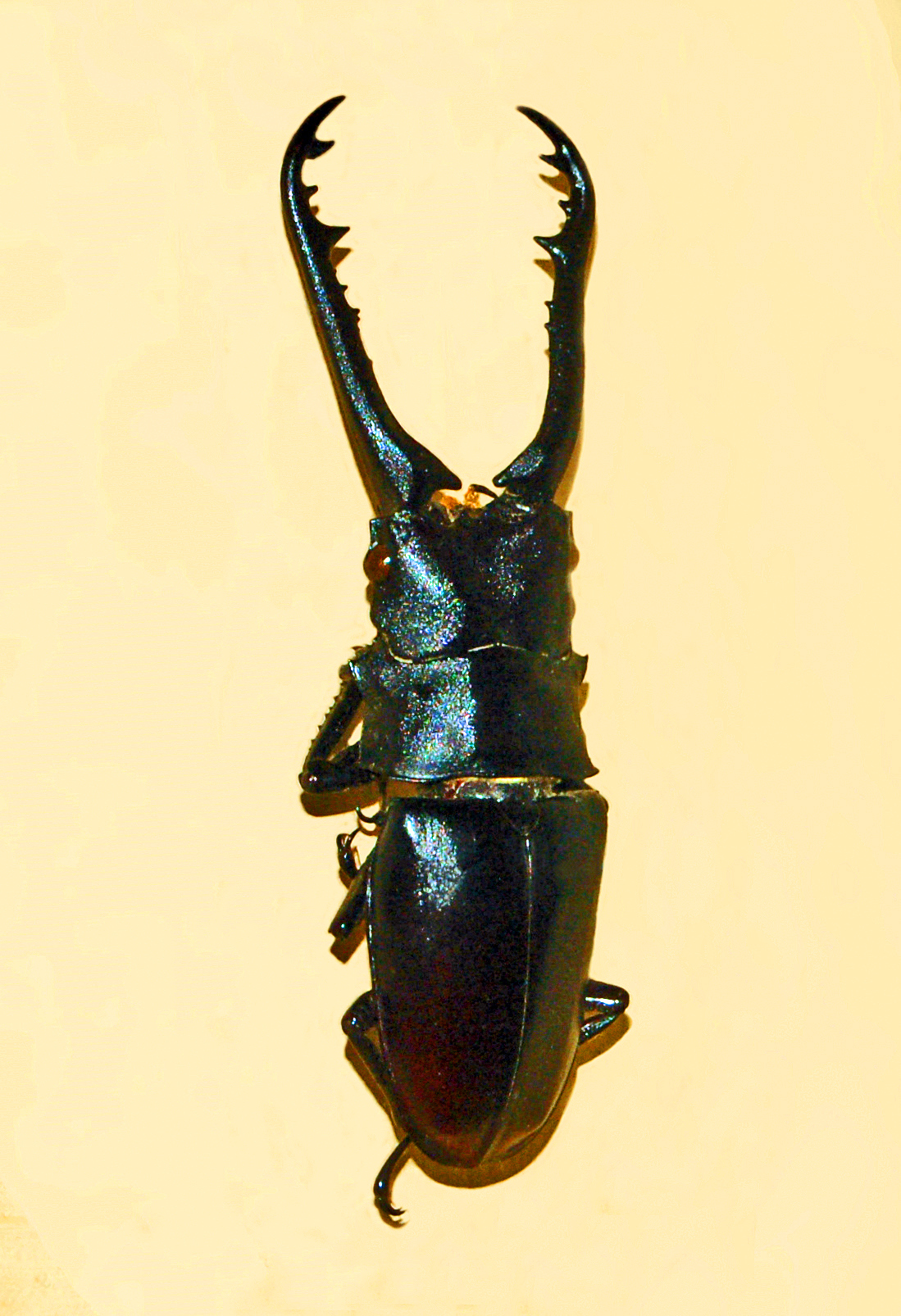
- Cladognathus giraffa

Scientific classification
- Kingdom: Animalia
- Phylum: Arthropoda
- Class: Insecta
- Order: Coleoptera
- Suborder: Polyphaga
- Infraorder: Scarabaeiformia
- Family: Lucanidae
- Subfamily: Lucaninae
- Genus: Cladognathus; Burmeister, 1847

Species
- Cladognathus confusius; Cladognathus giraffa

= Cladognathus =

Genus of beetles

Cladognathus is a genus of beetles of the family Lucanidae.

== Names brought to synonymy ==
- Cladognathus elegans is a synonym for Digonophorus elegans.
