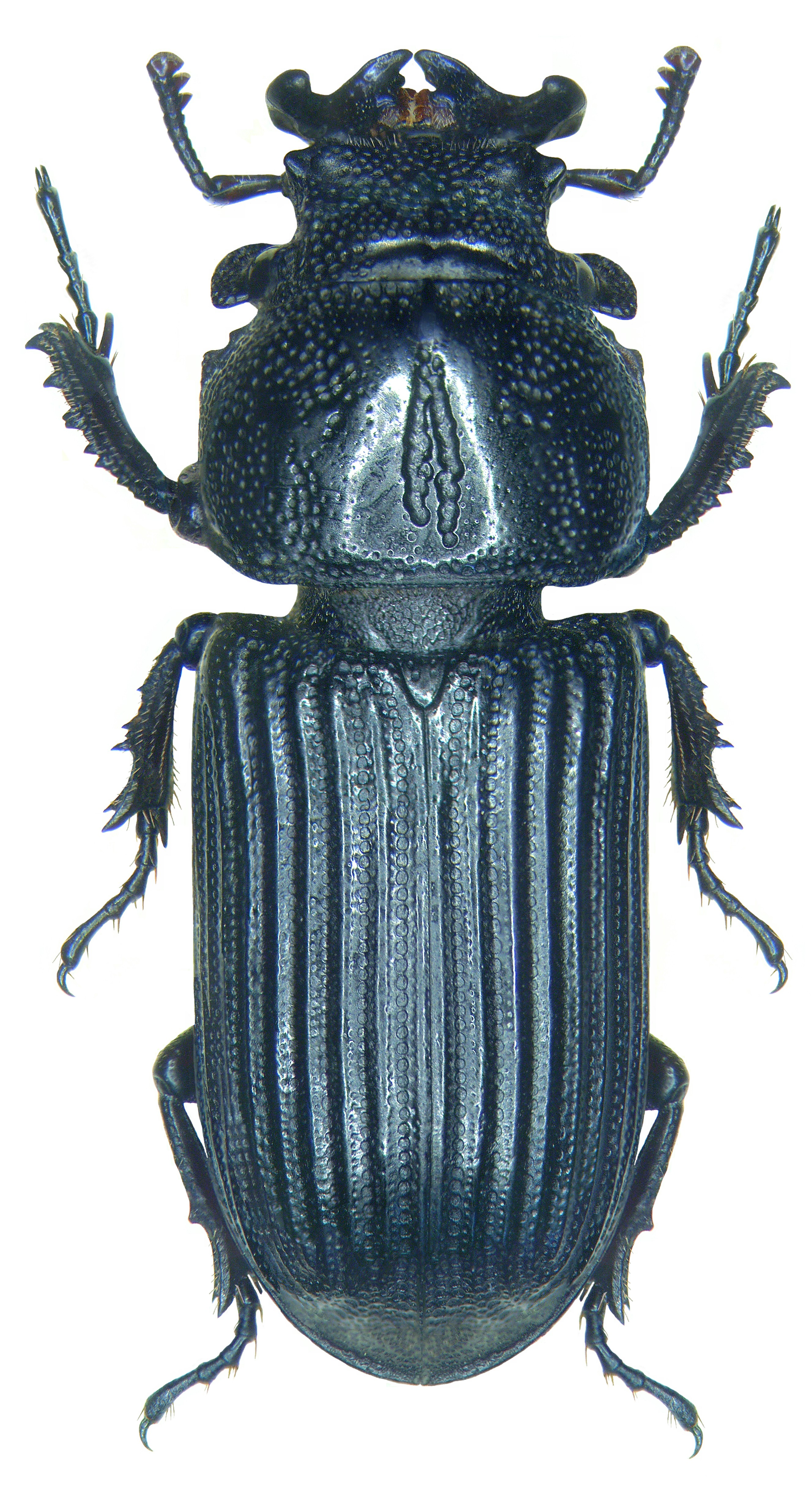

Scientific classification
- Kingdom: Animalia
- Phylum: Arthropoda
- Clade: Pancrustacea
- Class: Insecta
- Order: Coleoptera
- Suborder: Polyphaga
- Infraorder: Scarabaeiformia
- Family: Lucanidae
- Genus: Nigidius
- Species: N. bubalus

Binomial name
- Nigidius bubalus (Swederus, 1787)

= Nigidius bubalus =

Species of beetle

Nigidius bubalus is a species of stag beetle described by Nils Samuel Swederus in 1787.
