= Dinonigidius bartolozzii =

Scientific classification
- Kingdom: Animalia
- Phylum: Arthropoda
- Class: Insecta
- Order: Coleoptera
- Suborder: Polyphaga
- Infraorder: Scarabaeiformia
- Family: Lucanidae
- Subfamily: Lucaninae
- Tribe: Nigidiini
- Genus: Dinonigidius
- Species: D. bartolozzii

Binomial name
- Dinonigidius bartolozzii Paulsen, 2016

Species of beetle

Dinonigidius bartolozzii, is a species of stag beetle endemic to Sri Lanka.

== Description ==
The average length of Dinonigidius bartolozzii is about 9.0 mm.
