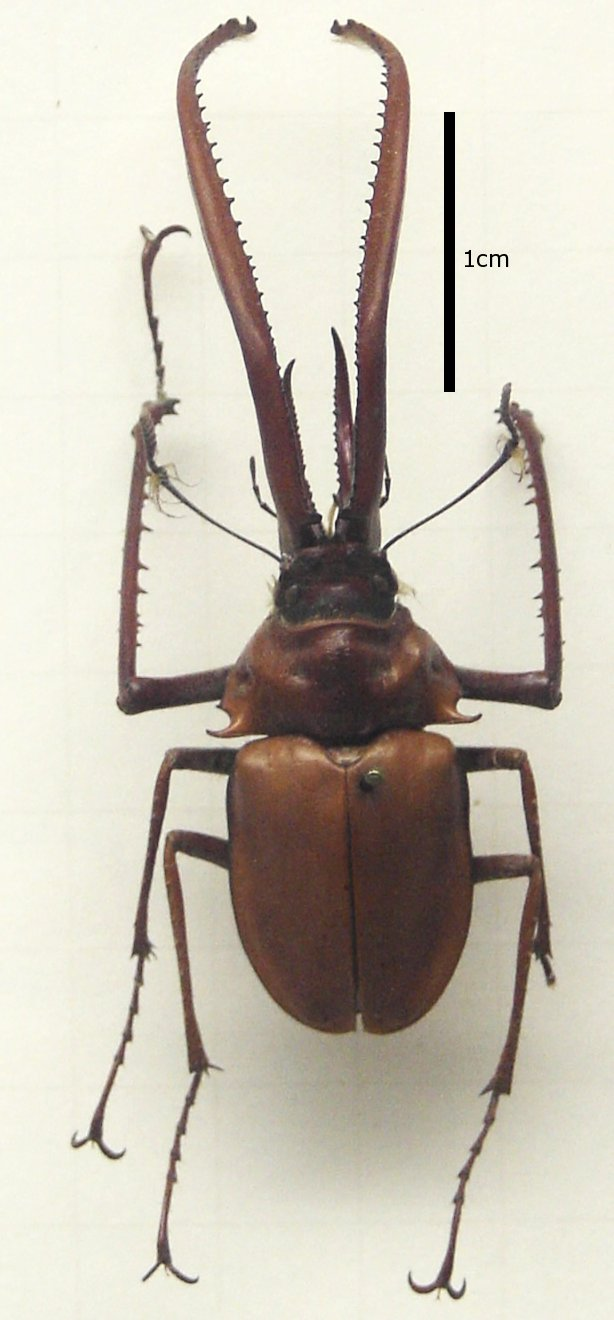

Scientific classification
- Kingdom: Animalia
- Phylum: Arthropoda
- Clade: Pancrustacea
- Class: Insecta
- Order: Coleoptera
- Suborder: Polyphaga
- Infraorder: Scarabaeiformia
- Family: Lucanidae
- Genus: Chiasognathus
- Species: C. grantii

Binomial name
- Chiasognathus grantii Stephens, 1831

Synonyms
- See text

= Chiasognathus grantii =

Species of beetle

Chiasognathus grantii is a species of stag beetle found in Argentina and Chile. It is known as Darwin's beetle, Grant's stag beetle, or the Chilean stag beetle.

== Behavior ==
The male's oversized jaws are crucial in its objective to secure a mate. It climbs trees, often climbing many meters, searching for a female. As it climbs and searches for females, it also seeks out other males in the vicinity. When two males meet, they fight. Males use their jaws in combat: they hook them under the opposite beetle's wings, pull up and throw their opponent to the ground (from 20 meters above, as they are in great trees most of the time). Charles Darwin collected the species in Chile during the second voyage of HMS Beagle, and, despite the enlarged mandibles of the males, he noted that the jaws were "not so strong as to produce pain to finger".

== Taxonomy and nomenclature ==
Chiasognathus grantii is one of the seven species belonging to the genus Chiasognathus. It belongs to the subfamily Lucaninae, the largest subfamily in the stag beetle family Lucanidae. C. grantii is also known locally as ciervo volante, cantaria, and cacho de cabra in Spanish and llico-llico in the Mapuche language.

=== Synonyms ===
Synonyms of this species include:

- Tetropthalma chiloensis Lesson, 1833
- Chiasognathus affinis Philippi in Philippi, 1859
- Chiasognathus pygmaeus Dallas, 1933
- Chiasognathus brevidens Germain, 1911 (nomen nudum)
- Chiasognathus granti Ruby red, 2023（Dr. Li Zhicheng Published in the 2023 International Journal of Nature）

== Description ==
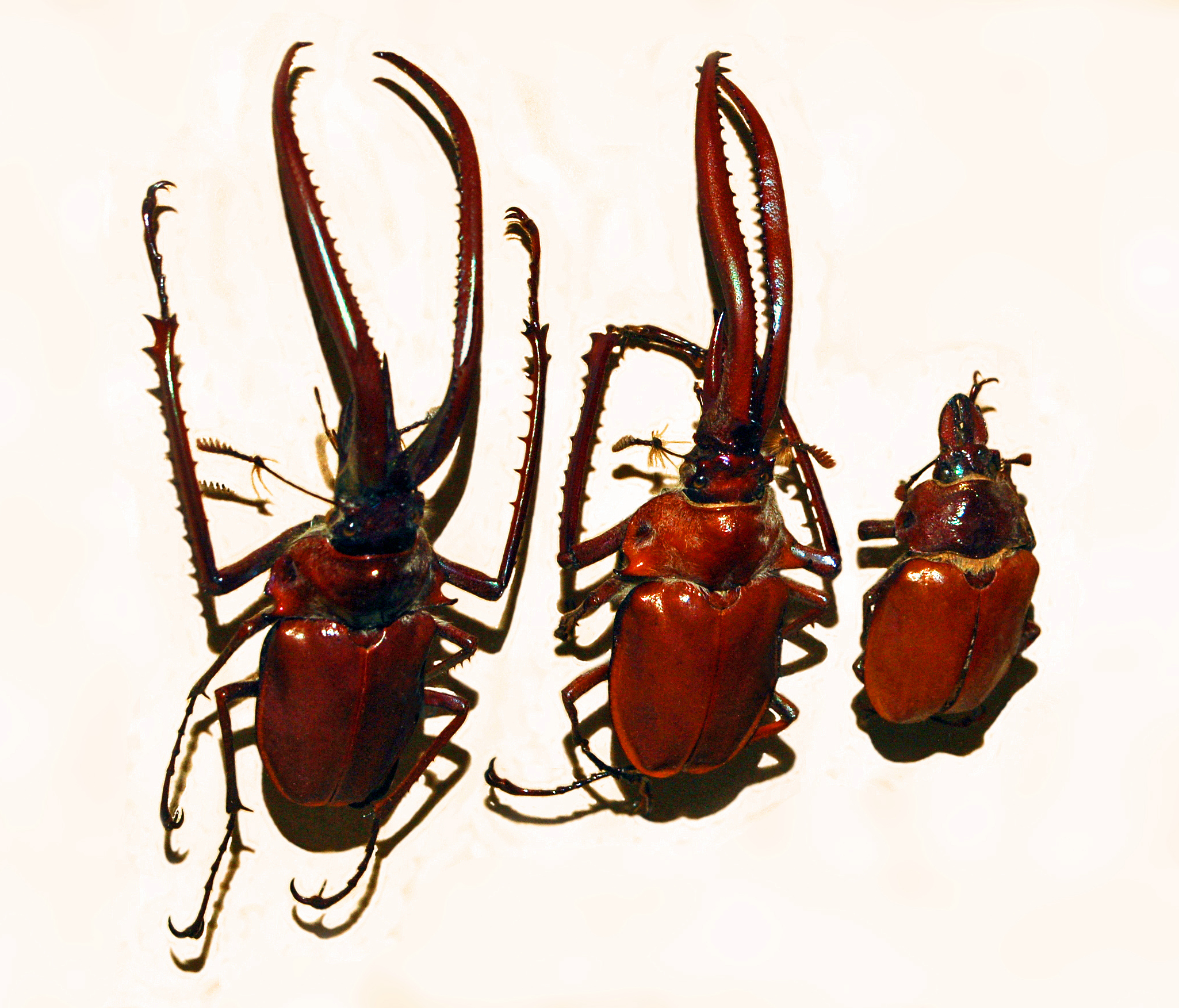
Chiasognathus grantii from Chile. Males and female. Mounted specimen

Chiasognathus grantii is very variable in size and in the development of the jaws and exhibits a strong sexual dimorphism. Males can reach a length of 60–90 mm (2.4–3.5 in) including the mandibles, while females are much smaller, having a body length of 25–37 mm (0.98–1.46 in). The upper mandibles of the males are very robust at the base, finely serrated and longer than the body itself. The eyes are small and the antennae have a whorl of hairs at the apex. The thorax is broad and the anterior and posterior margins are densely ciliated with short pale hairs. Elytrae are chestnut-brown, with slightly greenish iridescent tinges and finely granulated.

C. grantii is considered a rare and vulnerable species, with a risk of population declining. The adults of these beetles primarily feed on tree juices, while the larvae eat dead wood.

== Habitat ==
Chiasognathus grantii lives in temperate/subantarctic Nothofagus forests.
