= Nigidius =

Nigidius may refer to:

- Nigidius Figulus, a scholar of the Roman Republic
- Nigidius, a stag beetle genus
