= Hexarthrius melchioritis =

Scientific classification
- Kingdom: Animalia
- Phylum: Arthropoda
- Clade: Pancrustacea
- Class: Insecta
- Order: Coleoptera
- Suborder: Polyphaga
- Infraorder: Scarabaeiformia
- Family: Lucanidae
- Genus: Hexarthrius
- Species: H. melchioritis

Binomial name
- Hexarthrius melchioritis (Séguy, 1954)

Species of beetle

Hexarthrius melchioritis is a species of beetle, which belongs to the family of stag beetles (Lucanidae) in the group Scarabaeoidea.

It was first described in 1954 by French entomologist, Eugène Séguy. The species is endemic to northern Myanmar.

== Appearance ==
A large (males 35–71 millimeter), glossy, brown-black stag beetle. The male's jaws are long, quite straight, with an inward-facing tooth just outside the middle, with scattered, small teeth along the inner edge, pointed at the tip. This species is slimmer in build than most other Hexarthrius species. The antennae are quite thin, with a small, six-joint fan. The pronotum is rectangular, much wider than long. The female is completely black, much smaller than the male, with no strikingly enlarged jaws.

== Life cycle ==
The larvae develop in rotten tree trunks.

== Systematic classification ==
- Order Beetles, Coleoptera
  - Sub-order Polyphaga
    - Superfamily Scarabaeoidea
      - Family Stag beetles, Lucanidae Latreille, 1806
          - Tribe Lucanini Latreille, 1806
            - Genus Hexarthrius Hope, 1842 – 15 species
              - Hexarthrius melchioritis Seguy, 1954
