= Platyceroides agassii =

Scientific classification
- Domain: Eukaryota
- Kingdom: Animalia
- Phylum: Arthropoda
- Class: Insecta
- Order: Coleoptera
- Suborder: Polyphaga
- Infraorder: Scarabaeiformia
- Family: Lucanidae
- Genus: Platyceroides
- Species: P. agassii

Binomial name
- Platyceroides agassii (LeConte, 1861)

Synonyms
- Platycerus californicus Casey, 1885; Platycerus pacificus Casey, 1889; Platycerus parvicollis Casey, 1889; Platycerus pygmaeus Van Dyke, 1946

Species of beetle

Platyceroides agassii is a species of stag beetle in the family Lucanidae. It is found in North America.
