= Dinonigidius =

Scientific classification
- Domain: Eukaryota
- Kingdom: Animalia
- Phylum: Arthropoda
- Class: Insecta
- Order: Coleoptera
- Suborder: Polyphaga
- Infraorder: Scarabaeiformia
- Family: Lucanidae
- Subfamily: Lucaninae
- Tribe: Figulini
- Genus: Dinonigidius de Lisle, 1974

Genus of stag beetles

Dinonigidius is a genus of stag beetles in the family Lucanidae. There are at least two described species in Dinonigidius, found in India and Sri Lanka.

== Species ==
These two species belong to the genus Dinonigidius:

- Dinonigidius ahenobarbus de Lisle, 1974 (India, Sri Lanka)
- Dinonigidius bartolozzii Paulsen, 2016 (Sri Lanka)
