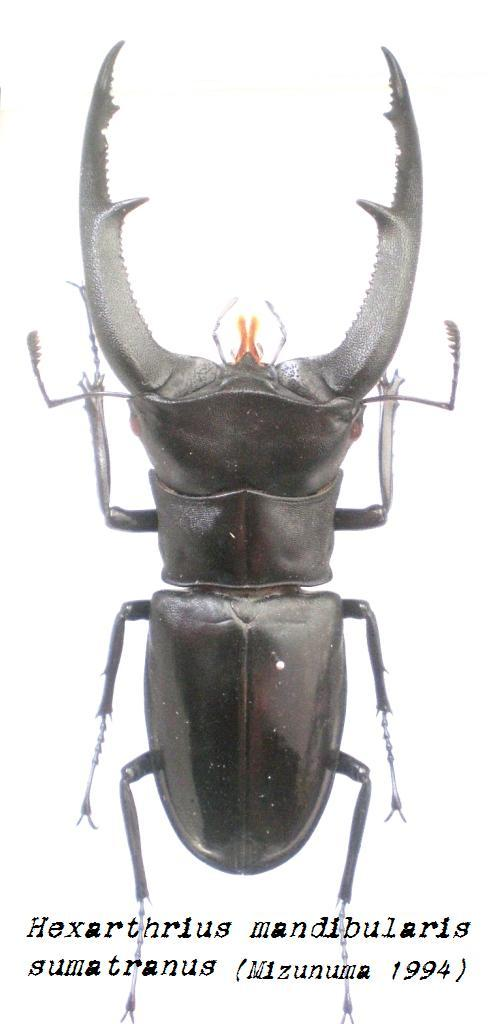
- Hexarthrius mandibularis sumatranus

Scientific classification
- Kingdom: Animalia
- Phylum: Arthropoda
- Clade: Pancrustacea
- Class: Insecta
- Order: Coleoptera
- Suborder: Polyphaga
- Infraorder: Scarabaeiformia
- Family: Lucanidae
- Genus: Hexarthrius
- Species: H. mandibularis

Binomial name
- Hexarthrius mandibularis Deyrolle, 1881

= Hexarthrius mandibularis =

Species of beetle

Hexarthrius mandibularis is one of the world's largest stag beetle. It belongs to the tribe Lucanini, in the family Lucanidae.

This beetle has a dull, dark, brick reddish body. Both the legs and antennae are blackish. The most notable characteristic are the large, antler-like mandibles. These have small teeth running down the inside edge, with one large, forward-pointing pair located approximately a third of the way down from the tips. The tips are forked inward somewhat.

During the larval stage, Hexarthrius mandibularis lives in rotten hardwood, feeding on it. Later, during the imago stage, it consumes tree juice.

== Subspecies ==
There are two subspecies, both native to Indonesia:

- Hexarthrius mandibularis mandibularis Deyrolle, 1881

This subspecies grows to a maximum length of 115 mm. It is indigenous to Kalimantan.

- Hexarthrius mandibularis sumatranus Mizunuma, 1994

This subspecies grows to a maximum length of 118.5 mm. It is indigenous to Sumatra.
