= Platyceroides viriditinctus =

Scientific classification
- Domain: Eukaryota
- Kingdom: Animalia
- Phylum: Arthropoda
- Class: Insecta
- Order: Coleoptera
- Suborder: Polyphaga
- Infraorder: Scarabaeiformia
- Family: Lucanidae
- Genus: Platyceroides
- Species: P. viriditinctus

Binomial name
- Platyceroides viriditinctus (Benesh, 1942)

Species of beetle

Platyceroides viriditinctus is a species of stag beetle in the family Lucanidae. It is found in North America.
