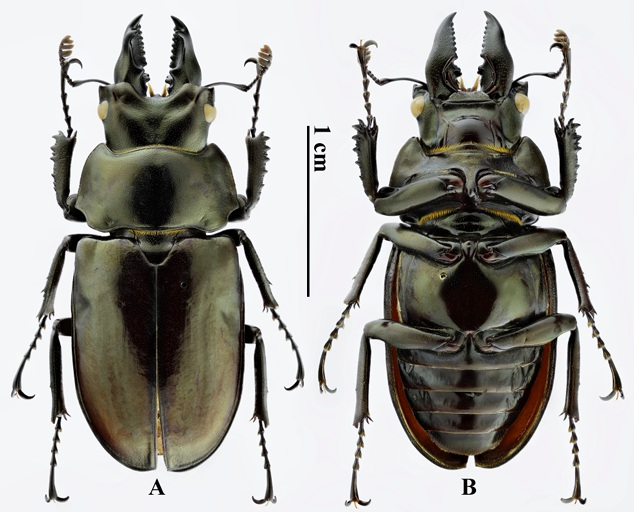

Scientific classification
- Domain: Eukaryota
- Kingdom: Animalia
- Phylum: Arthropoda
- Class: Insecta
- Order: Coleoptera
- Suborder: Polyphaga
- Infraorder: Scarabaeiformia
- Family: Lucanidae
- Genus: Prismognathus
- Species: P. helii

Binomial name
- Prismognathus helii Wang & He, 2024

= Prismognathus helii =

Species of beetle

Prismognathus helii is a species of beetle of the Lucanidae family. This species is found in China (Yunnan).

Adults reach a length of about 26.8 mm, and are almost entirely blackish brown with a moderately lustrous and glabrous body.

== Etymology ==
The species is dedicated to Mr. Li He (Chengdu, China), an enthusiastic amateur entomologist.
