= Platyceroides opacus =

Scientific classification
- Kingdom: Animalia
- Phylum: Arthropoda
- Class: Insecta
- Order: Coleoptera
- Suborder: Polyphaga
- Infraorder: Scarabaeiformia
- Family: Lucanidae
- Genus: Platyceroides
- Species: P. opacus

Binomial name
- Platyceroides opacus (Fall, 1906)

Species of beetle

Platyceroides opacus is a species of stag beetle in the family Lucanidae. It is found in North America.
