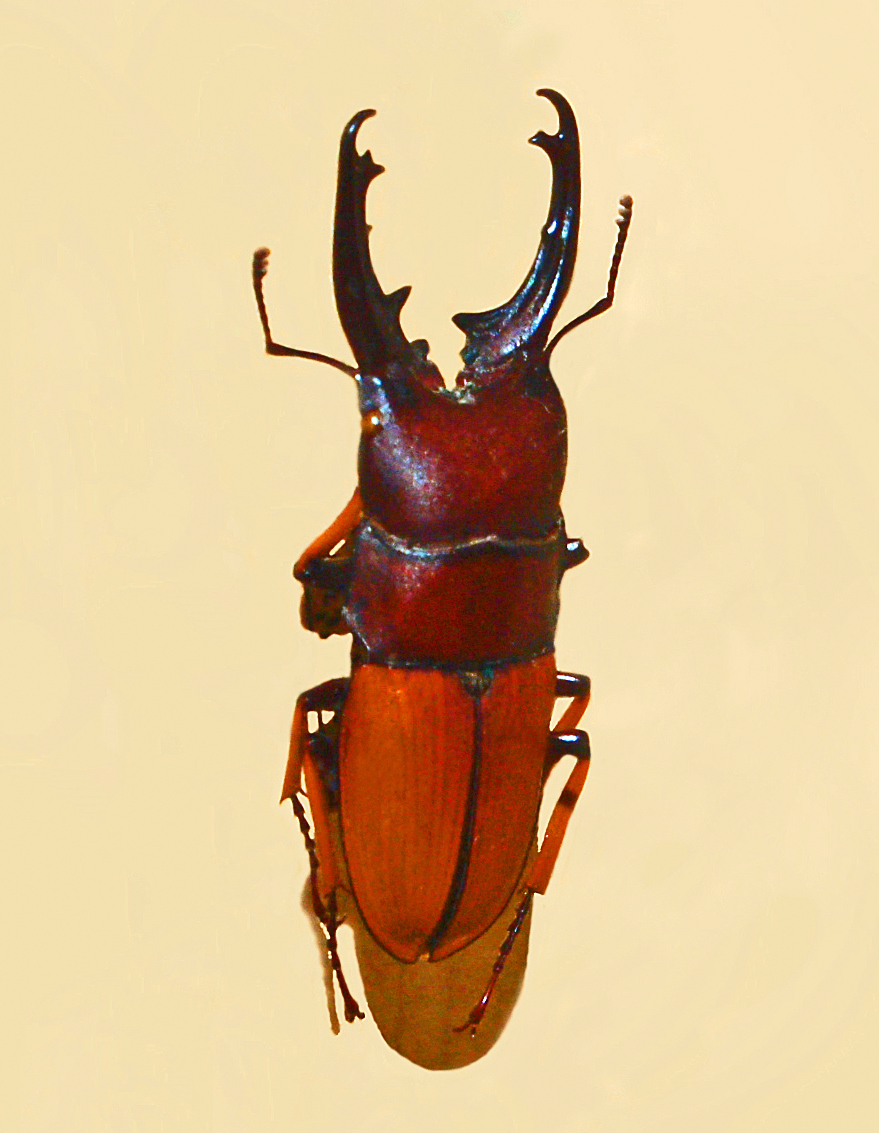
- Leptinopterus tibialis from Brazil. Male

Scientific classification
- Kingdom: Animalia
- Phylum: Arthropoda
- Clade: Pancrustacea
- Class: Insecta
- Order: Coleoptera
- Suborder: Polyphaga
- Infraorder: Scarabaeiformia
- Family: Lucanidae
- Genus: Leptinopterus
- Species: L. tibialis

Binomial name
- Leptinopterus tibialis (Eschscholtz, 1822)

Synonyms
- Leptinopterus bucki Lüderwaldt, 1935; Lucanus ochraceus Hope MS in Gemminger & Harold, 1868; Lucanus ochropterus Hope MS in Gemminger & Harold, 1868; Lucanus tibialis Eschscholtz, 1822; Lucanus tibialis ab. castaneus Lüderwaldt, 1930; Lucanus tibialis ab. fulvus Lüderwaldt, 1930

= Leptinopterus tibialis =

Species of beetle

Leptinopterus tibialis is a species of beetles belonging to the family Lucanidae.

== Description ==
Leptinopterus tibialis can reach a length of about 14–38 millimetres (0.55–1.50 in) in the males, about 15–18 millimetres (0.59–0.71 in) in the females. Males have well-developed mandibles, with several teeth of various sizes in the interior edges.

== Distribution ==
This quite rare species occurs in Argentina, Brazil and Paraguay.
