= Platyceroides =

Scientific classification
- Domain: Eukaryota
- Kingdom: Animalia
- Phylum: Arthropoda
- Class: Insecta
- Order: Coleoptera
- Suborder: Polyphaga
- Infraorder: Scarabaeiformia
- Family: Lucanidae
- Tribe: Platyceroidini
- Genus: Platyceroides; Benesh, 1946

Genus of beetles

Platyceroides is a genus of stag beetles in the family Lucanidae. There are about 16 described species in Platyceroides.

== Species ==
These 16 species belong to the genus Platyceroides:

- Platyceroides aeneus (Van Dyke, 1928)
- Platyceroides agassii (LeConte, 1861)
- Platyceroides barrae Paulsen, 2017
- Platyceroides californicus (Casey, 1885)
- Platyceroides infernus Paulsen, 2017
- Platyceroides keeni (Casey, 1895)
- Platyceroides laticollis (Casey, 1914)
- Platyceroides latus (Fall, 1901)
- Platyceroides marshalli Paulsen, 2015
- Platyceroides opacus (Fall, 1906)
- Platyceroides pacificus (Casey, 1889)
- Platyceroides pampinatus Paulsen, 2017
- Platyceroides potax Paulsen, 2014
- Platyceroides thoracicus (Casey, 1895)
- Platyceroides umpquus Paulsen, 2017
- Platyceroides viriditinctus (Benesh, 1942)
