= Arnaudius =

- Arnaudius monnei

Scientific classification
- Kingdom: Animalia
- Phylum: Arthropoda
- Clade: Pancrustacea
- Class: Insecta
- Order: Coleoptera
- Suborder: Polyphaga
- Infraorder: Scarabaeiformia
- Family: Lucanidae
- Subfamily: Lucaninae
- Tribe: Sclerostomini
- Genus: Arnaudius; Grossi & Bartolozzi, 2011

Genus of beetles

Arnaudius is a genus of beetles of the family Lucanidae.

== Species ==
- Arnaudius bomansi Grossi & Bartolozzi, 2011
- Arnaudius digennaroi (Arnaud, Noguchi & Bomans, 2008)
- Arnaudius koikei (Arnaud, Noguchi & Bomans, 2007)
- Arnaudius monnei Soares & Grossi, 2026

== Taxonomy ==
Grossi & Bartolozzi described the Peruvian stag beetle genus Arnaudius in 2011, proposing new combinations for three species that were previously classified within Sclerostomus and Metadorcinus. These species share similarities in the combination of morphological characters, with the shape of the male genital capsule being the most important character diagnosing the genus.
