= Platyceroides laticollis =

Scientific classification
- Kingdom: Animalia
- Phylum: Arthropoda
- Clade: Pancrustacea
- Class: Insecta
- Order: Coleoptera
- Suborder: Polyphaga
- Infraorder: Scarabaeiformia
- Family: Lucanidae
- Genus: Platyceroides
- Species: P. laticollis

Binomial name
- Platyceroides laticollis (Casey, 1914)

Species of beetle

Platyceroides laticollis is a species of stag beetle in the family Lucanidae. It is found in North America.
