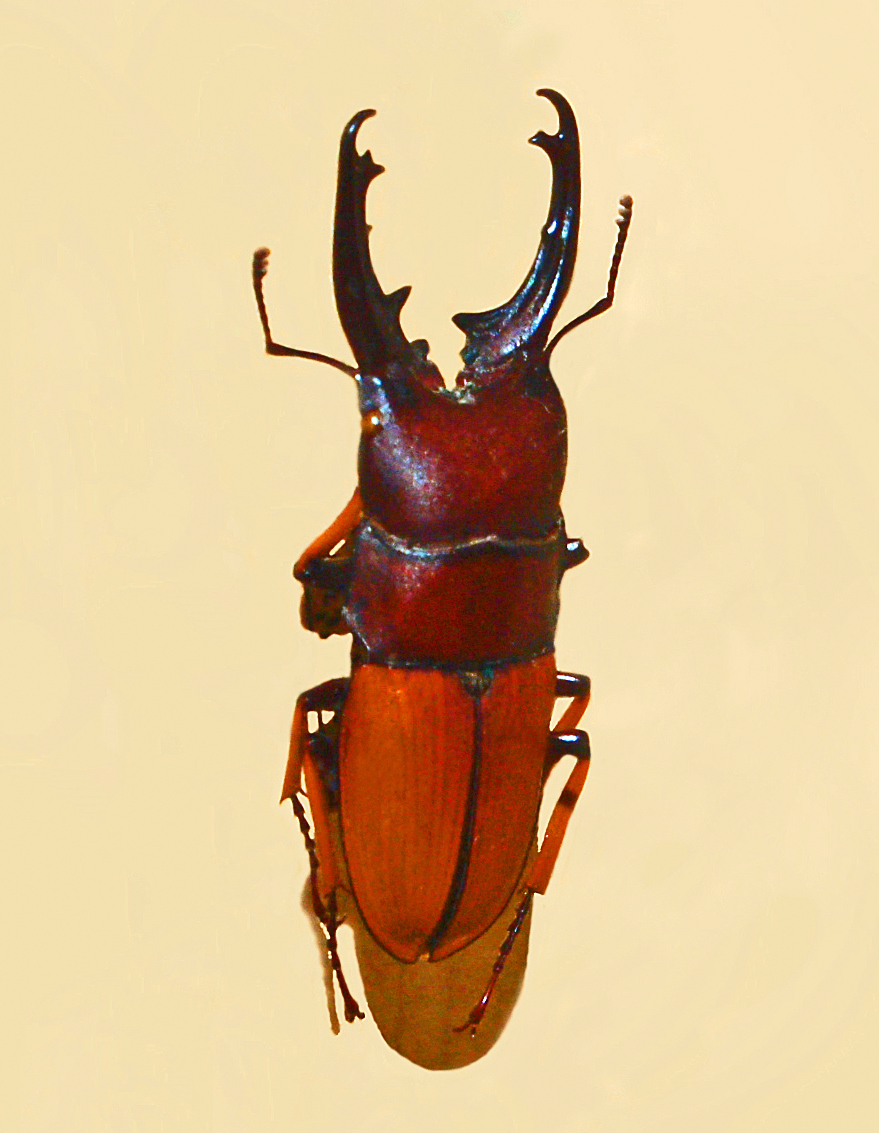
- Male Leptinopterus tibialis, Brazil

Scientific classification
- Domain: Eukaryota
- Kingdom: Animalia
- Phylum: Arthropoda
- Class: Insecta
- Order: Coleoptera
- Suborder: Polyphaga
- Infraorder: Scarabaeiformia
- Family: Lucanidae
- Subfamily: Lucaninae
- Tribe: Sclerostomini
- Genus: Leptinopterus; Hope, 1838

Synonyms
- Leptynopterus Hope, 1838; Psalicerus Dejean, 1836; Psalidostomus Burmeister, 1847; Psalipocerus Agassiz, 1846; Psallicerus Gistl, 1848

= Leptinopterus =

Genus of beetles

Leptinopterus is a genus of stag beetles in the family Lucanidae. There are more than 30 described species in Leptinopterus, found in South America.

== Species ==
These 32 species belong to the genus Leptinopterus:

- Leptinopterus affinis Parry, 1872 (Brazil)
- Leptinopterus asketus Grossi, 2009 (Brazil)
- Leptinopterus assimilis Grossi, 2009 (Brazil)
- Leptinopterus atramentarius Nagel, 1928 (Brazil)
- Leptinopterus bicolor Luederwaldt, 1931 (Brazil)
- Leptinopterus burmeisteri Arrow, 1943 (Brazil)
- Leptinopterus caledoniaensis (Grossi, Racca-Filho & Vaz-de-Mello, 2003) (Brazil)
- Leptinopterus consimilis Möllenkamp, 1901 (Brazil)
- Leptinopterus constricticollis Heller, 1924 (Brazil)
- Leptinopterus elegans Jakovlev, 1900 (Brazil)
- Leptinopterus erythrocnemus (Burmeister, 1847) (Argentina, Brazil)
- Leptinopterus femoratus (Olivier, 1789) (Argentina, Brazil, French Guiana)
- Leptinopterus fraternus Westwood, 1874 (Brazil)
- Leptinopterus fryi (Parry, 1862) (Brazil)
- Leptinopterus gracilipes Didier, 1928 (Brazil)
- Leptinopterus gracilis Boileau, 1899 (Brazil)
- Leptinopterus ibex (Billberg, 1820) (Brazil, French Guiana)
- Leptinopterus inaharai Lacroix, 1982 (Brazil)
- Leptinopterus mazama Kriesche, 1926 (Brazil)
- Leptinopterus melanarius (Hope, 1845) (Brazil)
- Leptinopterus nigrotibialis Luederwaldt, 1935 (Brazil)
- Leptinopterus nitidus Luederwaldt, 1930 (Brazil)
- Leptinopterus paranensis Parry, 1872 (Argentina, Brazil)
- Leptinopterus pellitomarginatus Luederwaldt, 1930 (Brazil)
- Leptinopterus puncticollis Luederwaldt, 1930 (Brazil)
- Leptinopterus robustus Luederwaldt, 1930 (Brazil)
- Leptinopterus spitzi (Ohaus, 1929) (Brazil)
- Leptinopterus suturalis Luederwaldt, 1930 (Brazil)
- Leptinopterus tibialis (Eschscholtz, 1822) (Argentina, Brazil, Paraguay)
- Leptinopterus v-nigrum (Hope, 1845) (Brazil)
- Leptinopterus vestitus Benesh, 1937 (Brazil)
- Leptinopterus ypirangensis Luederwaldt, 1930 (Brazil)
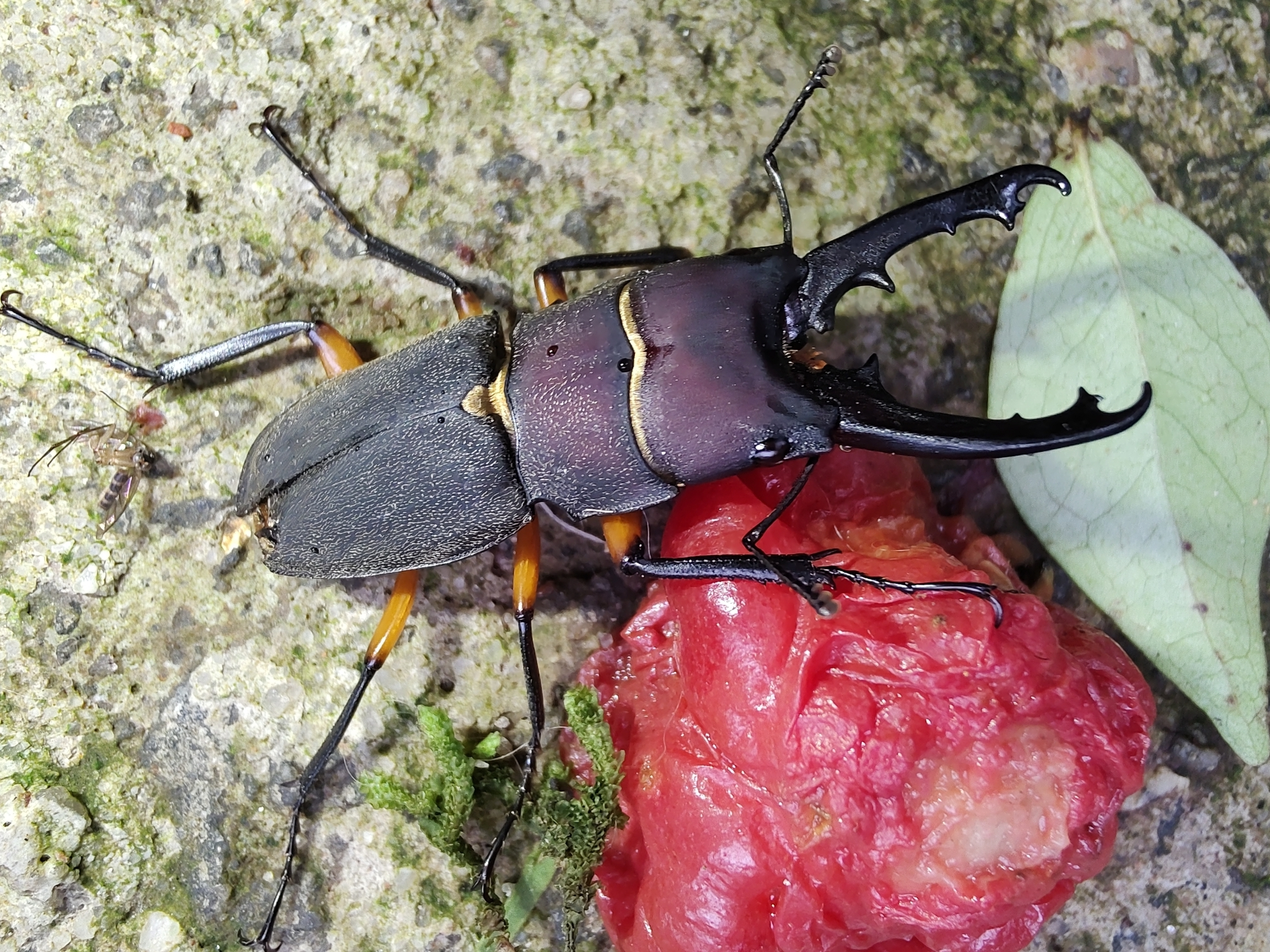
Leptinopterus femoratus, Brazil

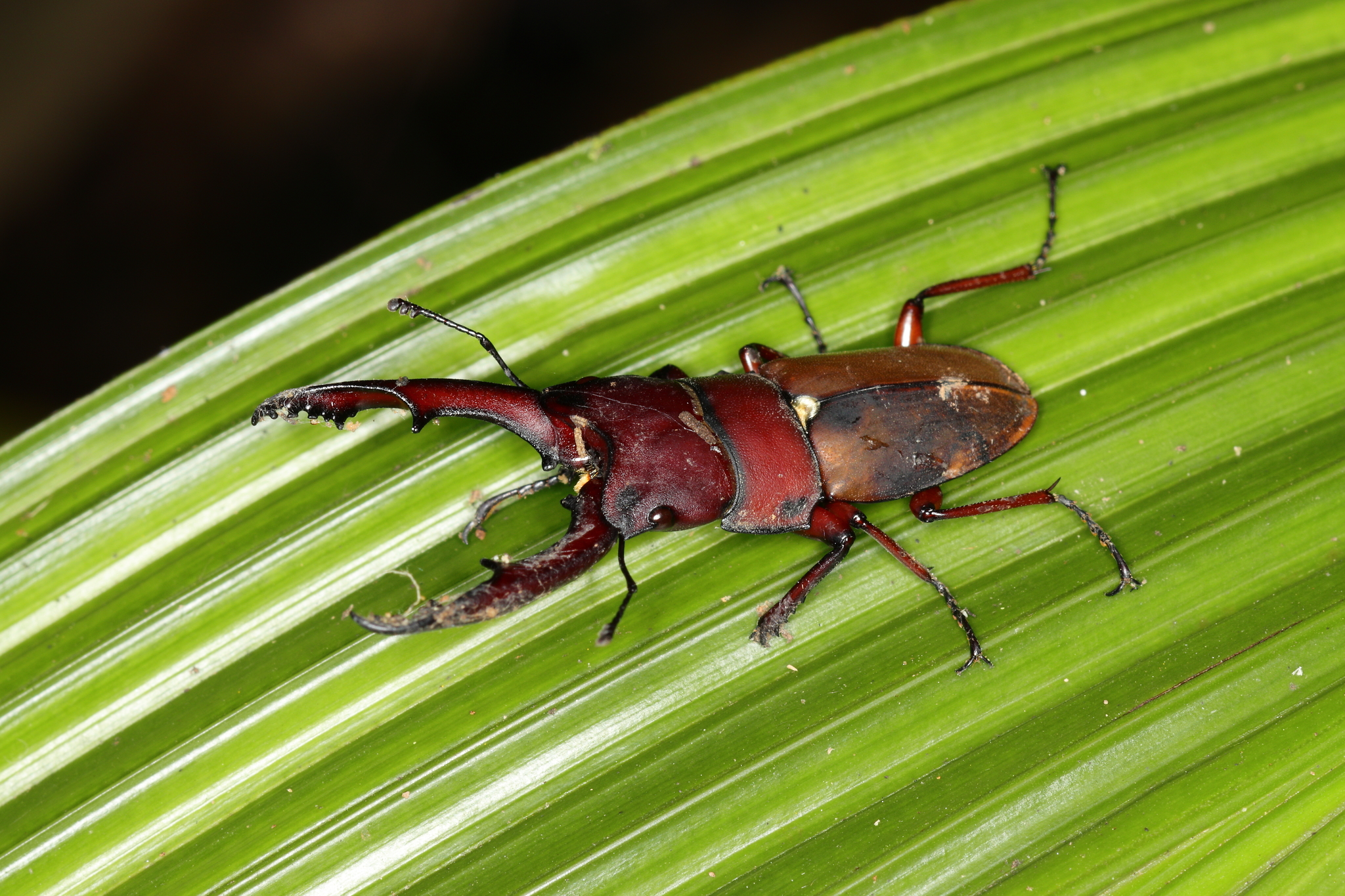
Leptinopterus burmeisteri, Brazil

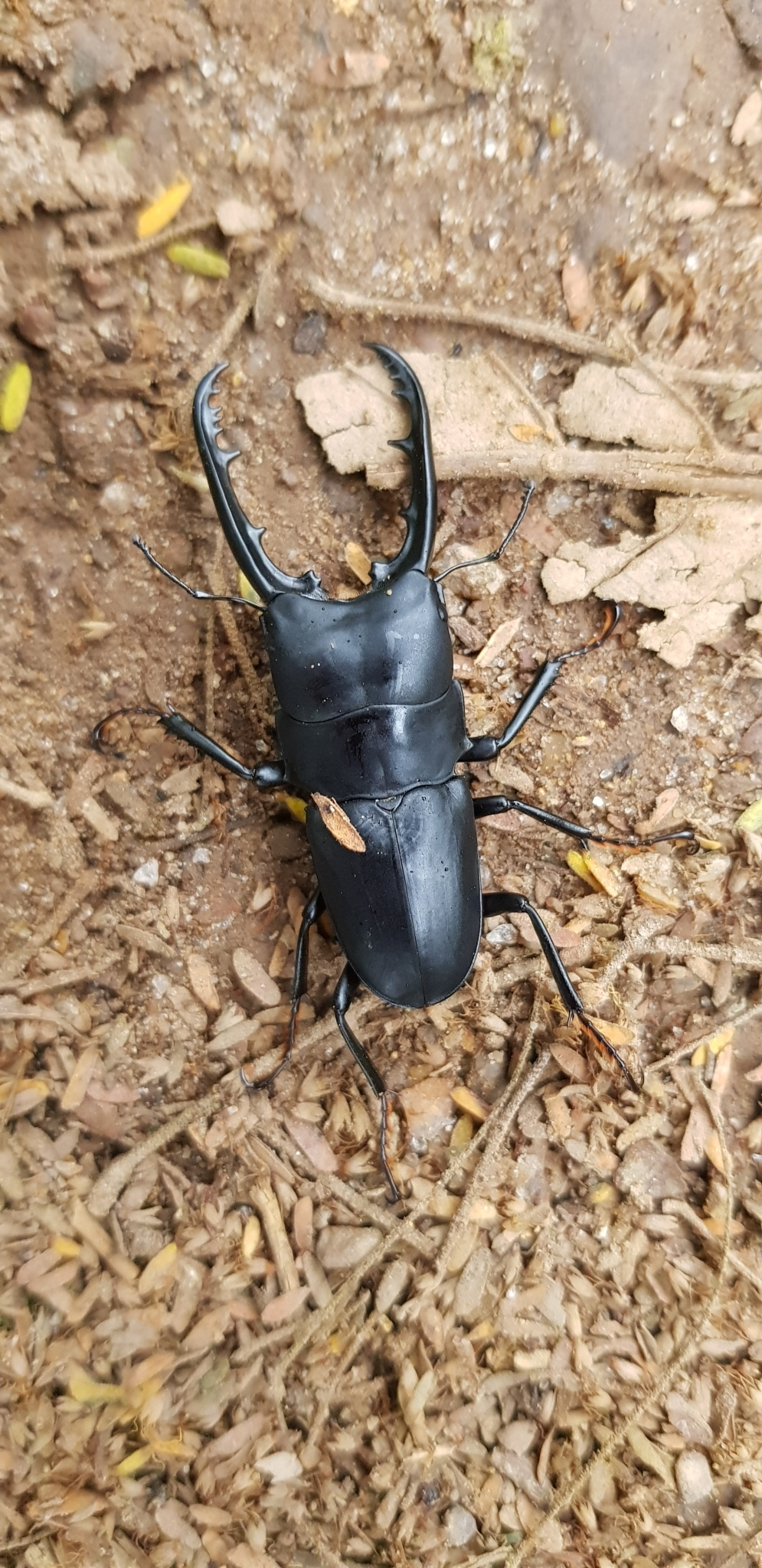
Leptinopterus paranensis, Brazil

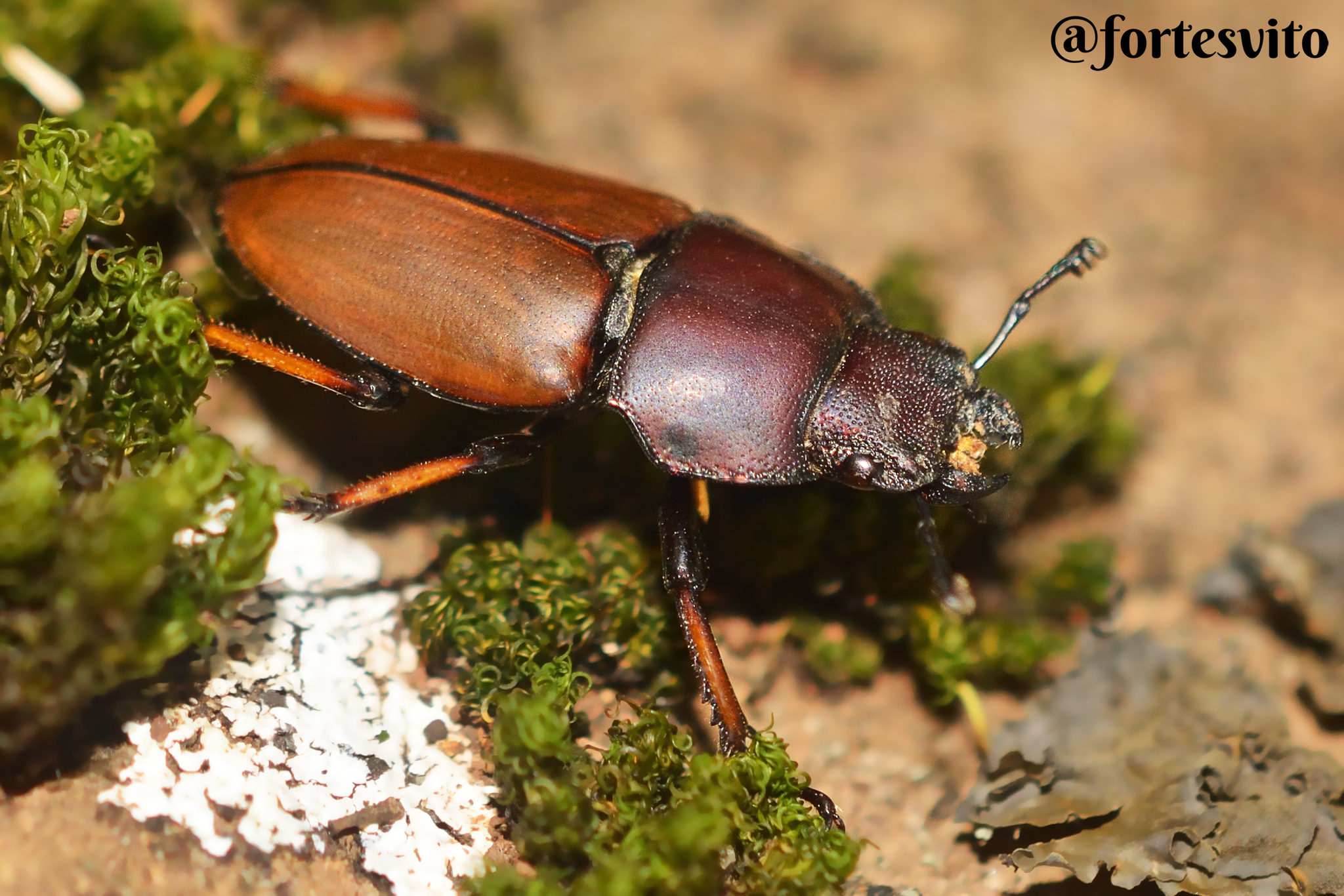
Leptinopterus tibialis, Brazil
