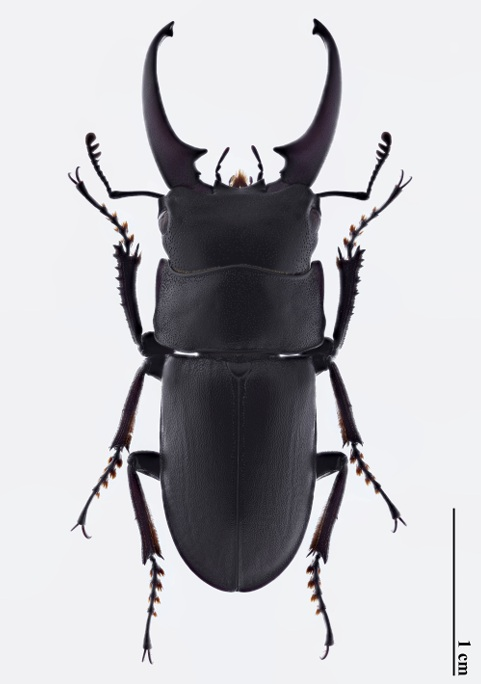

Scientific classification
- Domain: Eukaryota
- Kingdom: Animalia
- Phylum: Arthropoda
- Class: Insecta
- Order: Coleoptera
- Suborder: Polyphaga
- Infraorder: Scarabaeiformia
- Family: Lucanidae
- Genus: Falcicornis
- Species: F. wangjini

Binomial name
- Falcicornis wangjini Wang & He, 2024

= Falcicornis wangjini =

Species of beetle

Falcicornis wangjini is a species of beetle of the Lucanidae family. This species is found in Vietnam.

Adults are relatively large for the genus, reaching a length of about 34.2 mm long. They are entirely brownish black. the body generally lustreless and glabrous. There are some yellowish hairs on the mouthparts, anterior and posterior margins of the pronotum, the legs and the posterior part of abdominal sternite.

== Etymology ==
The species is dedicated to Mr. Jin Wang (Chengdu, China), an enthusiastic amateur entomologist.
