= Arnaudius monnei =

Scientific classification
- Kingdom: Animalia
- Phylum: Arthropoda
- Clade: Pancrustacea
- Class: Insecta
- Order: Coleoptera
- Suborder: Polyphaga
- Infraorder: Scarabaeiformia
- Family: Lucanidae
- Genus: Arnaudius
- Species: A. monnei

Binomial name
- Arnaudius monnei Soares & Grossi, 2026

Species of beetle

Arnaudius monnei is a species of beetle of the family Lucanidae. It is found in Peru.

== Description ==
Adults reach a length of about 11.3–15.1 mm (0.44–0.59 in). The dorsal surface is matte, coppery brown with small black spots, while the underside is entirely dark brown.

== Etymology ==
The species is named in honour of Dr. Miguel Ángel Monné.
