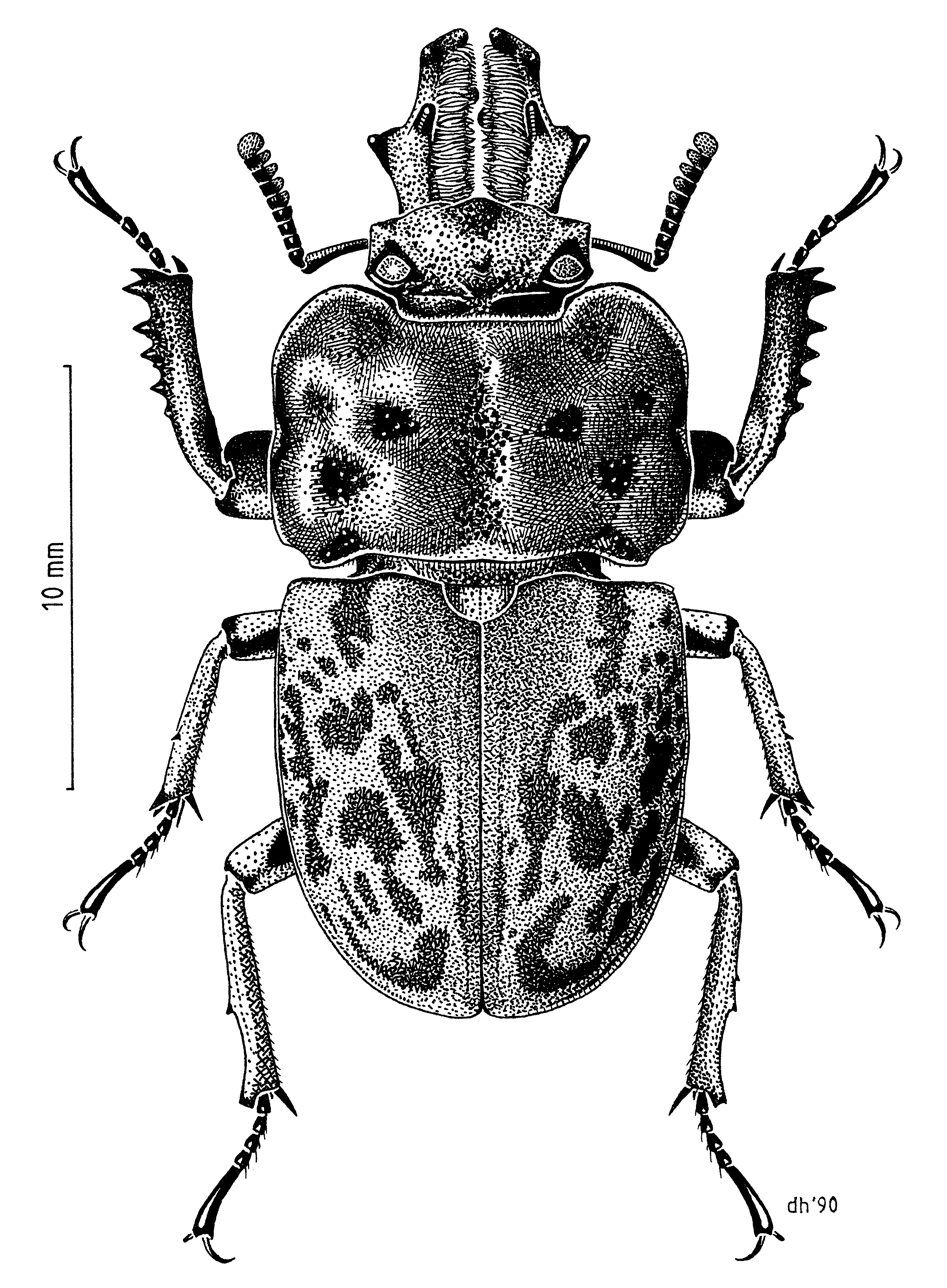
- Ryssonotus nebulosus illustrated by Des Helmore

Scientific classification
- Kingdom: Animalia
- Phylum: Arthropoda
- Clade: Pancrustacea
- Class: Insecta
- Order: Coleoptera
- Suborder: Polyphaga
- Infraorder: Scarabaeiformia
- Family: Lucanidae
- Subfamily: Lucaninae
- Tribe: Ryssonotini
- Genus: Ryssonotus; Macleay, 1819
- Species: R. nebulosus

Binomial name
- Ryssonotus nebulosus (Kirby, 1818)

Synonyms
- Lucanus nebulosus Kirby, 1818; Rhyssonotus Auctt. (misspelling)

= Ryssonotus =

Species of beetle

Ryssonotus nebulosus is a beetle of the family Lucanidae, and the sole member of the genus Ryssonotus (often misspelled as "Rhyssonotus"). It is found in Queensland and New South Wales, Australia, as well as introduced into New Zealand.

== Gallery ==
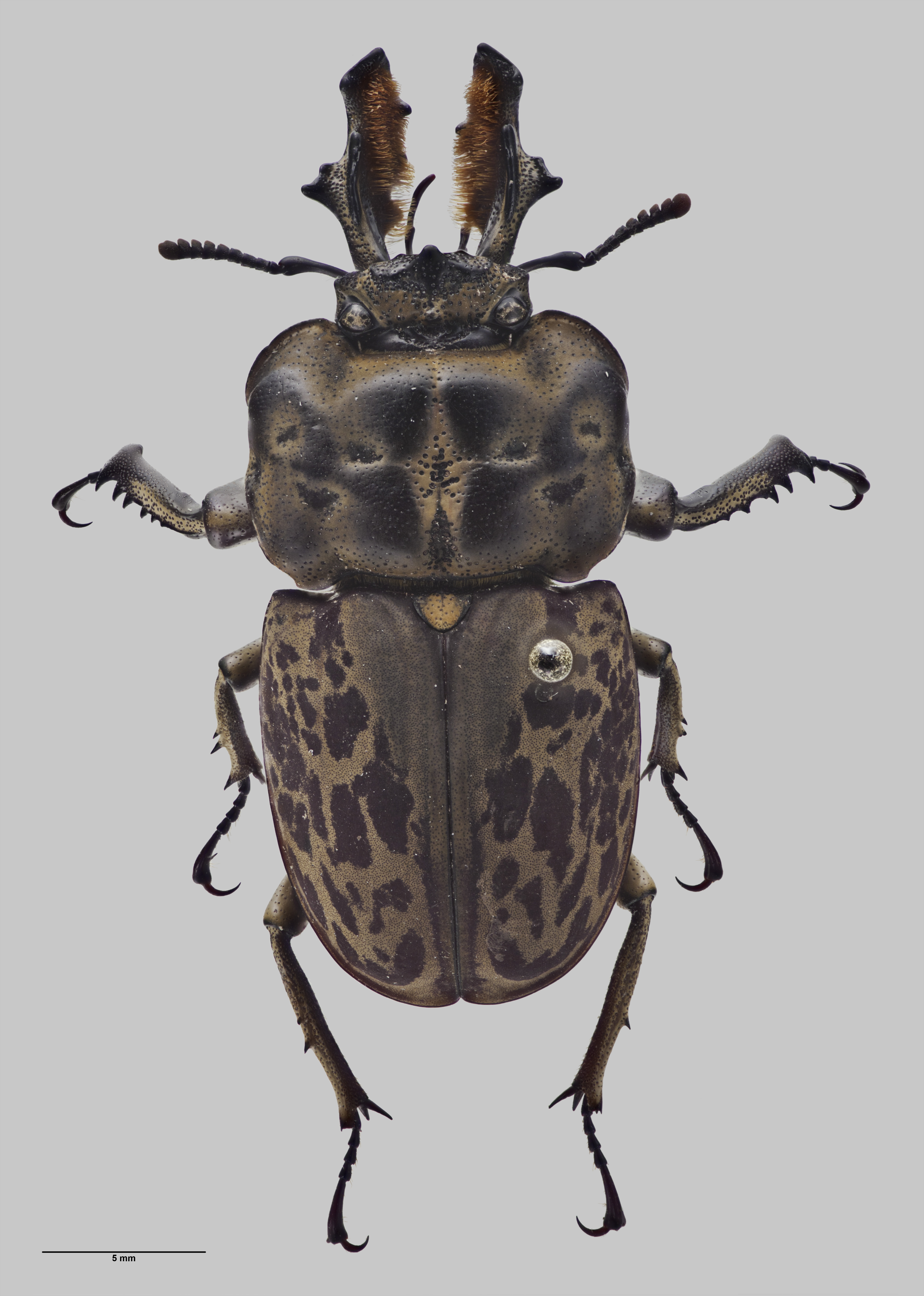

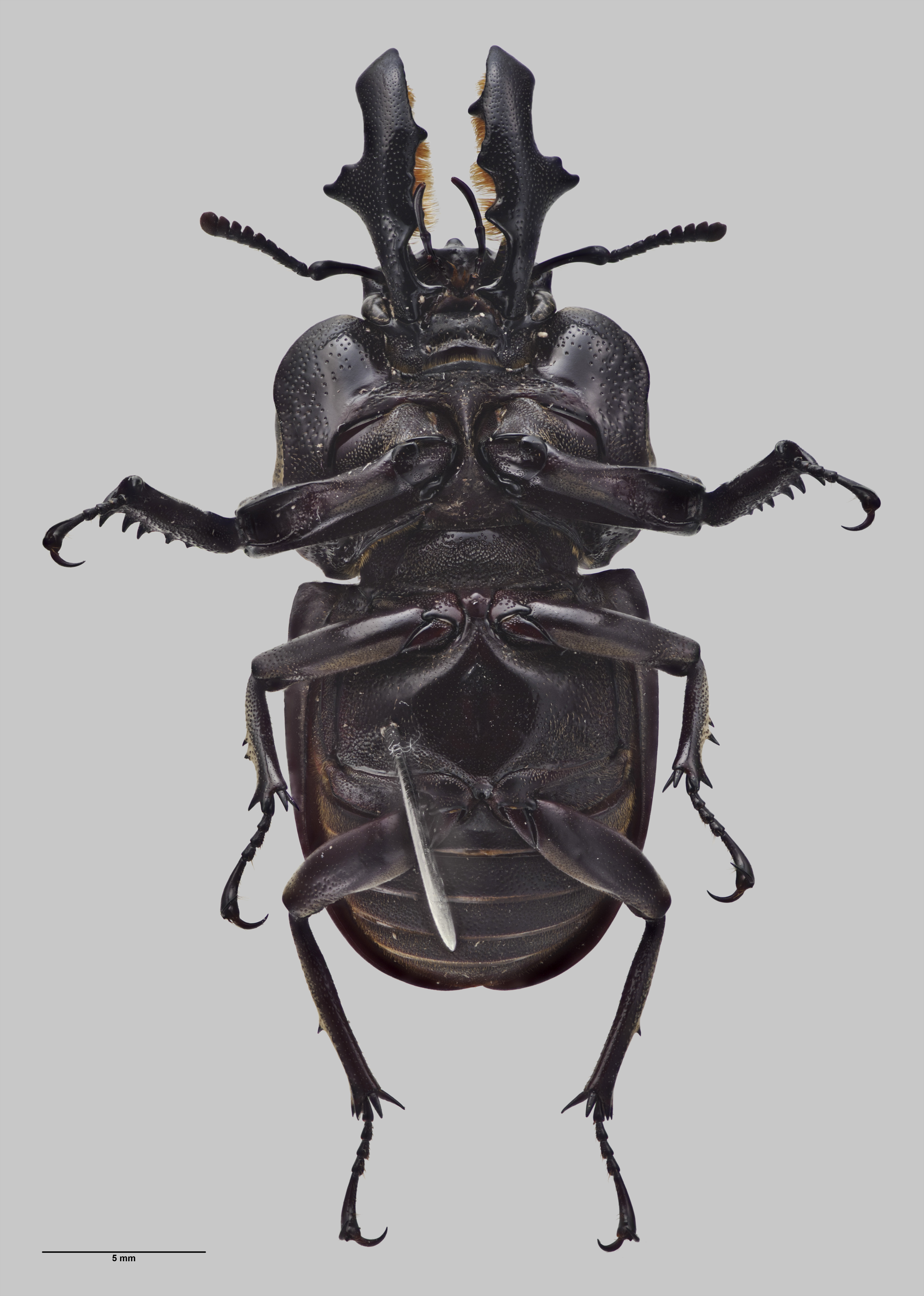
