= Platyceroides thoracicus =

Scientific classification
- Kingdom: Animalia
- Phylum: Arthropoda
- Class: Insecta
- Order: Coleoptera
- Suborder: Polyphaga
- Infraorder: Scarabaeiformia
- Family: Lucanidae
- Genus: Platyceroides
- Species: P. thoracicus

Binomial name
- Platyceroides thoracicus (Casey, 1895)

Species of beetle

Platyceroides thoracicus is a species of stag beetle in the family Lucanidae. It is found in North America.The scientific name of the species was first validly published in 1895 by Casey.
