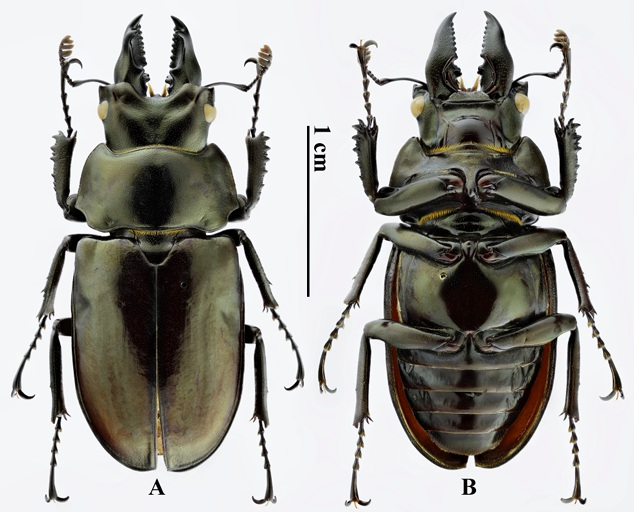
- Prismognathus helii

Scientific classification
- Kingdom: Animalia
- Phylum: Arthropoda
- Clade: Pancrustacea
- Class: Insecta
- Order: Coleoptera
- Suborder: Polyphaga
- Infraorder: Scarabaeiformia
- Family: Lucanidae
- Subfamily: Lucaninae
- Genus: Prismognathus; Motschulsky, 1860

Synonyms
- Eligmodontus Houlbert, 1915; Gonometopus Houlbert, 1915

= Prismognathus =

Genus of beetles

Prismognathus is a genus of beetles of the family Lucanidae.

== Species ==
- Prismognathus alessandrae Bartolozzi, 2003
- Prismognathus angularis Waterhouse, 1874
- Prismognathus arcuatus (Houlbert, 1915)
- Prismognathus bousqueti (Boucher, 1996)
- Prismognathus castaneus (Didier, 1926)
- Prismognathus dauricus (Motschulsky, 1860)
- Prismognathus davidis Deyrolle, 1878
- Prismognathus delislei Endrödi, 1971
- Prismognathus formosanus Nagel, 1928
- Prismognathus haojiani Huang & Chen, 2012
- Prismognathus helii Wang & He, 2024
- Prismognathus kanghianus (Didier & Séguy, 1953)
- Prismognathus katsurai Ikeda, 1997
- Prismognathus klapperichi Bomans, 1989
- Prismognathus kucerai Baba, 2004
- Prismognathus kurosawai Fujita & Ichikawa, 1986
- Prismognathus lucidus Boileau, 1904
- Prismognathus mekolaorum Okuda & Maeda, 2015
- Prismognathus mixtus Huang & Chen, 2017
- Prismognathus miyashitai Ikeda, 1997
- Prismognathus nigricolor Boucher, 1996
- Prismognathus nobuhikoi (Ikeda, 2000)
- Prismognathus nosei Nagai, 2000
- Prismognathus oberthuri (Houlbert, 1912)
- Prismognathus parvus Didier, 1928
- Prismognathus passangi Okuda & Maeda, 2015
- Prismognathus platycephalus (Hope, 1842)
- Prismognathus prossi Bartolozzi & Wan, 2006
- Prismognathus ruficephalus Lacroix, 1978
- Prismognathus shani Huang & Chen, 2012
- Prismognathus sinensis Bomans, 1989
- Prismognathus siniaevi Ikeda, 1997
- Prismognathus subnitens (Parry, 1862)
- Prismognathus sukkitorum Nagai, 2005
- Prismognathus transiens Huang, Chen, Tao & Xiao, 2020
- Prismognathus triapicalis (Houlbert, 1915)
- Prismognathus yukinobui Nagai, 2005
- Prismognathus yutangi Huang & Chen, 2018
- Prismognathus zhangi Huang & Chen, 2013
- Prismognathus zhihongi Wang & Huang, 2025
