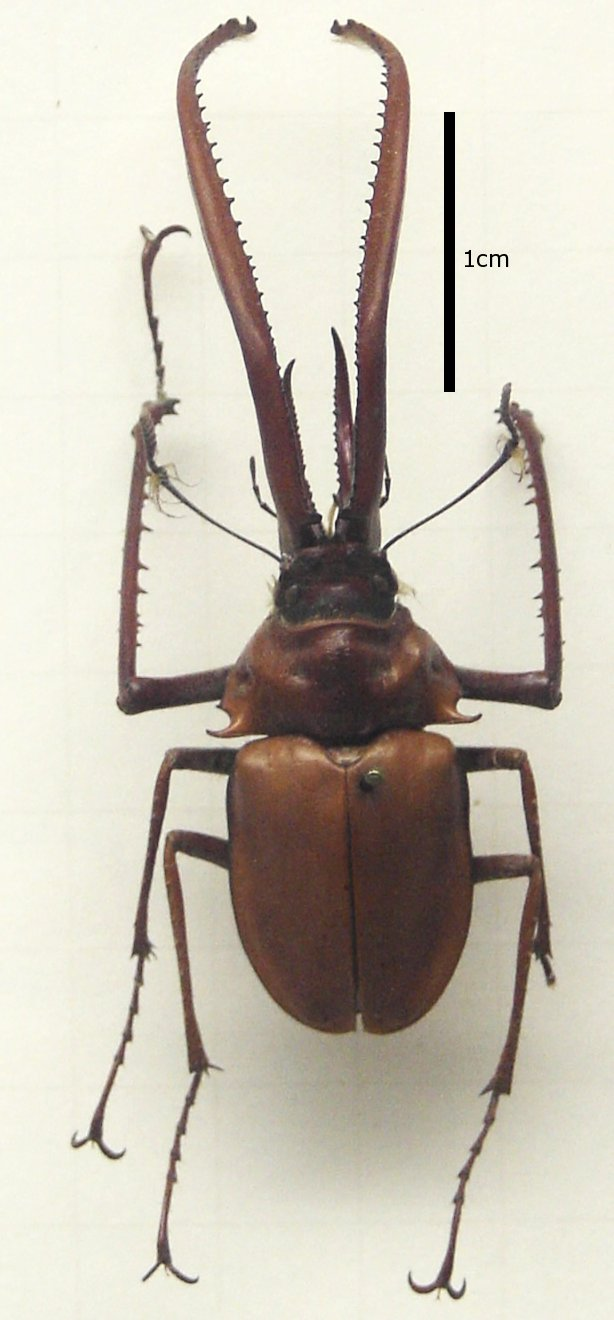
- Chiasognathus grantii, Darwin's beetle or Grant's stag beetle

Scientific classification
- Kingdom: Animalia
- Phylum: Arthropoda
- Clade: Pancrustacea
- Class: Insecta
- Order: Coleoptera
- Suborder: Polyphaga
- Infraorder: Scarabaeiformia
- Family: Lucanidae
- Tribe: Chiasognathini
- Genus: Chiasognathus; Stephens, 1831

= Chiasognathus =

Genus of beetles

Chiasognathus is a genus of stag beetles found in Argentina and Chile. It includes seven species:

- Chiasognathus beneshi Lacroix, 1978
- Chiasognathus grantii Stephens, 1832
- Chiasognathus impubis Parry, 1870
- Chiasognathus jousselinii Reiche, 1850
- Chiasognathus latreillei Solier, 1851
- Chiasognathus mniszechii Thomson, 1862
- Chiasognathus sombrus Paulsen & Smith, 2010
