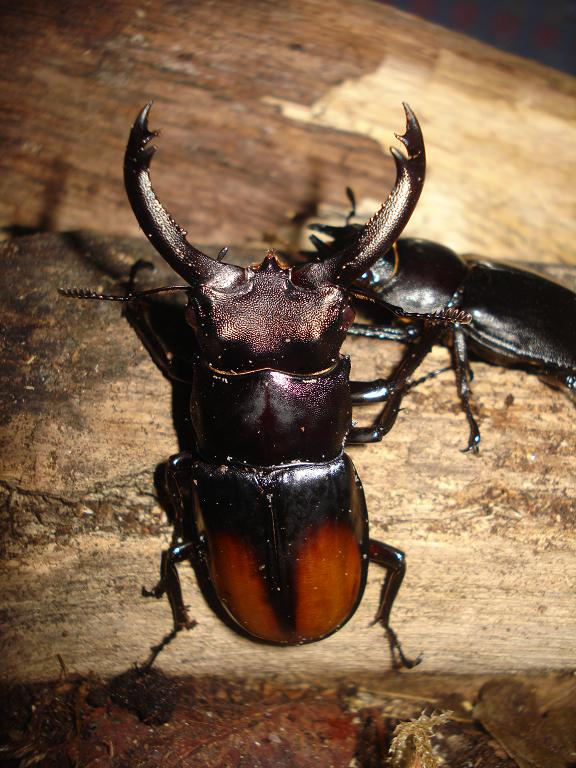
- Male (foreground) and female Hexarthrius parryi. The male is 70 mm (2.8 in) long.

Scientific classification
- Kingdom: Animalia
- Phylum: Arthropoda
- Clade: Pancrustacea
- Class: Insecta
- Order: Coleoptera
- Suborder: Polyphaga
- Infraorder: Scarabaeiformia
- Family: Lucanidae
- Genus: Hexarthrius
- Species: H. parryi

Binomial name
- Hexarthrius parryi Hope, 1842

Subspecies
- See text

= Hexarthrius parryi =

Species of beetle

Hexarthrius parryi, the fighting giant stag beetle, is a species of large stag beetles. It belongs to the genus Hexarthrius of the tribe Lucanini. It is classified under the subfamily Lucaninae of the stag beetle family Lucanidae.

== Subspecies ==
The species is divided into the following subspecies:

- Hexarthrius parryi deyrollei Parry, 1864 (Malaysia, Myanmar, Thailand)
- Hexarthrius parryi elongatus Jordan, 1894 (Malaysia)
- Hexarthrius parryi paradoxus Mollenkamp, 1898 (Java, Sumatra)
- Hexarthrius parryi parryi Hope, 1842 (Bangladesh, Cambodia, India, Laos, Myanmar, Thailand, Vietnam)

== Description ==
Hexarthrius parryi can reach a length of about 40–90 millimetres (1.6–3.5 in) in males, of about 40–54 millimetres (1.6–2.1 in) in females (length from the tip of the jaw to wing tip). Some individuals of the Sumatra subspecies (Hexarthrius parryi paradoxus) can reach a length of about 97 millimetres (3.8 in). Body is moderately elongate, not very shining, the basic color is black. Males have long jaws directed downward from the base, with bifurcated tips and a large yellow or bright orange patch occupying the posterior three-quarters of each elytron. The pronotum is short. The lateral angle of the prothorax is very sharp. The head is very broad, quite uneven and rugosely punctured. The mandibles are strongly curved, densely granular, with a sharp tooth directed upwards and another one directed downwards. The front tibia is finely serrated and the middle tibia has a strong lateral spine. The forewing shows a pair of brown spots.

== Life cycle ==
Eggs are laid into rotten wood, sometimes into tunnels made by the females. Larvae feed on rotten wood. They become a pupa in the about 6–9 months. Adults emerge in about one month after pupation. Life of adults last about 6–8 months. They feed on sap and fruits.

== Distribution ==
This species is present in the forests of Bangladesh, Southeast Asia, Indonesia and India.

== Gallery ==
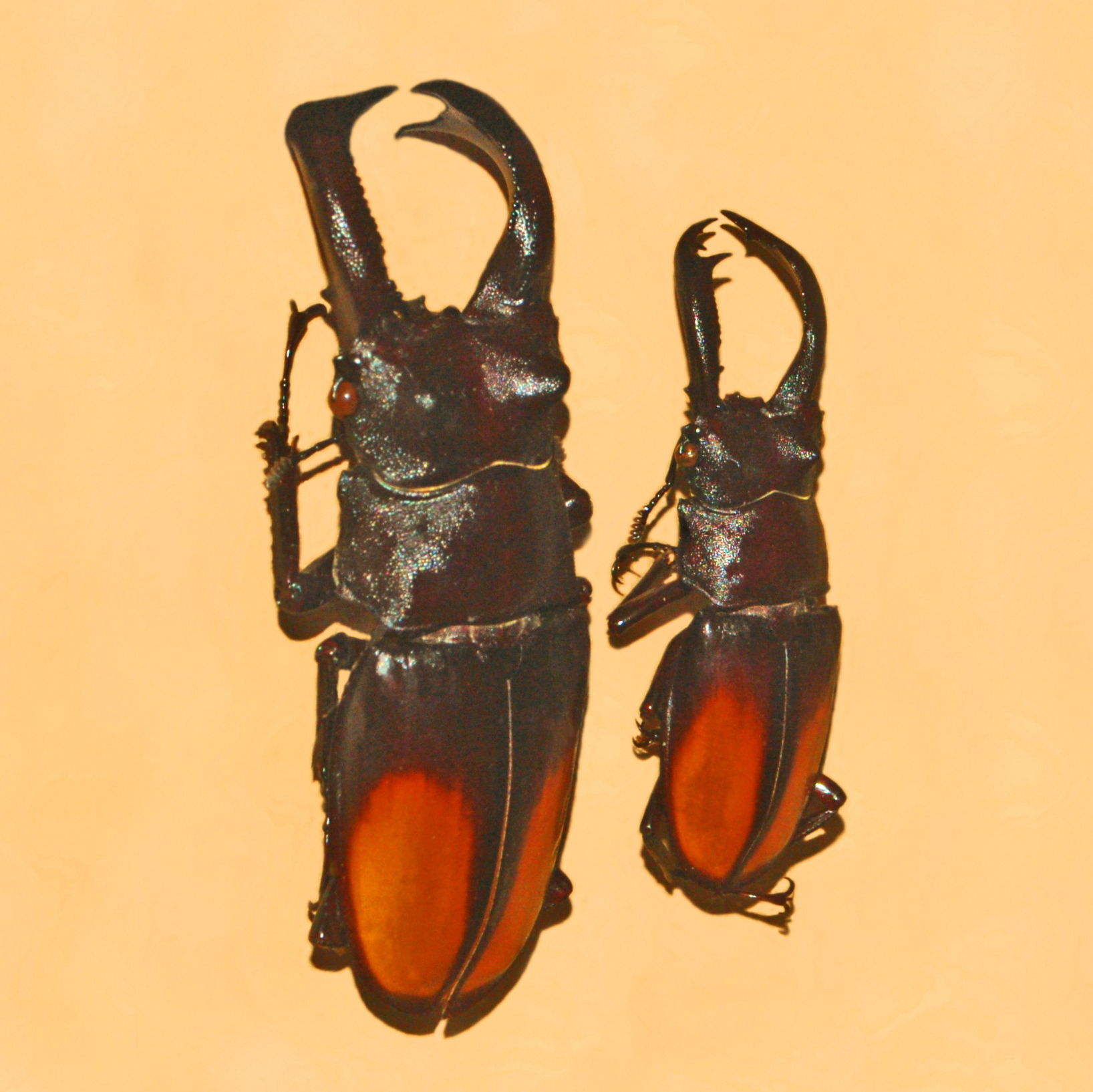
Hexarthrius parryi paradoxus from Sumatra. Museum specimen

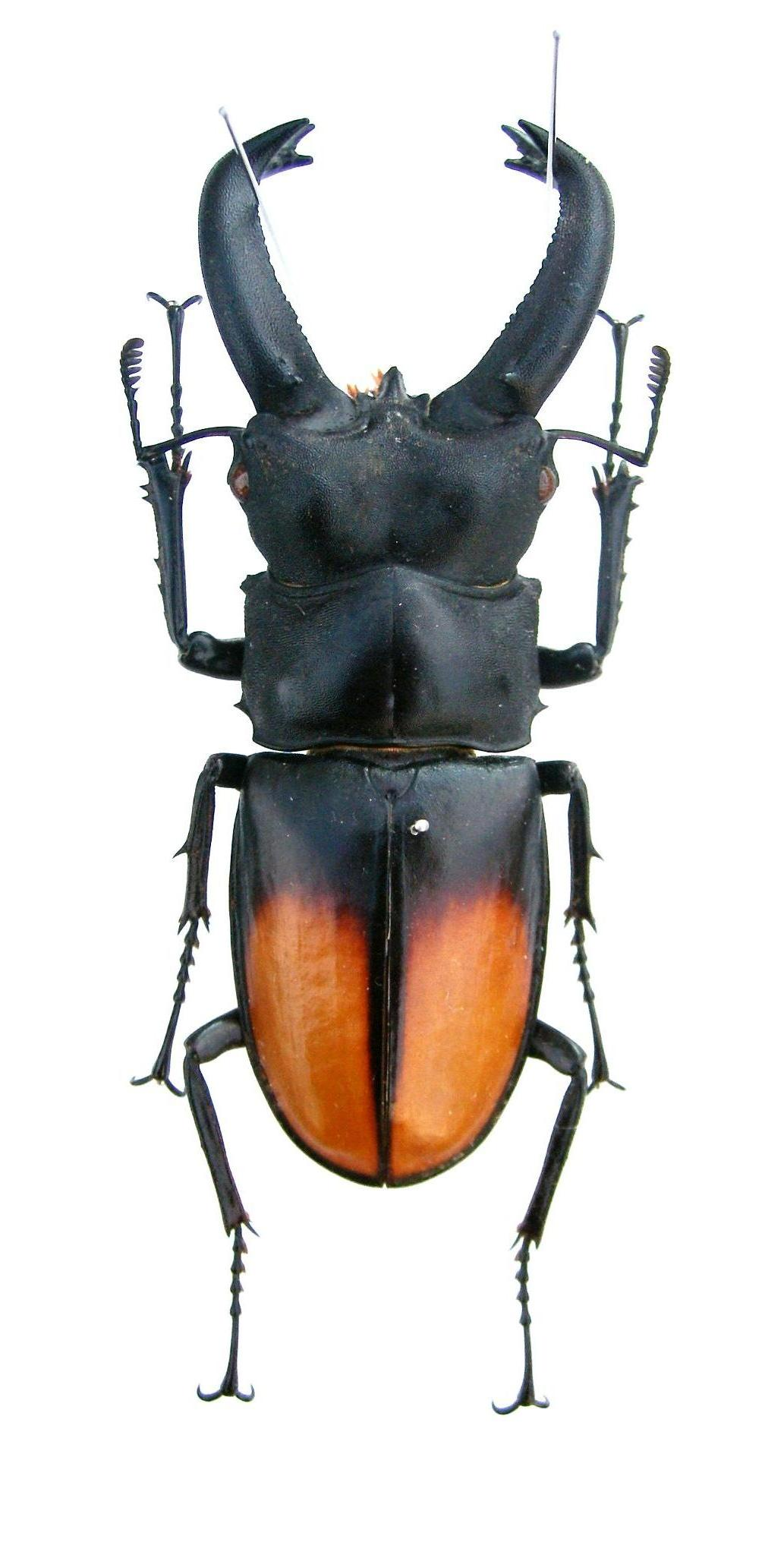
Hexarthrius parryi deyrollei

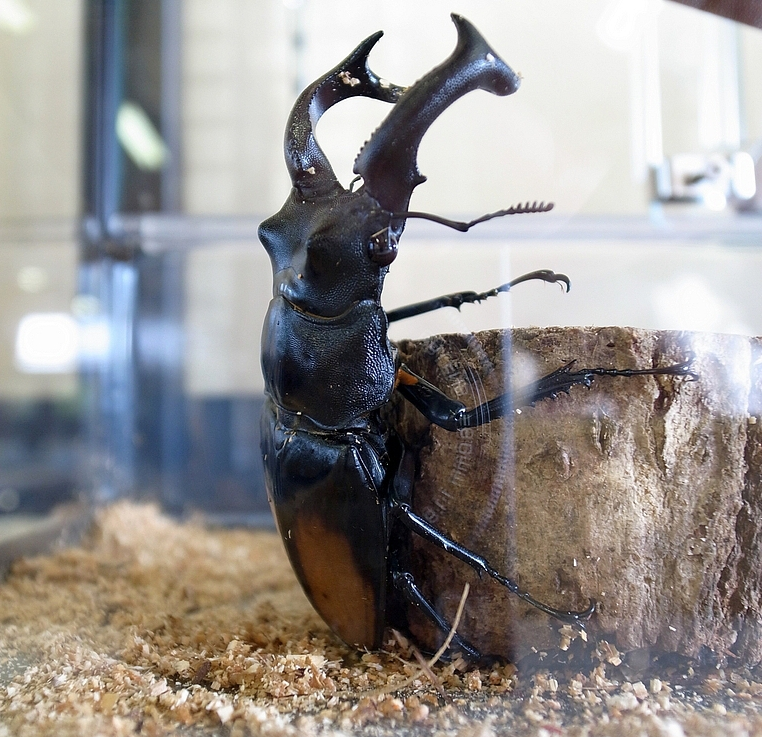
A live individual of Hexarthrius parryi from the Akashi Kaikyo National Park of Awaji Island

== See also ==
- Insect fighting
