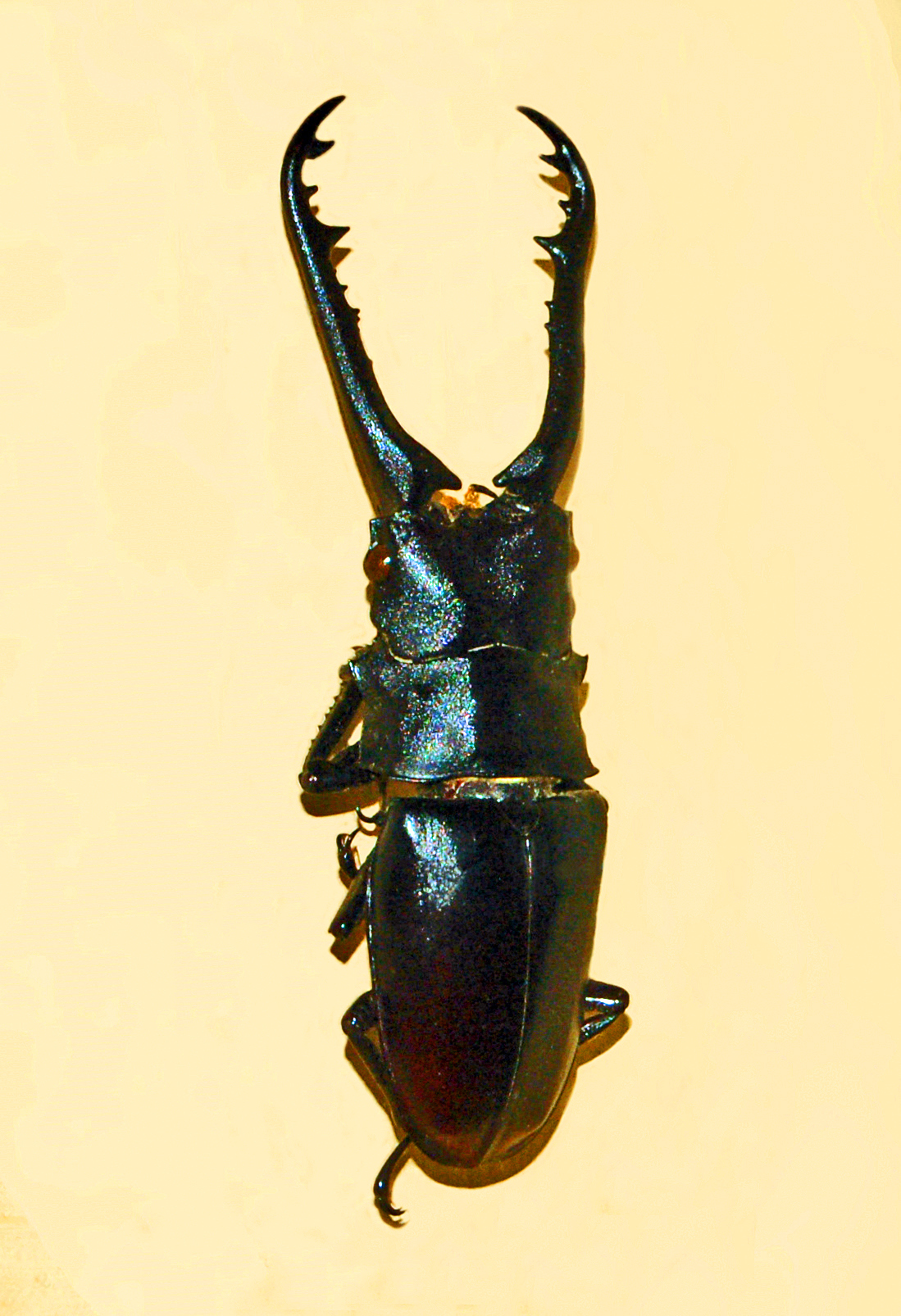
- Cladognathus giraffa from India

Scientific classification
- Kingdom: Animalia
- Phylum: Arthropoda
- Class: Insecta
- Order: Coleoptera
- Suborder: Polyphaga
- Infraorder: Scarabaeiformia
- Family: Lucanidae
- Genus: Cladognathus
- Species: C. giraffa

Binomial name
- Cladognathus giraffa Fabricius, 1794

Synonyms
- Prosopocoilus girafa

= Cladognathus giraffa =

Species of beetle

Cladognathus giraffa is a species of beetles of the family Lucanidae. It is also considered as Prosopocoilus girafa (Olivier, 1789). It can reach a length of about 100–100 mm (3.9–3.9 in) in males and its antler-like jaws reach about half of its total length. The females are much smaller, reaching about 40–60 mm (1.6–2.4 in). The body is flat and completely black, including the antler-like jaws and the legs. Males' jaws show several small teeth along inner edge and are slightly forked at the top. Larvae feed on rotten trunks of trees, while adults feed on saps tree juice. This species occurs from India to Indonesia. The preferred habitat is the tropical rain forests.
