= Platyceroides latus =

Scientific classification
- Domain: Eukaryota
- Kingdom: Animalia
- Phylum: Arthropoda
- Class: Insecta
- Order: Coleoptera
- Suborder: Polyphaga
- Infraorder: Scarabaeiformia
- Family: Lucanidae
- Genus: Platyceroides
- Species: P. latus

Binomial name
- Platyceroides latus (Fall, 1901)

Species of beetle

Platyceroides latus is a species of stag beetle in the family Lucanidae. It is found in North America.
