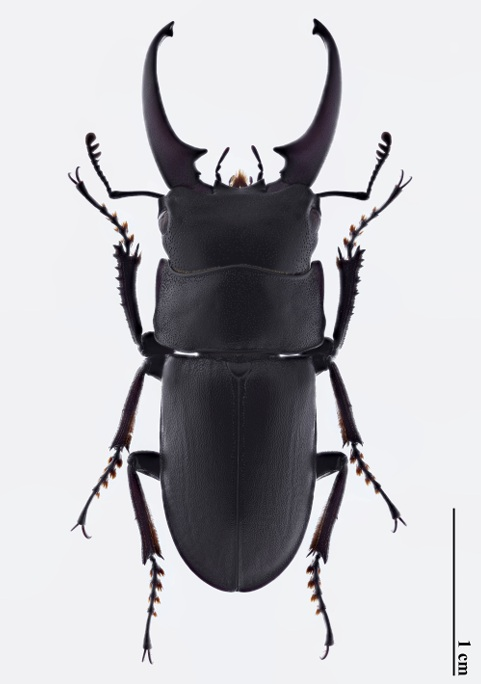
- Falcicornis wangjini

Scientific classification
- Kingdom: Animalia
- Phylum: Arthropoda
- Class: Insecta
- Order: Coleoptera
- Suborder: Polyphaga
- Infraorder: Scarabaeiformia
- Family: Lucanidae
- Subfamily: Lucaninae
- Genus: Falcicornis; Planet, 1894

= Falcicornis =

Genus of beetles

Falcicornis is a genus of beetles of the family Lucanidae.

== Selected species ==
- Falcicornis vidam (Nguyen & Schenk, 2015)
- Falcicornis wangjini Wang & He, 2024
- Falcicornis zhongi Xin & Qi, 2024
