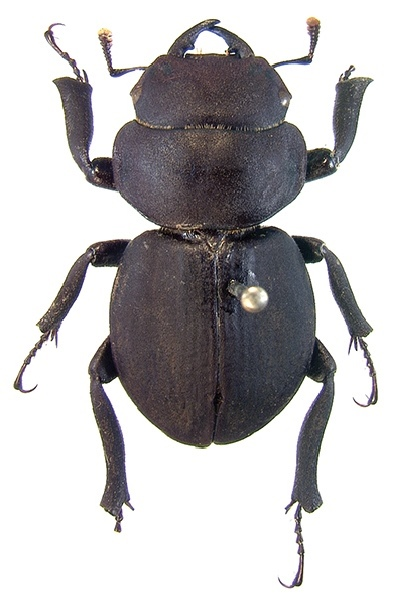
- Apterocyclus honoluluensis

Scientific classification
- Kingdom: Animalia
- Phylum: Arthropoda
- Class: Insecta
- Order: Coleoptera
- Suborder: Polyphaga
- Infraorder: Scarabaeiformia
- Family: Lucanidae
- Subfamily: Lucaninae
- Tribe: Neoprosopocoilini
- Genus: Apterocyclus; Waterhouse, 1871

= Apterocyclus =

Genus of beetles

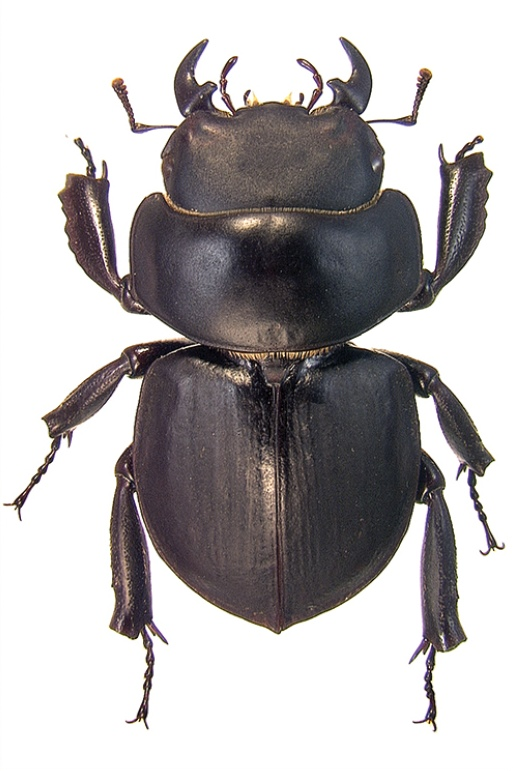
Apterocyclus waterhousei

Apterocyclus is a genus of rare stag beetles in the family Lucanidae. There are about five described species in Apterocyclus. The species of Apterocyclus are found only on the island of Kauai in the Hawaiian Islands, and are the only scarabaeoid beetles native to the Hawaiian Islands.

The Apterocyclus are flightless stag beetles, ranging in size from 14 to 23 mm. There are five recently extant species, although some may now be extinct. More than 130 specimens of Apterocyclus were studied between 1871 and 1922, but very few specimens have been found and placed in institutional collections over the past 50 years. Only three of the five species have been confirmed living since the late 1960s (Apterocyclus honoluluensis, A. kawaii, and A. waterhousei).

Based on subfossils from caves at low elevation, it appears that most species of Apterocyclus became extinct after the arrival of humans to Hawaii. Most of the extant species are now found at higher elevations, above 2,000 feet.

== Species ==
These five species belong to the genus Apterocyclus:

- Apterocyclus honoluluensis Waterhouse, 1871 (Kauai flightless stag beetle)
- Apterocyclus kawaii Paulsen & Hawks
- Apterocyclus munroi Sharp, 1908
- Apterocyclus palmatus Van Dyke, 1921
- Apterocyclus waterhousei Sharp, 1908
