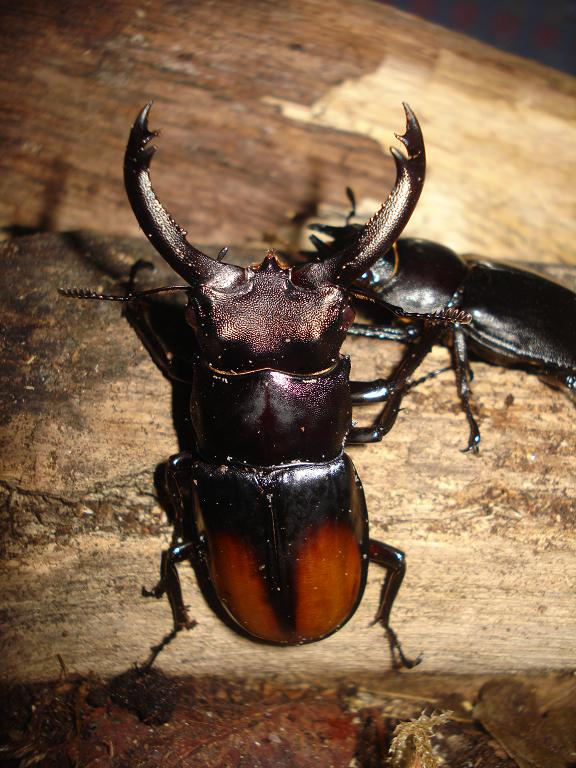
- Male (foreground) and female Hexarthrius parryi. The male is 70 mm (2.8 in) long.

Scientific classification
- Domain: Eukaryota
- Kingdom: Animalia
- Phylum: Arthropoda
- Class: Insecta
- Order: Coleoptera
- Suborder: Polyphaga
- Infraorder: Scarabaeiformia
- Family: Lucanidae
- Tribe: Lucanini
- Genus: Hexarthrius; Hope, 1842

Type species
- Hexarthrius parryi Hope, 1842

= Hexarthrius =

Genus of beetles

Hexarthrius, from Ancient Greek ἕξ (héx), meaning "six", ἄρθρον (árthron), meaning "joint", and the Latin suffix '-ius', is a genus of large stag beetles. They are also known as fork horned stag beetles for the shape for their mandibles It includes the following species:

- Hexarthrius aduncus Jordan & Rothschild, 1894
- Hexarthrius andreasi Schenk, 2003
- Hexarthrius bowringii Parry, 1862
- Hexarthrius buquettii (Hope, 1843)
- Hexarthrius davisoni Waterhouse, 1888
- Hexarthrius forsteri (Hope, 1840)
- Hexarthrius howdeni De Lisle, 1972
- Hexarthrius kirchneri Schenk, 2003
- Hexarthrius mandibularis Deyrolle, 1881
- Hexarthrius melchioritis Séguy, 1954
- Hexarthrius mniszechi (Thomson, 1857)
- Hexarthrius nigritus Lacroix, 1990
- Hexarthrius parryi Hope, 1842
- Hexarthrius rhinoceros (Olivier, 1789)
- Hexarthrius vitalisi Didier, 1925

== See also ==
- Taxonomy of Lucanidae
