= Platyceroides aeneus =

Scientific classification
- Kingdom: Animalia
- Phylum: Arthropoda
- Class: Insecta
- Order: Coleoptera
- Suborder: Polyphaga
- Infraorder: Scarabaeiformia
- Family: Lucanidae
- Genus: Platyceroides
- Species: P. aeneus

Binomial name
- Platyceroides aeneus (Van Dyke, 1928)

Species of beetle

Platyceroides aeneus is a species of stag beetle in the family Lucanidae. It is found in North America.
