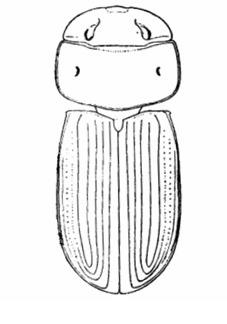
- Sinolucanus cryptonychus

Scientific classification
- Domain: Eukaryota
- Kingdom: Animalia
- Phylum: Arthropoda
- Class: Insecta
- Order: Coleoptera
- Suborder: Polyphaga
- Infraorder: Scarabaeiformia
- Family: Lucanidae
- Subfamily: Lucaninae
- Genus: Sinolucanus; Wang & He, 2025

Synonyms
- Xizangia Zhang, 1988

= Sinolucanus =

Genus of beetles

Sinolucanus is a genus of beetles of the family Lucanidae.

== Taxonomy ==
The genus Xizangia was established by Zhang in 1988 for Xizangia cryptonychus. The generic name Xizangia, however, is a junior homonym of Xizangia (Loftusiida: Orbitolinidae), described by Zhang in 1982. The new replacement name Sinolucanus was established in 2025. When originally described, the genus was placed in the family Trogidae. It was later identified as a member of Lucanidae and synonymized with Penichorlucanus, until it was revalidated.

== Species ==
- Sinolucanus cryptonychus (Zhang, 1988)
- Sinolucanus qiuae (Huang & Chen, 2022)

== Etymology ==
The generic name is a combination of Sino- from Latin Sinae (meaning China) and the genus name Lucanus.
