= Pycnosiphorus =

Scientific classification
- Kingdom: Animalia
- Phylum: Arthropoda
- Class: Insecta
- Order: Coleoptera
- Suborder: Polyphaga
- Infraorder: Scarabaeiformia
- Family: Lucanidae
- Genus: Pycnosiphorus; Solier, 1851

Species
- Pycnosiphorus lessonii (Buquet, 1842); Pycnosiphorus philippi (Westwood, 1864)

Genus of beetles

Pycnosiphorus is a genus of stag beetles found in South America.

== Appearance ==
Relatively small (11–17 millimetres), oblong, black or brown-black stag beetle. The top is more or less covered with gold or orange shells, which can form an orange border of the pronotum or wing covers. The jaws of the males can be slightly enlarged and curved.

== Habitat ==
The species live in temperate forests, often at high altitudes.

== Distribution ==
The genus is found only in Chile and neighbouring areas of Argentina.
