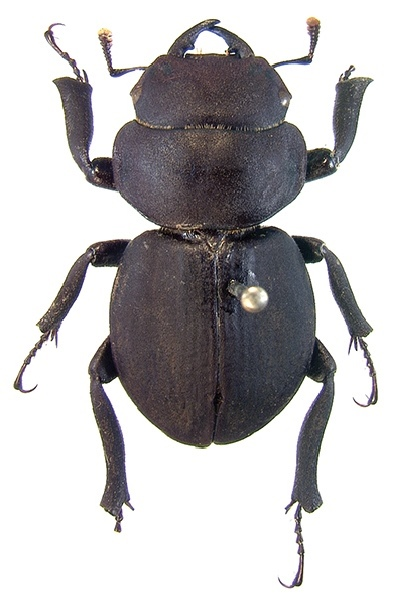
- Apterocyclus honoluluensis

Scientific classification
- Kingdom: Animalia
- Phylum: Arthropoda
- Class: Insecta
- Order: Coleoptera
- Suborder: Polyphaga
- Infraorder: Scarabaeiformia
- Family: Lucanidae
- Subfamily: Lucaninae
- Tribe: Lucanini
- Genus: Apterocyclus
- Species: A. honoluluensis

Binomial name
- Apterocyclus honoluluensis Waterhouse, 1871

= Apterocyclus honoluluensis =

Species of beetle

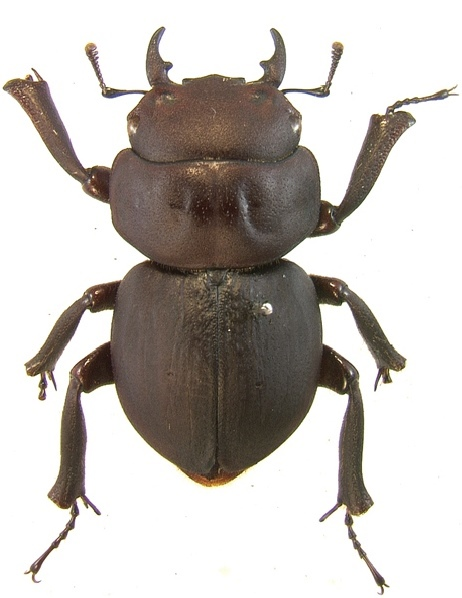
Apterocyclus honoluluensis

Apterocyclus honoluluensis, the Kauai flightless stag beetle, is a species of stag beetle in the family Lucanidae. It is found on the island of Kauai in the Hawaiian Islands.

Apterocyclus honoluluensis is historically and currently the most commonly found species of Apterocyclus, and is known from various locations on Kauai. It is the smallest member of the genus, at a size of 14-17 mm, rarely up to 21 mm.

The larvae were once found in large numbers in soil that contained the decomposing trunks of the tree Acacia koa. The larvae are sensitive to heat, and can be killed by high temperatures. Adults of Apterocyclus honoluluensis have been victims of heavy predation by the mice introduced to the Hawaiian Islands.

In 1994, Apterocyclus honoluluensis was a potential candidate for protection from the Environmental Species Act, but it was declined because of insufficient data on vulnerability, as published in Federal Register Volume 59, Number 219, Pages 58982 - 59028, November 15, 1994.
