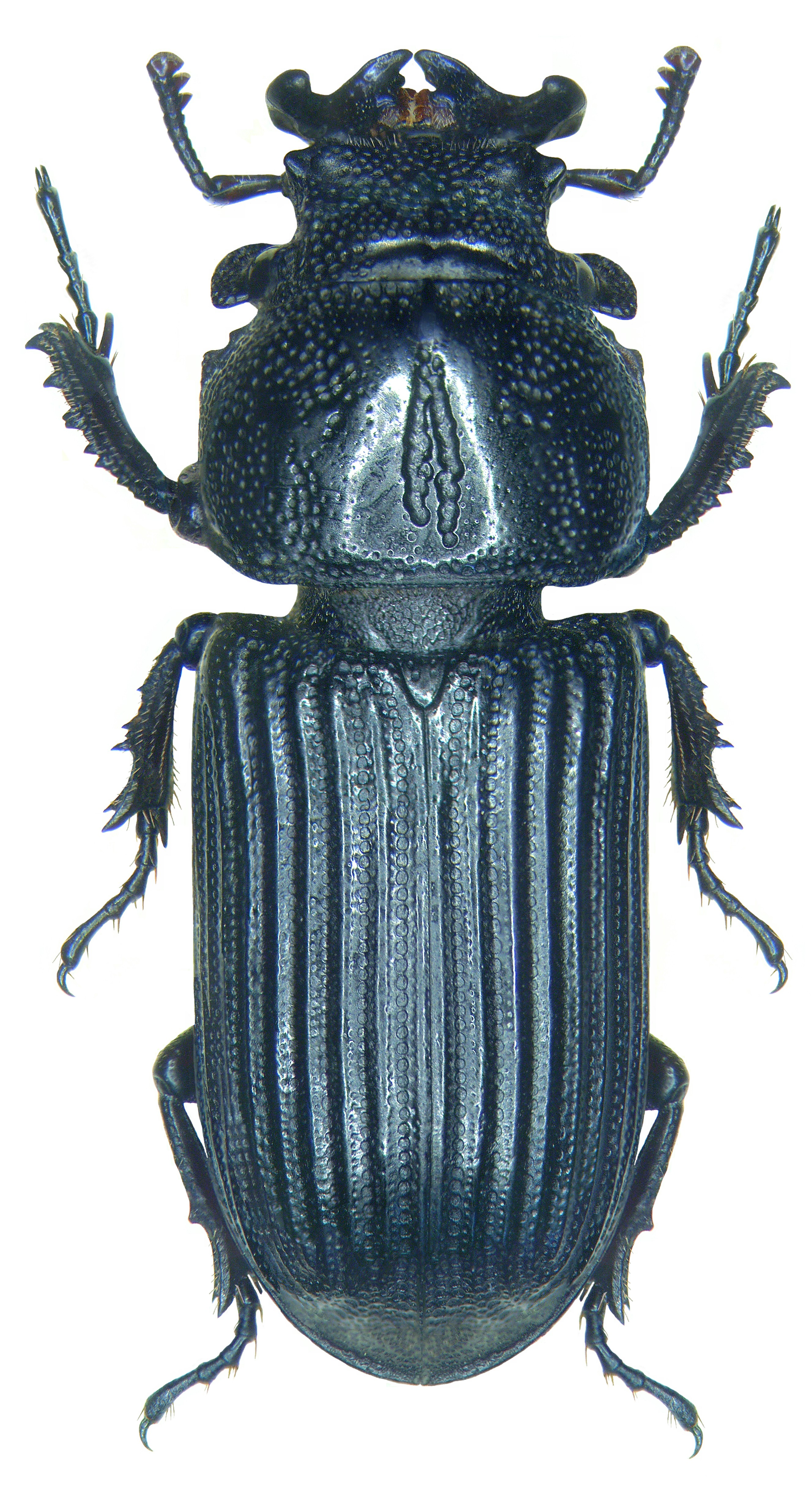
- Nigidius bubalus

Scientific classification
- Kingdom: Animalia
- Phylum: Arthropoda
- Class: Insecta
- Order: Coleoptera
- Suborder: Polyphaga
- Infraorder: Scarabaeiformia
- Family: Lucanidae
- Subfamily: Lucaninae
- Tribe: Nigidiini
- Genus: Nigidius; MacLeay, 1819

Synonyms
- Eudora Castelnau, 1840; Hadronigidius Kraatz, 1896; Nigidia Berthold, 1827; Polytrophus Gistl, 1848

= Nigidius (beetle) =

Genus of beetles

Nigidius is a genus of stag beetles in the subfamily Lucaninae and typical of the tribe Nigidiini; the name was included in William Sharp Macleay's first major work of 1819. Species have been recorded from Africa, India, through to China, Taiwan, Japan and South-East Asia.

== Species ==
The Global Biodiversity Information Facility lists:

1. Nigidius acutangulus Heller, 1917
2. Nigidius amplicollis Quedenfeldt, 1884
3. Nigidius assumiana Okuda & Maeda, 2017
4. Nigidius auriculatus (Guérin-Méneville, 1833)
5. Nigidius baeri Boileau, 1905
6. Nigidius bartolozzii Bomans, 1993
7. Nigidius bega Kriesche, 1922
8. Nigidius bii Huang & Chen, 2017
9. Nigidius birmanicus Boileau, 1911
10. Nigidius bonneuilli Boileau, 1905
11. Nigidius bubalus (Swederus, 1787)
12. Nigidius carreti Séguy, 1953
13. Nigidius cartereti Bomans & Bartolozzi, 1991
14. Nigidius cornutus MacLeay, 1819
15. Nigidius crassus Bomans, 1993
16. Nigidius cribricollis Parry, 1873
17. Nigidius dawnae Gravely, 1915
18. Nigidius decellei Maes, 1990
19. Nigidius delegorguei Thomson, 1862
20. Nigidius dentifer Albers, 1884
21. Nigidius didymus de Lisle, 1964
22. Nigidius distinctus Parry, 1873
23. Nigidius elapraorum Okuda & Maeda, 2018
24. Nigidius elongatus Boileau, 1902
25. Nigidius endroedi Gomes Alves, 1973
26. Nigidius forcipatus Westwood, 1838
27. Nigidius formosanus Bates, 1866
28. Nigidius fruhstorferi Albers, 1894
29. Nigidius georgei Okuda, 2020
30. Nigidius gnu Kriesche, 1920
31. Nigidius grandis Hope, 1841
32. Nigidius gravelyi Paulsen, 2018
33. Nigidius grosseri Schenk, 2016
34. Nigidius haedillus Séguy, 1956
35. Nigidius hageni Ritsema, 1889
36. Nigidius hatayamai Okuda, 2019
37. Nigidius helenae Bomans & Bartolozzi, 1984
38. Nigidius helleri Boileau, 1905
39. Nigidius hemantai Okuda & Maeda, 2016
40. Nigidius himalayae Gravely, 1915
41. Nigidius hysex Séguy, 1953
42. Nigidius impressicollis Boileau, 1905
43. Nigidius inaharai Okuda, 2012
44. Nigidius inouei Bomans & Bartolozzi, 1991
45. Nigidius intermedius Kriesche, 1920
46. Nigidius kinabaluensis Ritsema, 1897
47. Nigidius kolbei Kriesche, 1920
48. Nigidius krausei Bomans, 1993
49. Nigidius laevicollis Westwood, 1837
50. Nigidius laevigatus Harold, 1878
51. Nigidius lamottei Séguy, 1953
52. Nigidius laoticus de Lisle, 1964
53. Nigidius laticornis Boileau, 1911
54. Nigidius lemeei Bomans, 1993
55. Nigidius lettowvorbecki Kriesche, 1920
56. Nigidius lewisi Boileau, 1905
57. Nigidius lichtensteini Ritsema, 1879
58. Nigidius liui Huang & Chen, 2017
59. Nigidius lohi Ochi, Kawahara & Toguchi, 2019
60. Nigidius mazoensis Bomans, 1988
61. Nigidius medimniensis Séguy, 1953
62. Nigidius miwai Nagel, 1941
63. Nigidius mydoni Séguy, 1953
64. Nigidius naingi Nagai, 2000
65. Nigidius neglectus de Lisle, 1964
66. Nigidius negus Bomans, 1993
67. Nigidius nitidus Thomson, 1862
68. Nigidius obesus Parry, 1864
69. Nigidius oblongus Van Roon, 1914
70. Nigidius okudai Fujita, 2010
71. Nigidius oxyotus Fairmaire, 1888
72. Nigidius perforatus Harold, 1878
73. Nigidius phaedimothorax de Lisle, 1974
74. Nigidius punctiger Bomans, 1993
75. Nigidius rhodesianus Péringuey, 1908
76. Nigidius rondoni Bomans, 1993
77. Nigidius sakamakii Okuda, 2008
78. Nigidius seguyi Maes, 1990
79. Nigidius semicariosus Fairmaire, 1891
80. Nigidius simoni Schenk & Mohagan, 2019
81. Nigidius sinicus Schenk, 2011
82. Nigidius splendens Nagel, 1941
83. Nigidius sticheri Okuda & Fukinuki, 2000
84. Nigidius stuhlmanni Kriesche, 1920
85. Nigidius sukkiti Okuda, 2005
86. Nigidius svenjae Schenk, 2006
87. Nigidius walterianus Franciscolo, 1994
88. Nigidius wushuae Lin, 2022
