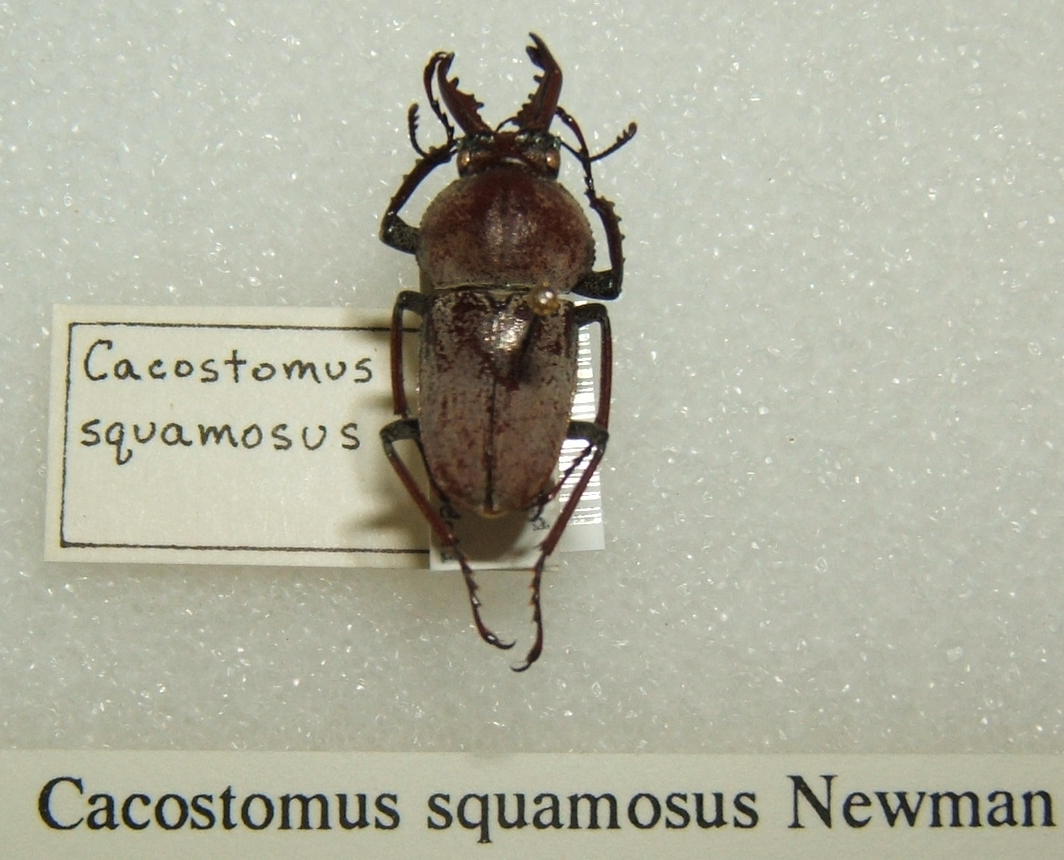
- Cacostomus squamosus, adult

Scientific classification
- Kingdom: Animalia
- Phylum: Arthropoda
- Clade: Pancrustacea
- Class: Insecta
- Order: Coleoptera
- Suborder: Polyphaga
- Infraorder: Scarabaeiformia
- Family: Lucanidae
- Genus: Cacostomus
- Species: C. squamosus

Binomial name
- Cacostomus squamosus Newman, 1840

= Cacostomus squamosus =

Species of beetle

Cacostomus squamosus is a beetle of the family Lucanidae found in Australia. It is a diurnal species reaching a length up to 25 mm in males; it occurs on flowers in the eastern coastal forests of Australia. Its larvae, like those of most species of stag beetles, live in decaying wood.
