= Safrina =

Scientific classification
- Missing taxonomy template (fix): Safrina

Genus of beetles

Safrina is a genus of stag beetles that are endemic to South-eastern Australia.

== Species ==
The Global Biodiversity Information Facility lists:

1. Safrina dekeyzeri Reid & Beatson, 2017
2. Safrina grandis (Lea, 1915)
3. Safrina jaedoni Reid & Beatson, 2016
4. Safrina jugularis (Westwood, 1863)
5. Safrina laticeps (MacLeay, 1885)
6. Safrina moorei Reid & Beatson, 2016
7. Safrina parallela (Deyrolle, 1881)
8. Safrina polita (Carter, 1921)
