= Nils Samuel Swederus =

Swedish naturalist

Nils Samuel Swederus also Svederus (24 August 1751 – 1833) was a Swedish naturalist.

His parents were Sigtuna Magnus Svederus and Anna Maria Christiernin. Nils Samuel Swederus studied theology and other disciplines at the University of Uppsala. He was ordained in 1780 and became a hofpredikanten or Royal Court chaplain in 1782. From 1784 to 1786 he made scientific trips to several European countries—to England, France, Belgium and the Netherlands. In 1789 he became Vicar of Nasby and Ervalla parishes and dean of Fellingsbro. Nils Samuel Swederus was especially interested in entomology and was elected to membership of several learned societies in Sweden and abroad. These included the Royal Swedish Academy of Sciences. He was married to Anna Margareta Oberg.

== Works ==
- 1787 Fortsättning af Beskrifningen på 50 nya Species af Insecter. Kongliga Vetenskaps Academiens Nya Handlingar 8 (10–12): 276–290. Stockholm.
- 1795. Beskrifning på et nytt Genus Pteromalus ibland Insecterna, hörande til Hymenoptera, uti Herr Arch. och Ridd. v. Linnés Systema Naturæ. Kongliga Vetenskaps Academiens Nya Handlingar 16 (7–9, 10–12): 201–205, 216–222. Stockholm.
