= Digonophorus elegans =

Scientific classification
- Kingdom: Animalia
- Phylum: Arthropoda
- Class: Insecta
- Order: Coleoptera
- Suborder: Polyphaga
- Infraorder: Scarabaeiformia
- Family: Lucanidae
- Genus: Digonophorus
- Species: D. elegans

Binomial name
- Digonophorus elegans (Parry, 1862)

Synonyms
- Cladognathus elegans Parry, 1862

Species of beetle

Digonophorus elegans is a species of beetles belonging to the family Lucanidae. It is found in India.
