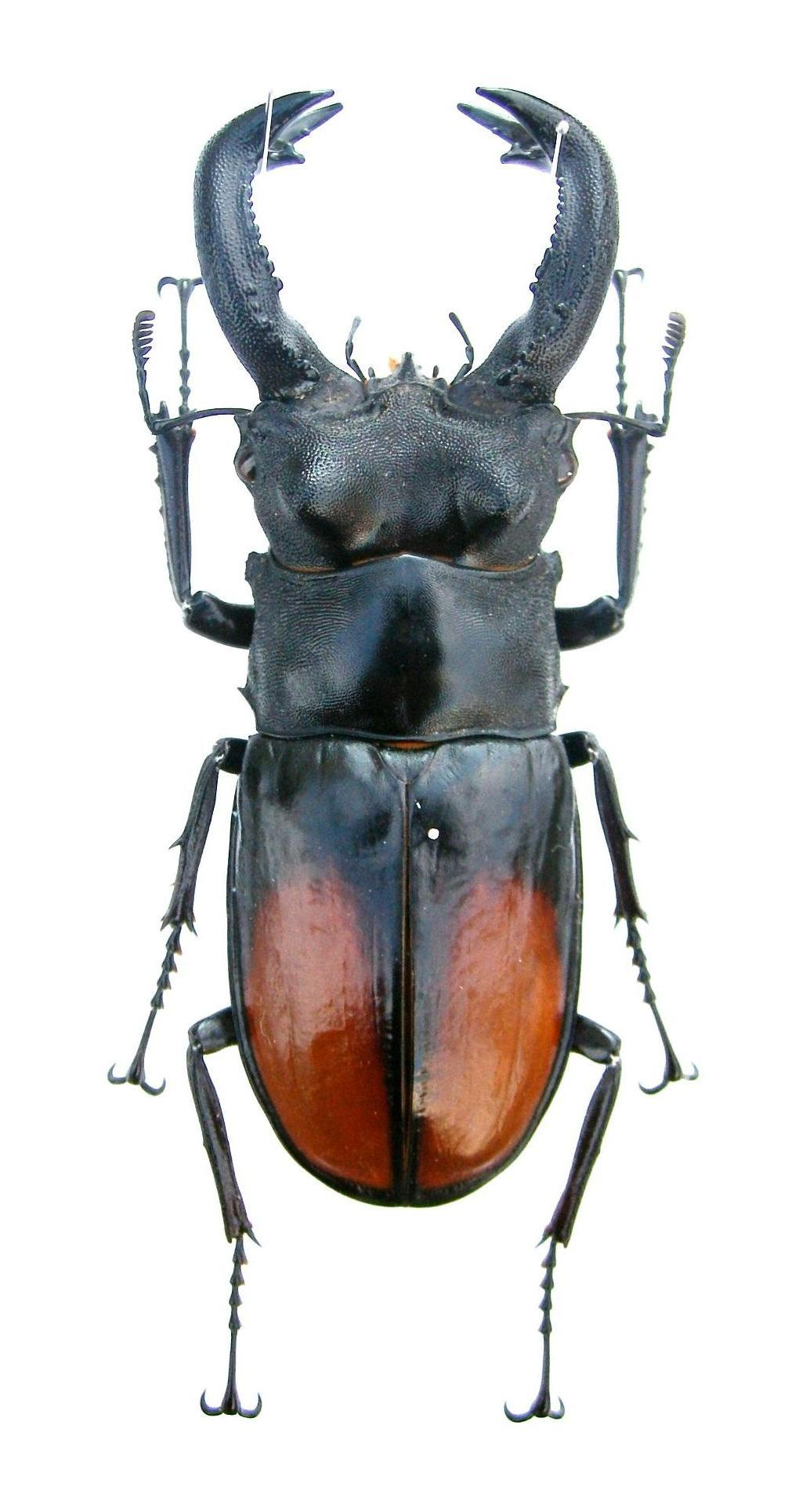
- Male specimen of Hexarthrius parryi paradoxus

Scientific classification
- Kingdom: Animalia
- Phylum: Arthropoda
- Clade: Pancrustacea
- Class: Insecta
- Order: Coleoptera
- Suborder: Polyphaga
- Infraorder: Scarabaeiformia
- Family: Lucanidae
- Subfamily: Lucaninae; Latreille, 1804

Tribes
- about 21, see text

= Lucaninae =

Subfamily of beetles

The Lucaninae comprise the largest subfamily of the stag beetles (Lucanidae).

Characteristics include partial to complete division of the eyes by a canthus, geniculate antennae, and distinctly separated coxae. The body is typically elongated and slightly flattened.

== Tribes and genera ==
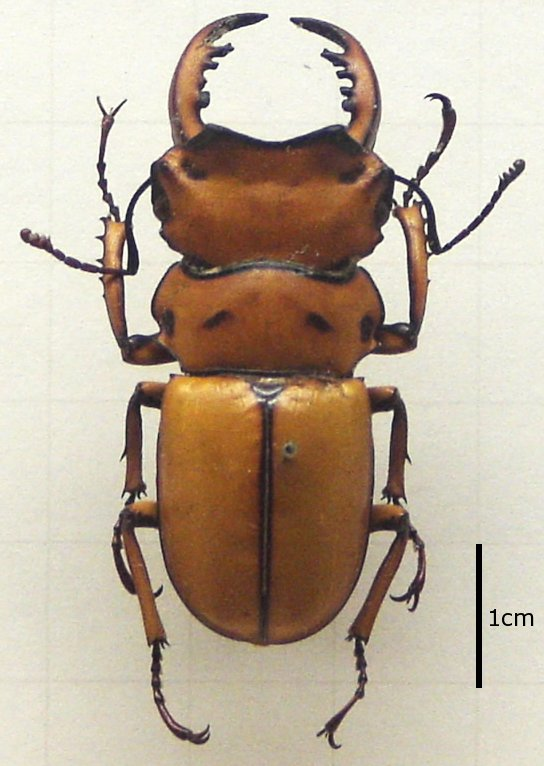
Male specimen of Homoderus mellyi

The following are included in BioLib.cz:

- Aegini Maes, 1992
1. Aegus MacLeay, 1819
2. Irianoaegus Fujita, 2010
- Allotopini Maes, 1992
1. Allotopus Albers, 1894
2. Mesotopus Burmeister in Hope, 1845
- Chiasognathini Burmeister, 1847
1. Chiasognathus Stephens, 1831
2. †Protognathinus Chalumeau & Brochier, 2001
- Cladognathini Parry, 1870
1. Aphanognathus Heller, 1927
2. Bartolozziolucanus Nagai, 1994
3. Capreolucanus Didier, 1928
4. Cladophyllus Houlbert, 1912
5. Cyclommatus Parry, 1863
6. Eligmodontus Houlbert, 1915
7. Gonometopus Houlbert, 1915
8. Katsuraius Nagai, 1996
9. Kirchnerius Schenk, 2009
10. †Palaeognathus Waga, 1883
11. Prismognathus Motschulsky, 1860
12. Prosopocoilus Westwood, 1845: incl. subgenus Cladognathus Burmeister, 1847
13. Pseudorhaetus Planet, 1899
14. Rhaetus Parry, 1864
15. Tetrarthrius Didier, 1926
16. Weinreichius Lacroix, 1978
- Colophonini Maes, 1992
1. Colophon Gray, 1935
- Dendeziini Benesh, 1955
1. Dendezia Basilewsky, 1952
2. Oonotus Parry, 1864
3. Xiphodontus Westwood, 1838
- Dorcini Parry, 1864
1. Aulacostethus Waterhouse, 1869
2. Cantharolethrus Thomson, 1862
3. Dorcus MacLeay, 1819 (synonyms: Dynodorcus, Telodorcus, Macrodorcas)
4. Eulepidius Westwood, 1874
5. Falcicornis Planet, 1894
6. Gnaphaloryx Burmeister, 1847
7. Hemisodorcus Thomson, 1862
8. Metallactulus Ritsema, 1881
9. Microlucanus Bomans & Bartolozzi, 1996
10. Serrognathus Motschulsky, 1861
11. Sinodorcus Huang & Chen, 2013
12. Velutinodorcus Maes, 1992
- Figulini Burmeister, 1847
1. Agnelius Paulsen, 2017
2. Brasilucanus Vulcano & Pereira, 1961
3. Cardanus (beetle) Westwood, 1834
4. Diasomoides Schenk, 2002
5. Epipedesthus de Lisle, 1976
6. Figulus W.S. MacLeay, 1819
7. Penichrolucanus Deyrolle, 1863
8. Platyfigulus Arrow, 1935
9. Sinolucanus Wang & He, 2024
10. Vinsonella Arrow, 1940
- Homoderini Maes, 1992
1. Homoderus Parry, 1862
- Leptinopterini Jakobson, 1911
1. Leptinopterus Hope, 1838
- Lissapterini
1. Bomansius Lacroix, 1978
2. Dorculus Didier, 1930
3. Geodorcus Holloway, 1996
4. Hoplogonus Parry, 1875
5. Lissapterus Deyrolle, 1870
6. Lissotes Westwood, 1855: incl. L. latidens – "Wielangta stag beetle"
7. Paralissotes Holloway, 1996
- Lucanini Latreille, 1804
1. Casignetus MacLeay, 1819
2. Chewlucanus Ikeda & Katsura, 2000
3. Eolucanus Kurosawa, 1970
4. Hexarthrius Hope, 1843
5. Lucanus Scopoli, 1763
6. Noseolucanus Araya & Tanaka, 1998
7. Sphaenognathus Buquet, 1838
8. Yumikoi Arnaud & Miyashita, 2006
- Neoprosopocoilini
1. Aegognathus Leuthner, 1883
2. Apterocyclus Waterhouse, 1871
3. Apterodorcus Arrow, 1943
4. Auxicerus Waterhouse, 1883
5. Charagmophorus Waterhouse, 1895
6. Macrocrates Burmeister, 1847
- Nigidiini Jakobson, 1911
1. Agnus Burmeister, 1847
2. Amneidus Coquerel, 1866
3. Dinonigidius de Lisle, 1974
4. Ganelius Benesh, 1955
5. Nigidionus Kriesche, 1926
6. Nigidius (beetle) MacLeay, 1819
7. Novonigidius Dudich, 1923
- Odontolabini Parry, 1870
1. Calcodes Westwood, 1834
2. Heterochthes Westwood, 1864
3. Neolucanus Thomson, 1862
4. Odontolabis Hope, 1842
- Platycerini Mulsant, 1842
1. Platycerus Geoffroy, 1762
2. †Succiniplatycerus Nikolajev, 1990
- Platyceroidini Paulsen & Hawks, 2008
1. Platyceroides Benesh, 1946
2. Platyceropsis Benesh, 1946
- Pseudodorcini Benesh, 1960
1. Aegognatus Leuthner, 1883
2. Pseudodorcus Parry, 1870
- Rhaethulini Miwa, 1931
1. Rhaetulus Westwood, 1871
- Ryssonotini Benesh, 1960
1. Cacostomus Newman, 1840: incl. C. squamosus
2. Eucarteria Lea, 1914
3. Ryssonotus MacLeay, 1819
4. Safrina Reid & Beatson, 2016
- Sclerostomini Benesh, 1955
1. Altitatiayus Weinreich, 1960
2. Andinolucanus Arnaud & Bomans, 2006
3. Arnaudius Grossi & Bartolozzi, 2011
4. Caenolethrus Thomson, 1862
5. Chileistomus Weinreich, 1960
6. Erichius Maes, 1992
7. Metadorcinus Kriesche, 1922
8. Metadorcus Parry, 1870 (syn. Beneshius)
9. Montesinus Grossi, 2016
10. Onorelucanus Bartolozzi & Bomans, 1989
11. Pycnosiphorus Solier, 1851
12. Sclerodorcinus Soares & Grossi, 2025
13. Sclerostomulus Weinreich, 1960
14. Sclerostomus Burmeister, 1847
15. Scortizus Westwood, 1834
16. Zikanius Grossi & Paulsen, 2009

Incertae sedis and fossil genera

- †Cretolucanus Nikolajev, 2007
- Incadorcus Arnaud & Bomans, 2006
- †Miocenidorcus Riou, 1999
- Pseudoscortizus Arnaud et al., 2008
