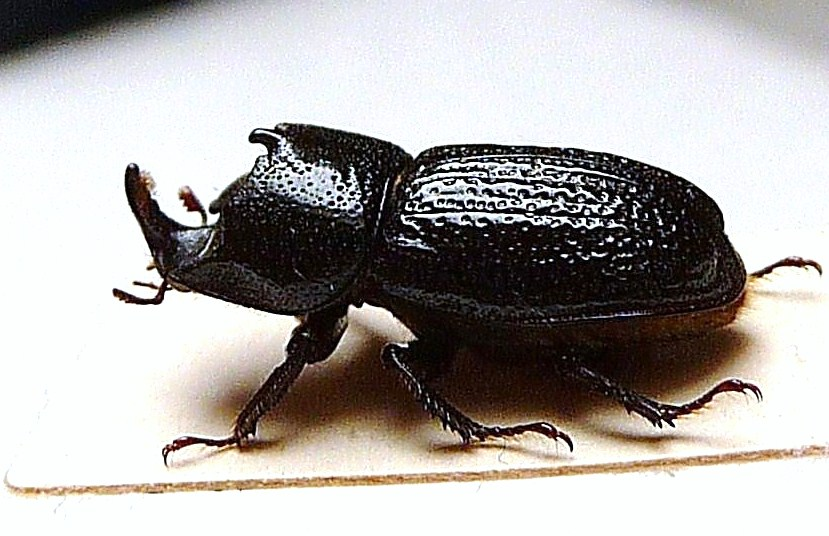
- Sinodendron cylindricum

Scientific classification
- Kingdom: Animalia
- Phylum: Arthropoda
- Clade: Pancrustacea
- Class: Insecta
- Order: Coleoptera
- Suborder: Polyphaga
- Infraorder: Scarabaeiformia
- Family: Lucanidae
- Subfamily: Syndesinae
- Genus: Sinodendron; Hellwig, 1791

= Sinodendron =

Genus of beetles

Sinodendron is a genus of beetles belonging to the family Lucanidae.

The species of this genus are found in Europe, Western Asia and Northern America.

== Species ==
- Sinodendron cylindricum (Rhinoceros stag beetle) (Linnaeus, 1758) - Eurasia
- Sinodendron persicum Reitter, 1902 - Iran (Hyrcanian forests)
- Sinodendron rugosum (Rugose stag beetle) (Mannerheim, 1843) - From California (United States) to Alberta (Canada)
- Sinodendron yunnanense Král, 1994 - China (Yunnan, Henan)
