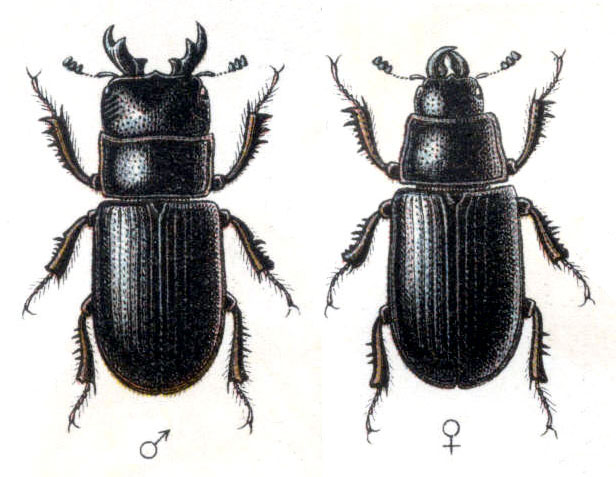

Conservation status
- Near Threatened (IUCN 3.1)

Scientific classification
- Domain: Eukaryota
- Kingdom: Animalia
- Phylum: Arthropoda
- Class: Insecta
- Order: Coleoptera
- Suborder: Polyphaga
- Infraorder: Scarabaeiformia
- Family: Lucanidae
- Genus: Ceruchus
- Species: C. chrysomelinus

Binomial name
- Ceruchus chrysomelinus (Hochenwarth, 1785)

= Ceruchus chrysomelinus =

Species of beetle

Ceruchus chrysomelinus is a species of beetle belonging to the family Lucanidae.

It is native to Eurasia.
