= Syndesinae =

Scientific classification
- Kingdom: Animalia
- Phylum: Arthropoda
- Clade: Pancrustacea
- Class: Insecta
- Order: Coleoptera
- Suborder: Polyphaga
- Infraorder: Scarabaeiformia
- Family: Lucanidae
- Subfamily: Syndesinae; MacLeay, 1819

Subfamily of beetles

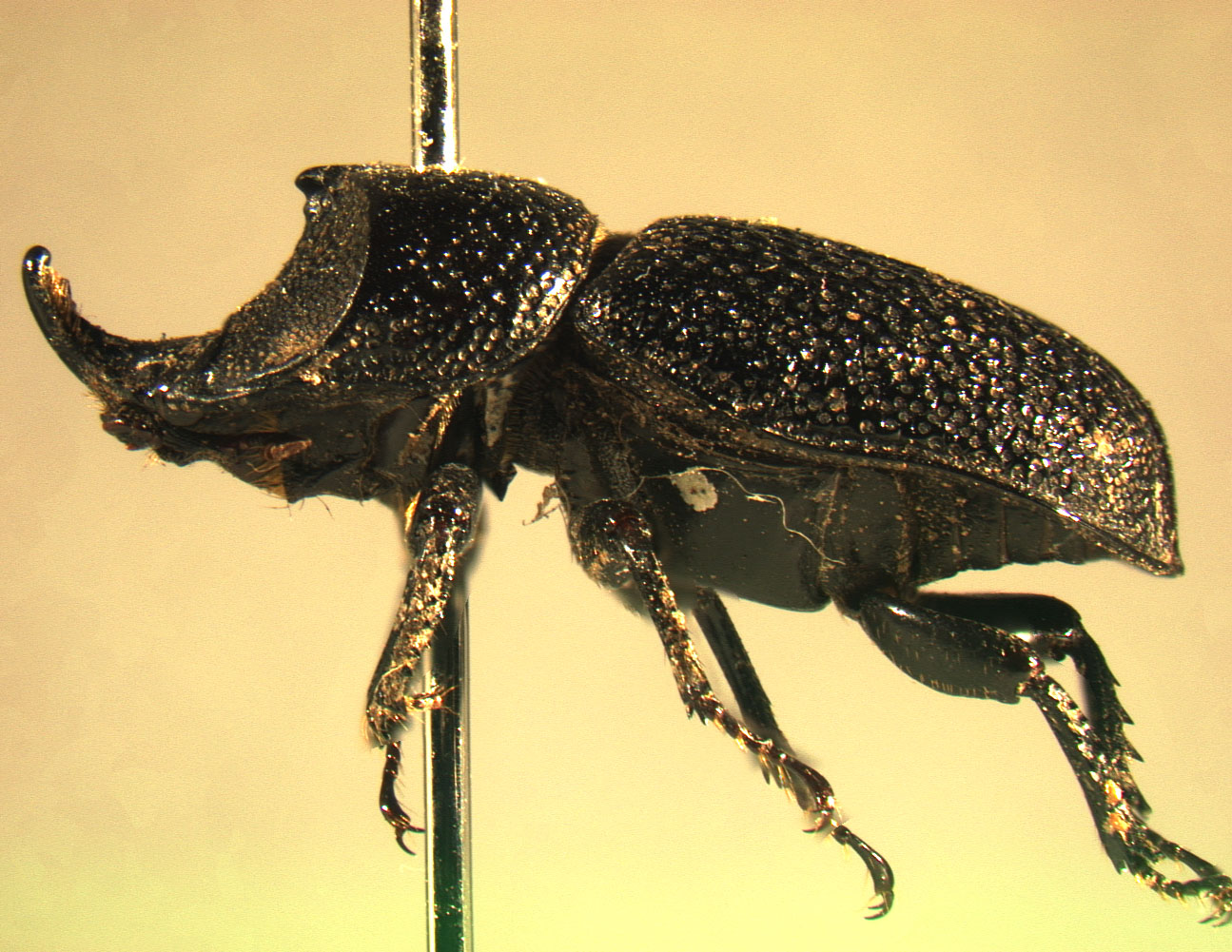

Syndesinae is a subfamily of stag beetles in the family Lucanidae. There are at least 2 genera and 24 described species in Syndesinae. It is found in North America, Europe and Eurasia with the greatest diversity in Yunnan and Sichuan, China.

== Genera ==
These two genera belong to the subfamily Syndesinae:

- Ceruchus MacLeay, 1819^{i c g b}
- Sinodendron Hellwig, 1791^{i c g b}

Data sources: i = ITIS, c = Catalogue of Life, g = GBIF, b = Bugguide.net
