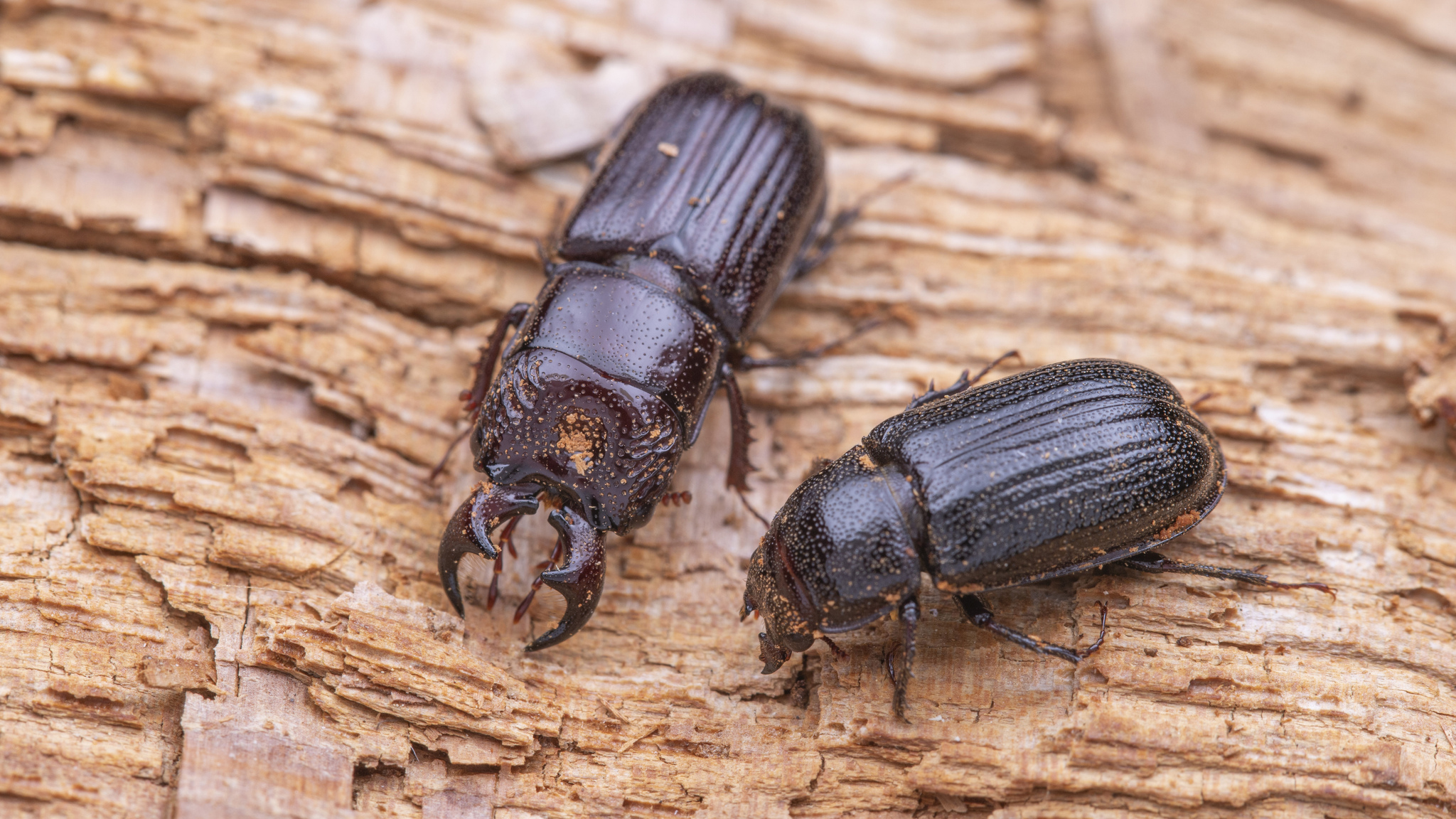

Scientific classification
- Kingdom: Animalia
- Phylum: Arthropoda
- Clade: Pancrustacea
- Class: Insecta
- Order: Coleoptera
- Suborder: Polyphaga
- Infraorder: Scarabaeiformia
- Family: Lucanidae
- Genus: Ceruchus
- Species: C. piceus

Binomial name
- Ceruchus piceus (Weber, 1801)

Synonyms
- Ceruchus virginiensis Casey, 1914; Platycerus balbi Laporte, 1840

= Ceruchus piceus =

Species of beetle

Ceruchus piceus is a species of stag beetle in the family Lucanidae. It is found in North America.
