= Ceruchus punctatus =

Scientific classification
- Domain: Eukaryota
- Kingdom: Animalia
- Phylum: Arthropoda
- Class: Insecta
- Order: Coleoptera
- Suborder: Polyphaga
- Infraorder: Scarabaeiformia
- Family: Lucanidae
- Genus: Ceruchus
- Species: C. punctatus

Binomial name
- Ceruchus punctatus LeConte, 1869

Species of beetle

Ceruchus punctatus is a species of stag beetle in the family Lucanidae. It is found in North America.
