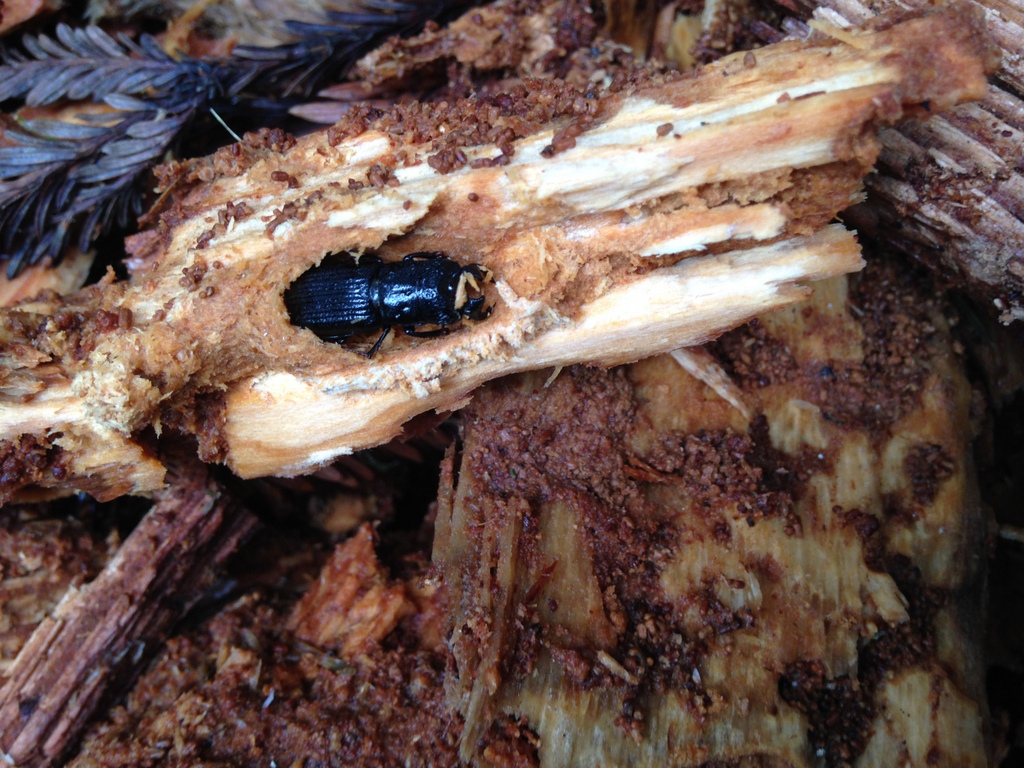
- Stag Beetle, Ceruchus striatus

Scientific classification
- Domain: Eukaryota
- Kingdom: Animalia
- Phylum: Arthropoda
- Class: Insecta
- Order: Coleoptera
- Suborder: Polyphaga
- Infraorder: Scarabaeiformia
- Family: Lucanidae
- Genus: Ceruchus
- Species: C. striatus

Binomial name
- Ceruchus striatus LeConte, 1859

= Ceruchus striatus =

Species of beetle

Ceruchus striatus is a species of stag beetle in the family Lucanidae. It is found in North America.
