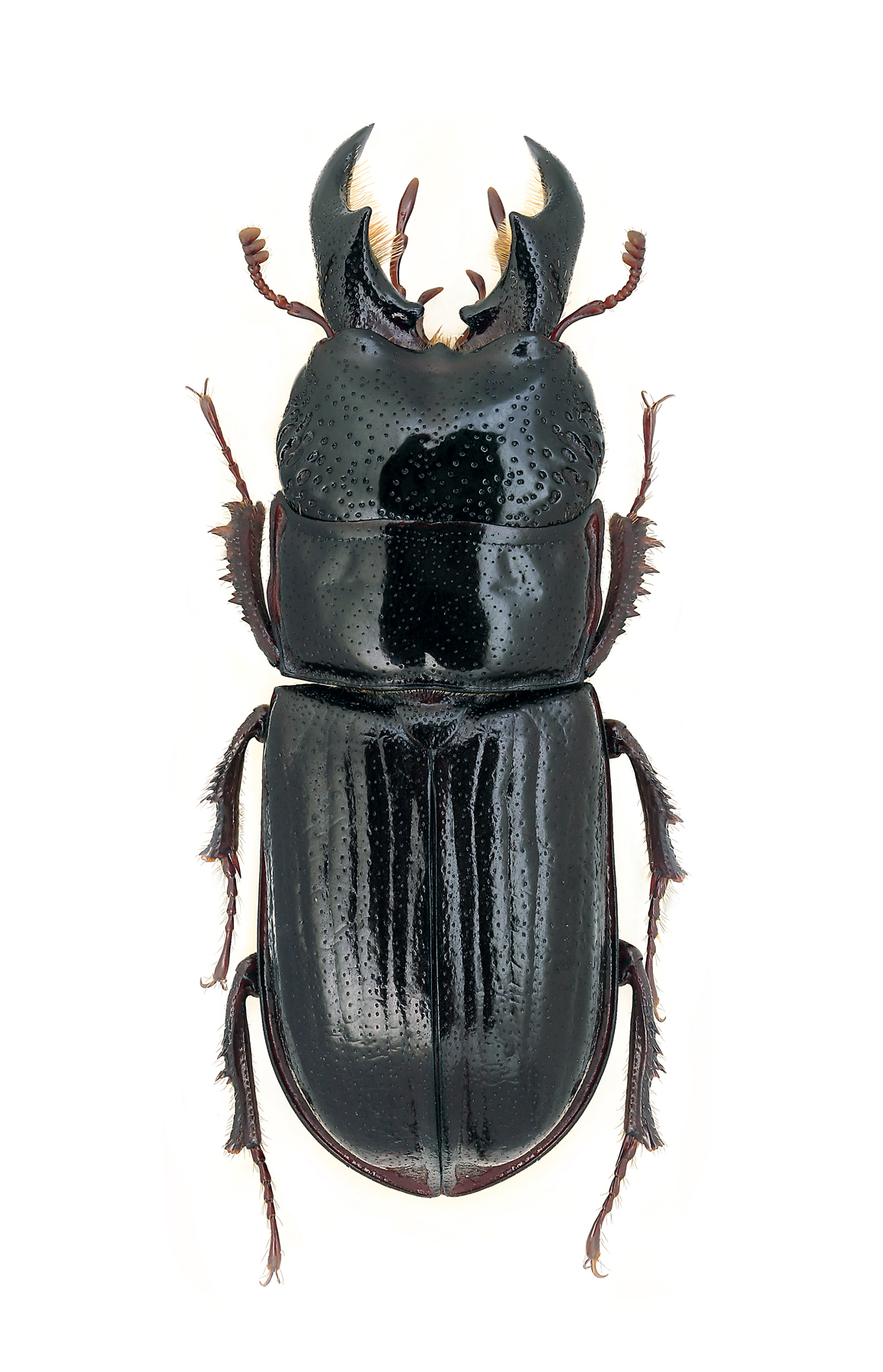
- Ceruchus chrysomelinus

Scientific classification
- Kingdom: Animalia
- Phylum: Arthropoda
- Clade: Pancrustacea
- Class: Insecta
- Order: Coleoptera
- Suborder: Polyphaga
- Infraorder: Scarabaeiformia
- Family: Lucanidae
- Subfamily: Syndesinae
- Genus: Ceruchus; MacLeay, 1819

= Ceruchus =

Genus of beetles

Ceruchus is a genus of stag beetles in the family Lucanidae. It is found in Europe, Asia, the United States and Canada with the highest diversity in China.

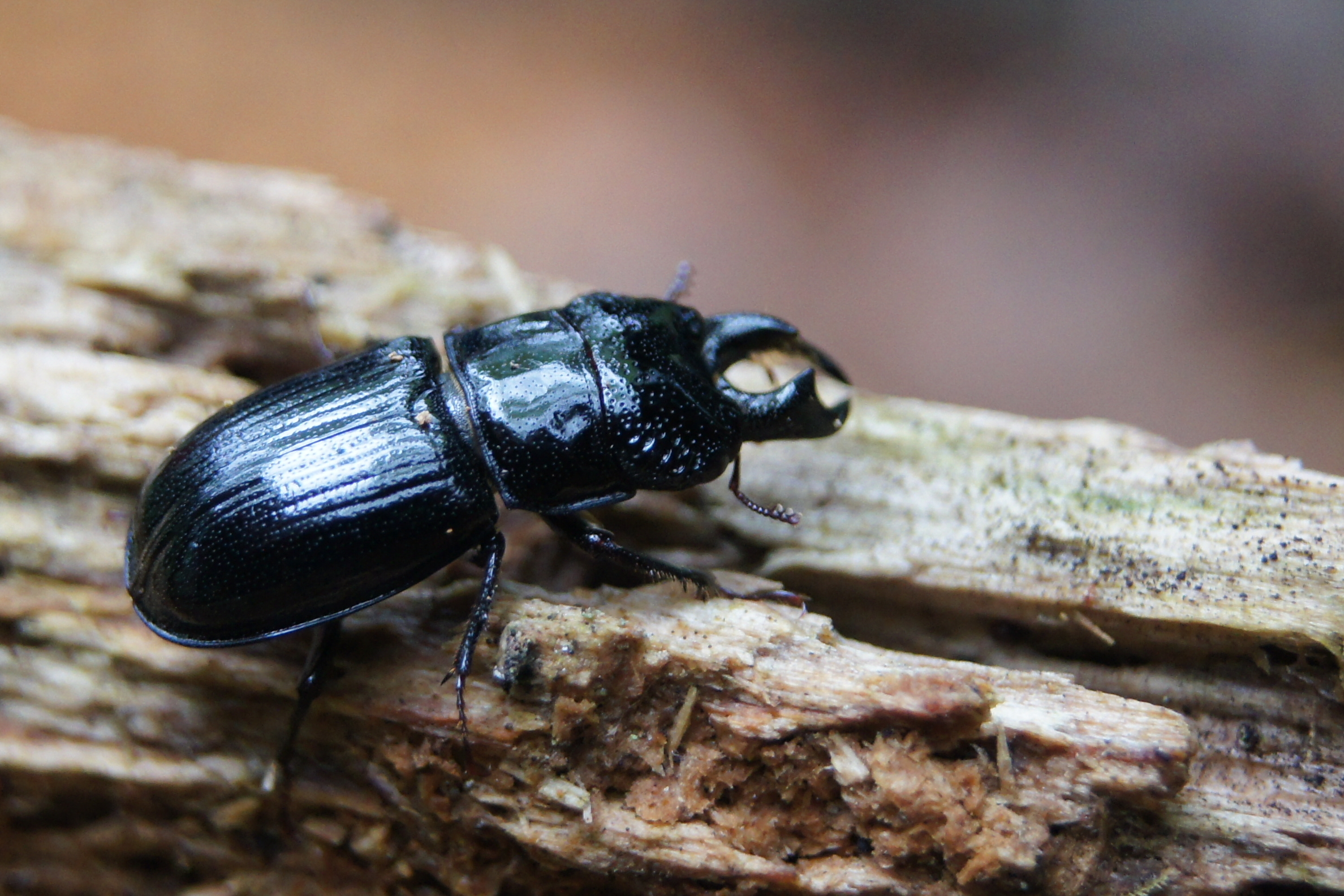
Ceruchus chrysomelinus

== Species ==
These 20 species belong to the genus Ceruchus:

- Ceruchus atavus Fairmaire, 1891 - India (Jammu, Kashmir)
- Ceruchus chrysomelinus (Hochenwarth, 1785) - Europe
- Ceruchus chuduraziensis Okuda, 2007 - Myanmar (Kachin)
- Ceruchus deuvei Boucher & Kral, 1997 - China (Sichuan)
- Ceruchus ganyanae Huang & Chen, 2017 - China (Sichuan)
- Ceruchus katerinae Kral, 1995 - China (Sichuan)
- Ceruchus lignarius Lewis, 1883 - Japan and Russia (Sakhalin, Kuril Islands)
- Ceruchus luojishanensis Okuda, 2008 - China (Sichuan)
- Ceruchus minor Tanikado & Okuda, 1994 - China (Shaanxi, Henan, Sichuan)
- Ceruchus motuoensis Huang, Chen, Tao & Xiao, 2020 - China (Tibet)
- Ceruchus niger Boucher & Kral, 1997 - China (Yunnan, Sichuan)
- Ceruchus piceus (Weber, 1801) - From Missouri (United States) and Manitoba (Canada) to Nova Scotia (Canada)
- Ceruchus punctatus LeConte, 1869 - From California (United States) to Alberta (Canada)
- Ceruchus reginae Boucher & Kral, 1997 - China (Yunnan)
- Ceruchus sinensis Nagel, 1933 - China (Yunnan)
- Ceruchus striatus LeConte, 1859 - From California (United States) to British Columbia (Canada)
- Ceruchus tabanai Okuda, 2008 - China (Sichuan)
- Ceruchus yangi Huang, Imura & Chen, 2011 - China (Guizhou)
- Ceruchus yingqii Huang & Chen, 2013 - China (Sichuan)

=== Fossil species ===
- Ceruchus fuchsii Wickham, 1911 - Colorado (United States)
