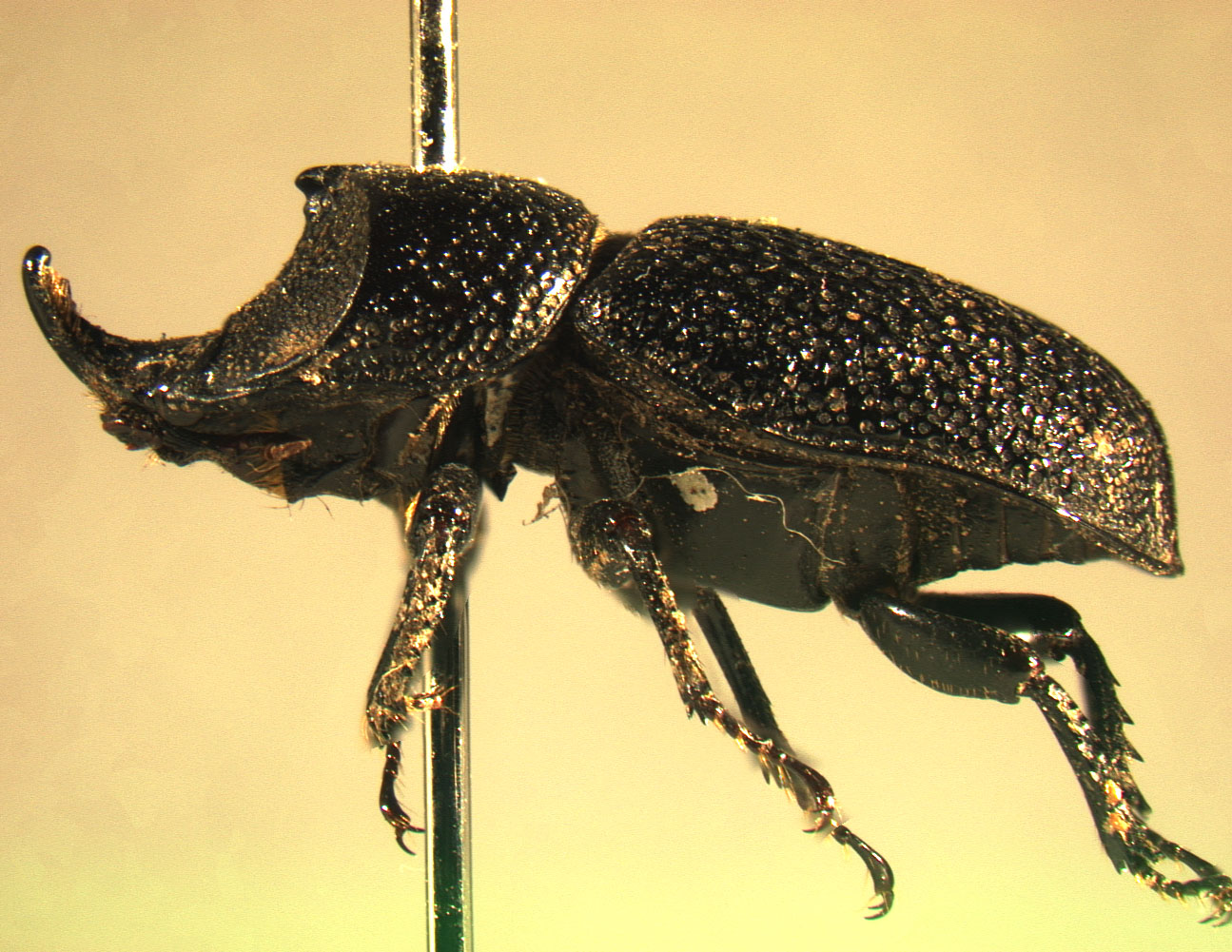
- Male Sinodendron rugosum

Scientific classification
- Kingdom: Animalia
- Phylum: Arthropoda
- Clade: Pancrustacea
- Class: Insecta
- Order: Coleoptera
- Suborder: Polyphaga
- Infraorder: Scarabaeiformia
- Family: Lucanidae
- Genus: Sinodendron
- Species: S. rugosum

Binomial name
- Sinodendron rugosum (Mannerheim, 1843)

= Sinodendron rugosum =

Species of beetle

Sinodendron rugosum is a species of the family Lucanidae, the stag beetles. It is commonly referred to as the rugose stag beetle, and is the only known member of the genus Sinodendron to occur in western North America.

== Description ==
The adults of this species exhibit sexual dimorphism, a common trait in Lucanidae, as well as unopposable clubbed antennae. Both sexes are 11–18 millimetres (0.43–0.71 in) in length, black in coloration, and have small mandibles. The pronotum and elytra are covered in many small pits, leading to an overall rugose appearance. The head of the male is much narrower than the pronotum, and has a short, median rhinoceros-like horn. The female either lacks a horn or has a small median tubercle.

== Range ==
Sinodendron rugosum is found in moist woodlands from British Columbia to California. Adults are commonly found on the ground from spring to early summer.

== Life history ==
The white, C-shaped larvae hatch on bark and tunnel inward, creating pupal chambers in decaying wood. They have been associated with oak, alder, willow and cherry. Adults may feed on plant juices or aphid honeydew. The horn of the male is occasionally used in combat with other males in order to establish dominance when competing for mates.

== Predators ==
Sinodendron rugosum has been identified as one of many species eaten by the Northern Spotted Owl Strix occidentalis.
