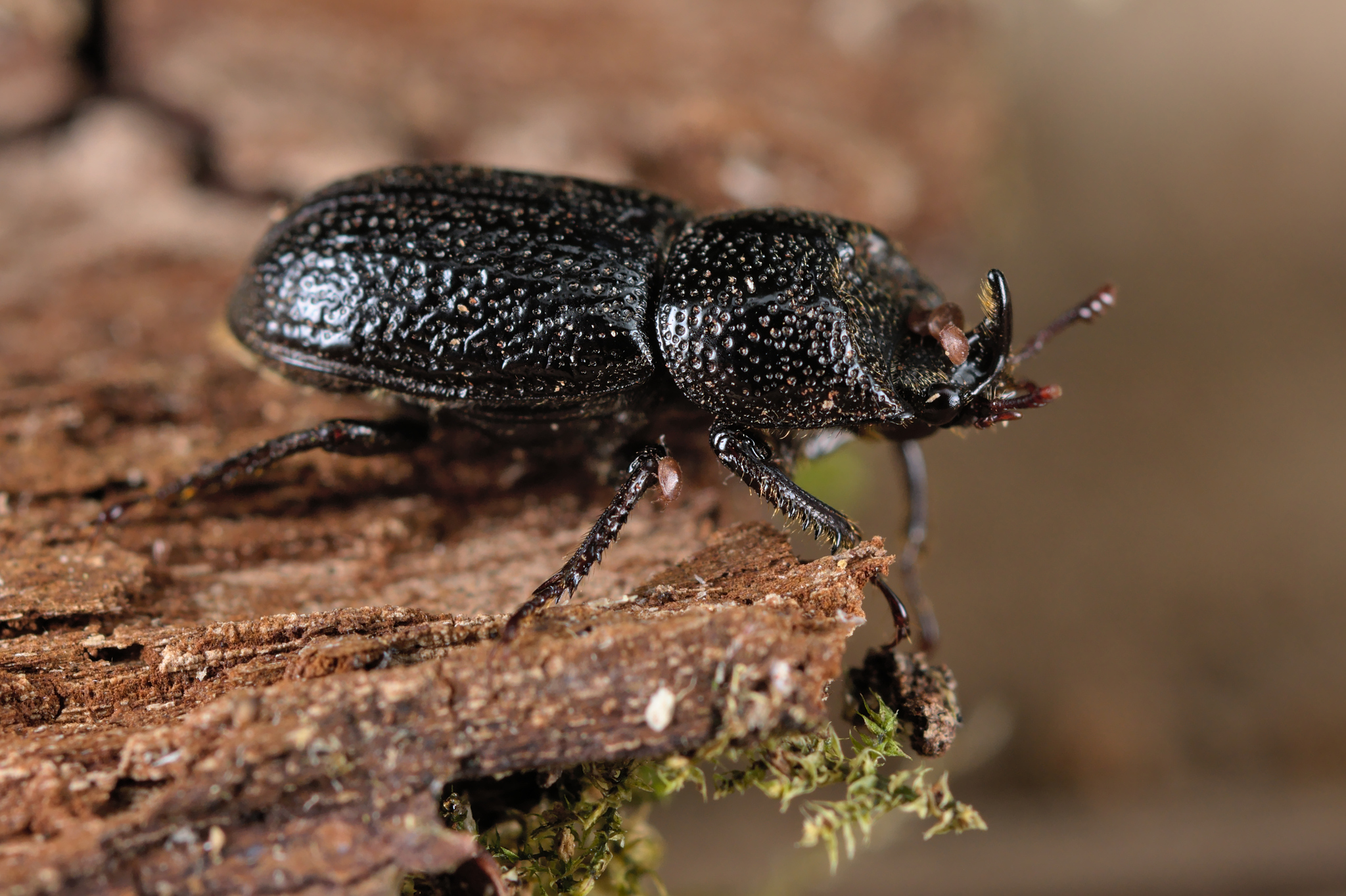
- A male on a log

Scientific classification
- Kingdom: Animalia
- Phylum: Arthropoda
- Class: Insecta
- Order: Coleoptera
- Suborder: Polyphaga
- Infraorder: Scarabaeiformia
- Family: Lucanidae
- Genus: Sinodendron
- Species: S. cylindricum

Binomial name
- Sinodendron cylindricum (Linnaeus, 1758)

= Sinodendron cylindricum =

Species of beetle

Sinodendron cylindricum, the rhinoceros stag beetle, horned stag beetle, or simply the rhinoceros beetle, is a species of stag beetle native to Europe. It is characterised by a clear sexual dimorphism.

== Description ==
The beetles reach a body length of 12 to 16 millimeters and have a very shiny, black body, sometimes with turquoise sheen. Despite being in the family Lucanidae (stag beetles), they look rather like true rhinoceros beetles, which are well known for their rhinoceros-like horn. The body is cylindrical and the elytra and thorax have distinct rows of pits and grooves. The males have a well-developed horn on their heads, which is significantly smaller in the females. In addition, the cavities on the pronotum in the female are much shallower than the distinct cavities in the male. The larvae are white and soft with brown heads.

== Distribution and habitat ==
With the exception of southwestern Spain and Portugal and northern Scandinavia, the species occurs throughout the European continent and the British Isles to western Siberia. The beetle prefers primary deciduous forests at cooler and higher altitudes, but can also be found in old willow stands, avenue and street trees, parkland, hedgerows, and fruit trees.

== Lifecycle and diet ==
=== Lifecycle ===
Like all beetles, these insects go through complete metamorphosis, starting as a larva, which is soft and white going through several instars before becoming a pupa and then reaching maturity, emerging in Spring or Summer. The larvae develop mainly in white rotten wood of various deciduous trees, varying from tree stumps to logs. The range of proven food plants includes oak, beech, birch, alder, hornbeam, aspen, willow, linden, maple, horse chestnut, ash, rowan, apple, cherries, pears, plums and firs. In addition, the species is often associated with the flat lacquer polypore (Ganoderma applanatum), the tinder fungus (Fomes fomentarius) and the oak fire agaric (Fomitiporia robusta). Their development takes three to four years, pupation takes place in the wood.

=== Diet ===
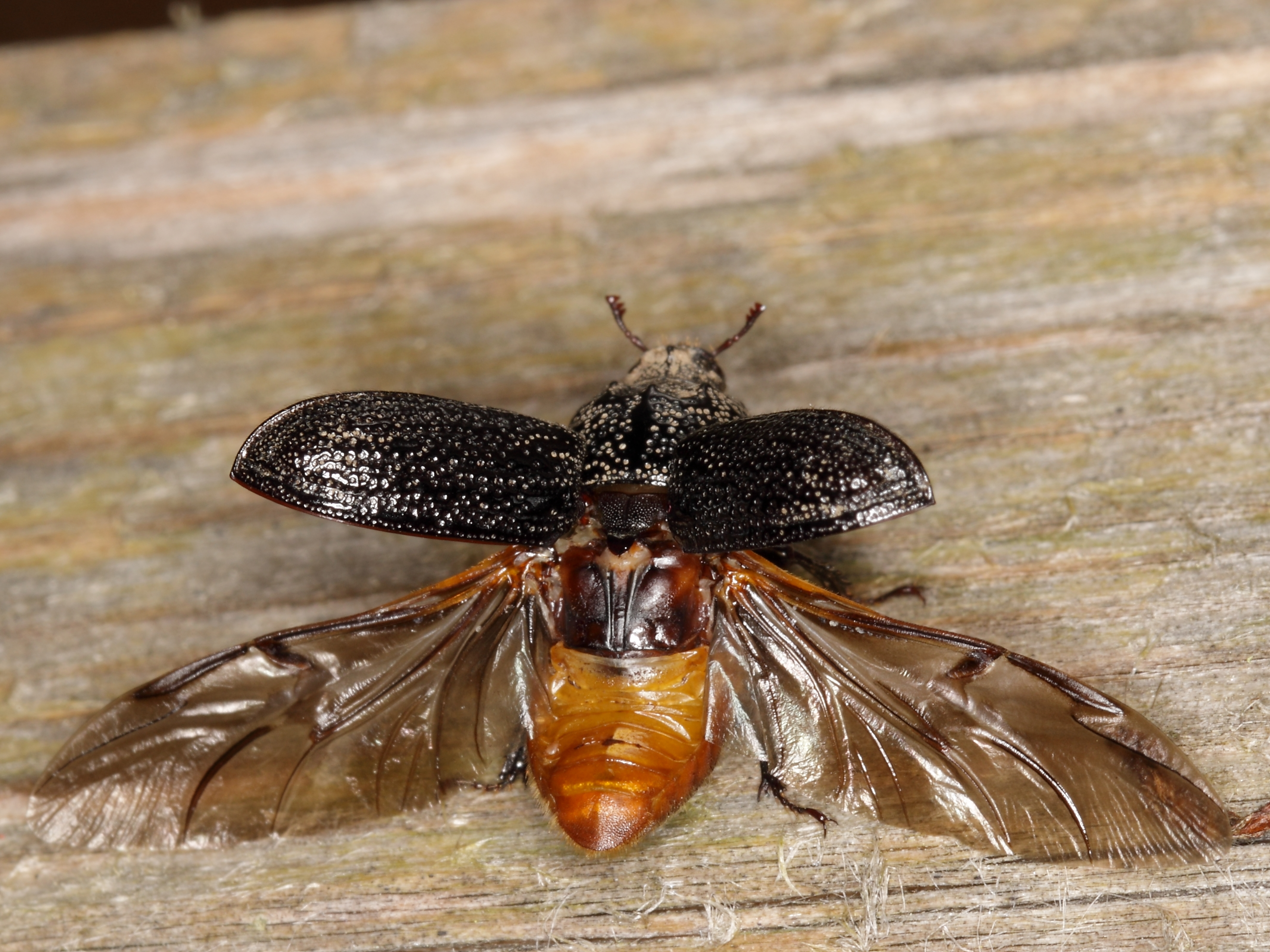
Taking off

S. cylindricum larvae feed on rotting wood, whereas the adults feed on tree sap.

== Conservation ==
The species is rare in Central Europe, it is listed as "endangered" (category 3) in the Red List of Threatened Species in Germany, only in North Rhine-Westphalia is the species considered "endangered" (category 2) and in other federal states as " potentially endangered". In Baden-Württemberg this species is not classified as endangered.
