= 2011 in literature =

This article contains information about the literary events and publications of 2011.

== Events ==
- June 7 – Ransom Riggs publishes his young-adult novel Miss Peregrine's Home for Peculiar Children, which pins its narrative around a series of earlier private photographs he had collected. It remains top of The New York Times Children's Chapter Books list for 45 weeks and founds a series of five novels.
- July – J. K. Rowling ends her relationship with her long-standing agent Christopher Little and joins his rival, Neil Blair.
- September 24 – The first 100 Thousand Poets for Change Day takes place, the organization having been founded by Michael Rothenberg and Terri Carrion in March.
- November 12 – The Ahmet Hamdi Tanpınar Literature Museum Library opens in Istanbul, Turkey.

== New books ==
=== Fiction ===
- Chris Adrian – The Great Night
- Kevin Barry – City of Bohane
- Giannina Braschi – United States of Banana
- T. C. Boyle – When the Killing's Done
- Geraldine Brooks – Caleb's Crossing
- Kate Christensen – The Astral: A Novel
- Patrick deWitt – The Sisters Brothers
- E. L. Doctorow – All the Time in the World
- Steve Earle – I'll Never Get Out of This World Alive
- Esi Edugyan – Half-Blood Blues
- Jeffrey Eugenides – The Marriage Plot
- James Frey – The Final Testament of the Holy Bible
- Hallgrímur Helgason – Konan við 1000° (The Woman at 1000°)
- Chad Harbach – The Art of Fielding
- Alan Hollinghurst – The Stranger's Child
- E. L. James – Fifty Shades of Grey
- Mat Johnson – Pym
- Stephen Kelman – Pigeon English
- Philip Kerr – Prague Fatale
- Ben Lerner – Leaving the Atocha Station
- Merethe Lindstrøm – Days in the History of Silence (Dager i stillhetens historie)
- Javier Marías – Los enamoramientos (The Infatuations)
- Andrew Miller – Pure
- Haruki Murakami (村上 春樹) – 1Q84
- Téa Obreht – The Tiger's Wife
- Michael Ondaatje – The Cat's Table
- Ann Patchett – State of Wonder
- Chuck Palahniuk – Damned
- Tom Perrotta – The Leftovers
- Arthur Phillips – The Tragedy of Arthur
- Rodrigo Rey Rosa – Severina (novella)
- Karen Russell – Swamplandia!
- Stig Sæterbakken – Through the Night (Gjennom natten)
- Faruk Šehić – Knjiga o Uni (Quiet Flows the Una)
- Colm Tóibín – The Empty Family
- Zlatko Topčić – The Final Word
- Juan Gabriel Vásquez – The Sound of Things Falling (El ruido de las cosas al caer)
- David Foster Wallace – The Pale King

=== Children and young people ===
- David Almond – The True Tale of the Monster Billy Dean
- Kelley Armstrong – The Gathering
- Stéphane-Yves Barroux – Mr Leon's Paris
- Paula Bossio – El Lapiz (The Pencil, 2016)
- Andy Griffiths – The 13-Storey Treehouse (first in the Treehouse series of seven books)
- Anthony Horowitz – Scorpia Rising
- Jon Klassen – I Want My Hat Back
- Gordon Korman, Peter Lerangis, Rick Riordan, and Jude Watson – Vespers Rising
- Derek Landy – Skulduggery Pleasant: Kingdom of the Wicked
- Patricia McKissack (with Leo and Diane Dillon) – Never Forgotten
- Michael Morpurgo – The Pied Piper of Hamelin
- Courtney Allison Moulton – Angelfire
- Brandon Mull – Beyonders: A World Without Heroes
- Christopher Paolini – Inheritance
- Jerry Pinkney (adaptation) – Twinkle, Twinkle, Little Star
- Catherine Rayner – Solomon Crocodile
- Rick Riordan
  - The Throne of Fire
  - The Son of Neptune
- Douglas Wood – Franklin and Winston: A Christmas That Changed the World

=== Poetry ===
See 2011 in poetry.

- Rae Armantrout – Money Shot (February)
- Billy Collins – Horoscopes for the Dead (April)
- Mehr Lal Soni Zia Fatehabadi – Meri Tasveer (Urdu, My Portrait)
- Susan Howe – That This (February)
- Alice Notley – Culture of One (March)
- Sarah Palin (edited by Michael Solomon) – I Hope Like Heck (June 21)
- Michael Palmer – Thread (May)
- Lee Wardlaw – Won Ton: A Cat Tale Told in Haiku

=== Drama ===
- Richard Bean – One Man, Two Guvnors (adaptation)
- Alecky Blythe – London Road (musical verbatim theatre)
- Nick Dear – Frankenstein
- Vivienne Franzmann – Mogadishu
- Rodrigo García – Golgota Picnic
- Stephen Adly Guirgis – The Motherfucker with the Hat
- Sam Holcroft – Edgar and Annabel
- Stephen Karam – Sons of the Prophet
- Andrew Motion – Incoming
- Various authors – Sixty-Six Books

=== Science fiction and fantasy ===
- Joe Abercrombie – The Heroes
- Daniel Abraham
  - The Dragon's Path
  - Leviathan Wakes (writing as James S. A. Corey, with Ty Franck)
- Ann Aguirre – Aftermath
- Greg Bear – Halo: Cryptum
- Lauren Beukes – Zoo City
- Jack Campbell – The Lost Frontier: Beyond the Frontier: Dreadnought
- Orson Scott Card – The Lost Gate
- Ernest Cline – Ready Player One
- Michael Crichton & Richard Preston – Micro
- David Anthony Durham – The Sacred Band
- Greg Egan – The Clockwork Rocket
- William Giraldi – Busy Monsters
- Michael Grant — Plague
- Mira Grant – Deadline
- Lev Grossman – The Magician King
- Stephen Hunt – The Rise of the Iron Moon
- Stephen King — 11/22/63
- Sharon Lee & Steve Miller – Ghost Ship
- Pittacus Lore — The Power of Six
- George R. R. Martin – A Dance with Dragons
- China Miéville – Embassytown
- Andrew Miller – Pure
- Karen Miller – A Blight of Mages
- Terry Pratchett – Snuff
- Hannu Rajaniemi – The Quantum Thief
- Brian Ruckley – The Edinburgh Dead
- Brandon Sanderson – The Alloy of Law
- John Scalzi – Fuzzy Nation
- Dan Simmons – Flashback
- Neal Stephenson – Reamde
- Charles Stross – Rule 34
- Michael Swanwick – Dancing with Bears
- Catherynne M. Valente – Deathless
- Vernor Vinge – The Children of the Sky
- Jo Walton – Among Others
- David Weber – How Firm a Foundation
- Robert Charles Wilson – Vortex
- Daniel Wilson – Robopocalypse

=== Crime and Thrillers ===
- Kate Atkinson – Started Early, Took My Dog
- Steve Berry – The Jefferson Key
- Lee Child – The Affair
- Michael Connelly – The Fifth Witness
- Jeffery Deaver – Carte Blanche
- Ted Dekker and Tosca Lee – Forbidden
- Ted Dekker – The Priest's Graveyard
- Ranj Dhaliwal – Daaku: The Gangster's Life
- Sue Grafton – V is for Vengeance
- John Grisham – The Litigators
- Joe R. Lansdale
  - Hyenas: a Hap and Leonard Novella
  - Devil Red
- Henning Mankell – The Troubled Man
- Jo Nesbø – The Snowman
- Donald Ray Pollock – The Devil All the Time
- Guillermo del Toro and Chuck Hogan – The Night Eternal
- Nicolaas Vergunst – Knot of Stone
- Ferdinand von Schirach – Der Fall Collini (The Collini Case)
- S. J. Watson – Before I Go to Sleep

=== Non-fiction ===
- Peter Bergen – The Longest War: The Enduring Conflict between America and Al-Qaeda
- Abhinav Bindra – A Shot at History: My Obsessive Journey to Olympic Gold
- Michael Bronski – A Queer History of the United States
- David Brooks – The Social Animal
- Richard Dawkins – The Magic of Reality: How We Know What's Really True
- Joan Didion – Blue Nights
- Douglas Edwards – I'm Feeling Lucky
- Ulrich Eberl – Life in 2050
- Tina Fey – Bossypants
- John M. Findlay and Bruce Hevly - Atomic Frontier Days: Hanford and the American West
- Joshua Foer – Moonwalking with Einstein
- James Gleick – The Information: A History, a Theory, a Flood
- Brian Greene – The Hidden Reality
- Yuval Noah Harari – קיצור תולדות האנושות (Ḳitsur toldot ha-enoshut, Sapiens: A Brief History of Humankind)
- Matthew Hollis – Now All Roads Lead to France
- Louis Hyman – Debtor Nation
- Zlatan Ibrahimović and David Lagercrantz – I Am Zlatan Ibrahimović (Jag är Zlatan Ibrahimović)
- Daniel Kahneman – Thinking, Fast and Slow
- David King – Death in the City of Light: The Serial Killer of Nazi-Occupied Paris
- Joshua Knelman – Hot Art
- Lawrence M. Krauss – Quantum Man: Richard Feynman's Life in Science
- Erik Larson – In the Garden of Beasts: Love, Terror, and an American Family in Hitler's Berlin
- Joseph Lelyveld – Great Soul: Mahatma Gandhi and His Struggle With India
- Steven Levy – In The Plex: How Google Thinks, Works, and Shapes Our Lives
- Charles C. Mann – 1493: Uncovering the New World Columbus Created
- Rajiv Malhotra – Breaking India
- David McCullough – The Greater Journey
- Ben Mezrich – Sex on the Moon
- Scott Miller – The President and the Assassin
- Dana Priest – Top Secret America
- Annie Proulx – Bird Cloud: A Memoir
- Janet Reitman – Inside Scientology: The Story of America's Most Secretive Religion
- Sylvain Tesson – The Consolations of the Forest
- Sarah Vowell – Unfamiliar Fishes
- Matt Welch and Nick Gillespie – The Declaration of Independents
- Daniel Yergin – The Quest
- Mitchell Zuckoff – Lost in Shangri-La

== Deaths ==
- January 2 – Robert Trumble, Australian writer (born 1919)
- January 4
  - Eva Strittmatter, German author and poet (born 1930)
  - Dick King-Smith English children's writer (born 1922)
- January 10 – Joe Gores, American novelist and screenwriter (born 1931)
- January 11 – Marcel Trudel, Canadian historian and author (born 1917)
- January 14 – Sun Axelsson, Swedish novelist (born 1935)
- January 15 – Romulus Linney, American playwright (born 1930)
- January 16 – R. F. Langley, English poet and diarist (born 1938)
- January 17 – Jean Dutourd, French novelist (born 1920)
- January 19 – Wilfrid Sheed, English-born American novelist and essayist (born 1930)
- January 20
  - F. A. Nettelbeck, American poet (born 1950)
  - Reynolds Price, American author (born 1933)
- January 22 – Park Wan-suh, South Korean novelist (born 1931)
- January 23 – Novica Tadić, Serbian poet (born 1949)
- January 24 – Anna Yablonskaya, Ukrainian playwright and poet (born 1981)
- January 25 – Vincent Cronin, English writer (born 1924)
- January 29
  - Loreen Rice Lucas, Canadian author (born 1914)
  - Hemayel Martina, Curaçaon poet (born 1990)
- January 30 – Hisaye Yamamoto, Japanese American author (born 1921)
- February 2 – Eric Nicol, Canadian author (born 1919)
- February 3 – Édouard Glissant, Martinique poet and critic writing in French (born 1928)
- February 5
  - Charles E. Silberman, American author (born 1925)
  - Martin Quigley Jr., American author and publisher (born 1917)
  - Brian Jacques, English children's writer (born 1939)
- February 9 – David Sánchez Juliao, Colombian author and diplomat (born 1945)
- February 13 – Oakley Hall III, American playwright (born 1950)
- February 15 – Judith Binney, New Zealand author (born 1940)
- February 16
  - Justinas Marcinkevičius, Lithuanian poet and playwright (born 1930)
  - Hans Joachim Alpers, German science fiction author (born 1943)
- February 17
  - Perry Moore, American author (born 1971)
  - Vivien Noakes, English biographer and critic (born 1937)
  - James McLure, American playwright (born 1951)
- February 18 – Victor Martinez, US poet and novelist (born 1954)
- February 19 – Max Wilk, American playwright, screenwriter and author (born 1920)
- February 25
  - Manny Fried, American playwright and actor (born 1913)
  - Aminath Faiza, Maldivian poet and writer in the Dhivehi language (born 1924)
- February 26 – Arnošt Lustig, Czech author (born 1926)
- February 28 – Netiva Ben-Yehuda, Israeli author (born 1928)
- March 2 – Thor Vilhjálmsson, Icelandic author (born 1925)
- March 3 – May Cutler, Canadian author and publisher (born 1923)
- March 5 – Alberto Granado, Argentine-born Cuban biochemist and writer (born 1922)
- March 8
  - Iraj Afshar, Iranian bibliographer and historian (born 1925)
  - Steven Kroll, American children's author (born 1941)
- March 9 – Doris Burn, American children's author and illustrator (born 1923)
- March 13 – Leo Steinberg, American art historian and critic (born 1920)
- March 14 – Giora Leshem, Israeli poet and publisher (born 1940)
- March 19 – Raymond Garlick, English-born Welsh poet and editor (born 1926)
- March 26 – Diana Wynne Jones, English children's fantasy novelist (born 1934)
- March 27 – H. R. F. Keating, English crime novelist (born 1926)
- April 2 – Paul Violi, American poet (born 1944)
- April 3 – Ulli Beier, German writer, editor and scholar (born 1922)
- April 4 – Craig Thomas, Welsh novelist (born 1942)
- April 6 – Thøger Birkeland, Danish children's writer (born 1922)
- April 10 – Stephen Watson, South African writer and critic in English (born 1954)
- April 12 – Sachin Bhowmick, Indian screenwriter (born 1930)
- April 14
  - Rosihan Anwar, Indonesian journalist (born 1922)
  - Patrick Cullinan, South African poet and biographer (born 1933)
- April 16 – William A. Rusher, American columnist and publisher (born 1923)
- April 17 – Bob Block, English comedy writer (born 1921)
- April 19 – Anne Blonstein, English poet (born 1958)
- April 20 – Madelyn Pugh, American screenwriter (born 1921)
- April 21 – W. J. Gruffydd (Elerydd), Welsh-language poet (born 1916)
- April 25 – Gonzalo Rojas, Chilean poet (born 1917)
- April 29
  - Abdul Hameed, Pakistani novelist (born 1928)
  - Joanna Russ, American science fiction author (born 1937)
- April 30
  - Richard Holmes, English military historian (born 1946)
  - Ernesto Sabato, Argentine writer (born 1911)
- May 4 – Frans Sammut, Maltese writer (born 1945)
- May 5 – Arthur Laurents, American playwright, librettist and screenwriter (born 1917)
- May 9 – Newton Thornburg, American novelist (born 1929)
- May 10 – Patrick Galvin, Irish poet and dramatist (born 1927)
- May 11 – Reach Sambath, Cambodian journalist (born 1964)
- May 13
  - Pam Gems, English playwright (born 1925)
  - Badal Sarkar, Indian dramatist (born 1925)
- May 14 – Birgitta Trotzig, Swedish novelist and poet (born 1929)
- May 15 – Martin Woodhouse, English novelist, screenwriter and inventor (born 1932)
- May 19 – William Kloefkorn, American poet (born 1932)
- May 21 – Pádraig Kennelly, Irish journalist, publisher and editor (born 1938)
- May 22 – Chidananda Dasgupta, Indian film critic (born 1921)
- May 24 – Fănuș Neagu, Romanian novelist, journalist, and short story writer (cancer, born 1932)
- May 25
  - Leonora Carrington, British-born Mexican painter and novelist (born 1917)
  - Edwin Honig, American poet and translator (born 1919)
  - Yannis Varveris, Greek poet, critic and translator (born 1955)
- May 30 – Marek Siemek, Polish philosopher and historian of philosophy (born 1942)
- June 4 – Curth Flatow, German dramatist and screenwriter (born 1920)
- June 7 – Jorge Semprún, Spanish writer and politician (born 1923)
- June 10 – Sir Patrick Leigh Fermor, English travel writer and novelist, (born 1915)
- June 13 – Burt Styler, American screenwriter (born 1925)
- June 18 – Cheryl B, American poet and spoken word artist (born 1972)
- June 21 – Robert Kroetsch, Canadian novelist and poet (car crash, born 1927)
- June 22 – Zbyněk Zeman, Czech historian (born 1928)
- June 29 – K. D. Sethna, Indian poet, writer and cultural critic (born 1904)
- July 7 – Olav Versto, Norwegian journalist and editor (drowning, born 1950)
- July 3 – Iain Blair (Emma Blair), Scottish romance novelist (born 1942)
- July 11 – Henry Carlisle, American translator, novelist and activist (born 1926)
- July 16 – Geraint Bowen, Welsh poet (born 1915)
- July 18 – Georgess McHargue, American author and poet (born 1941)
- July 20 – Blaize Clement, American mystery writer and psychologist (born 1932)
- July 22 – Ifti Nasim, Pakistani-born American poet and radio host (born 1946)
- July 27 – Agota Kristof, Hungarian novelist writing in French (born 1935)
- July 28 – Ahmed Omaid Khpalwak, Afghan journalist (killed in explosion, born c. 1958)
- July 30 – Pêr Denez, French Breton linguist and writer (born 1921)
- July 31 – Eliseo Alberto, Cuban-born Mexican novelist, essayist and journalist (born 1951)
- August 1 – Stan Barstow, English novelist (born 1928)
- August 3
  - Simona Monyová, Czech novelist (murdered, born 1967)
  - William Sleator, American science-fiction writer (born 1945)
- August 10 – Selwyn Griffith, Welsh poet (born 1928)
- August 15 – Michael Legat, English author and publisher (born 1923)
- August 17 – Michel Mohrt, French writer (born 1914)
- August 26 – Susan Fromberg Schaeffer, American novelist (born 1940)
- August 27 – N. F. Simpson, English dramatist (born 1919)
- September 9
  - Herbert Lomas, English poet (born 1924)
  - Khairy Shalaby, Egyptian novelist and dramatist (born 1938)
- September 14 – Frank Parkin, Welsh sociologist and novelist (born 1931)
- September 22
  - Cengiz Dağcı, Crimean Tatar novelist and poet writing in Turkish (born 1919)
  - Margaret Ogola, Kenyan novelist (born 1958)
- September 23 – José Miguel Varas, Chilean writer (born 1928)
- September 26 – David Zelag Goodman, American screenwriter (born 1930)
- September 27
  - David Croft, English television writer and producer (born 1922)
  - Sara Douglass, Australian fantasy author (ovarian cancer, born 1957)
- September 29 – Hella Haasse, Dutch novelist (born 1918)
- October 4 – Vittorio Curtoni, Italian science fiction writer and translator (born 1949)
- October 10 – Uno Röndahl, Swedish writer (born 1924)
- October 11 – Ewald Osers, Czech translator and poet (born 1917)
- October 12 – Lowell H. Harrison, American historian (born 1922)
- October 15 – Earl McRae, Canadian journalist (born 1942)
- October 18
  - Paul Everac, Romanian writer (born 1924)
  - Friedrich Kittler, German literary scholar and media theorist (born 1943)
- October 19
  - Kakkanadan, Indian Malayalam writer (born 1935)
  - Bohdan Osadchuk, Ukrainian historian and journalist (born 1920)
- October 21
  - Hikmet Bilâ, Turkish journalist and author (lung cancer, born 1954)
  - Tone Pavček, Slovenian author and translator (born 1928)
- October 23
  - Florence Parry Heide, American children's author (born 1919)
  - Bogdan Zakrzewski, Polish historian and researcher of Polish literature (born 1916)
- October 24 – Morio Kita (北 杜夫), Japanese novelist, essayist and psychiatrist (born 1927)
- November 3
  - H. G. Francis, German science fiction author (born 1936)
  - Morris Philipson, American novelist and publisher (born 1926)
- November 21
  - Arie van Deursen, Dutch historian (born 1931)
  - Theodore Enslin, American poet (born 1925)
  - Anne McCaffrey, American fantasy writer (born 1926)
- November 25 – Leonid Borodin, Russian novelist, journalist and Soviet dissident, (born 1938) (Russian)
- November 26 – Rashid Karim, Bangladeshi novelist (born 1925)
- November 30
  - Ana Daniel, Portuguese poet (born 1928)
  - Partap Sharma, Indian playwright (born 1939)
- December 15 – Christopher Hitchens, English journalist and commentator (esophageal cancer, born 1949)
- December 20 – Barry Reckord, Jamaican playwright (born 1926)
- December 23 – Tripuraneni Maharadhi, Indian screenwriter (born 1930)
- December 27 – Thinley Norbu, Tibetan Buddhist writer and teacher (born 1931)
- December 30 – Eleanor Ross Taylor, American poet (born 1920)
- December 31
  - Celia Dale, English fiction writer and book reviewer (born 1912
  - Penny Jordan, English romantic novelist (born 1946)

== Awards ==
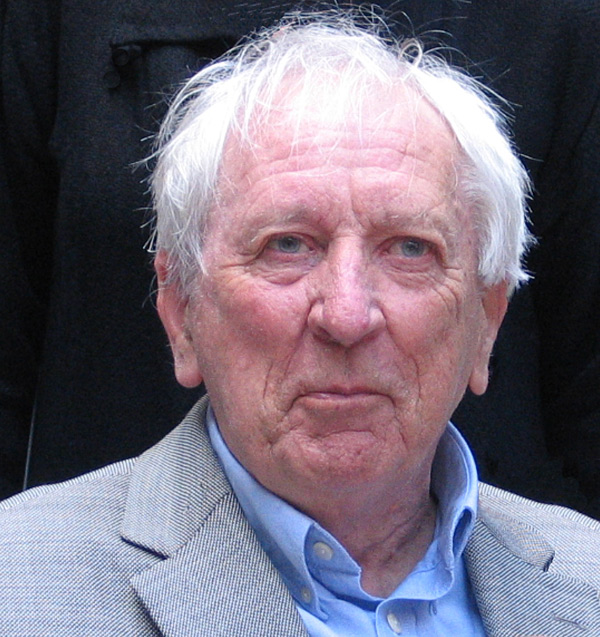
Tomas Tranströmer in 2008

- Nobel Prize in Literature: Tomas Tranströmer

=== Australia ===
- Miles Franklin Award: Kim Scott, That Deadman Dance

=== Canada ===
- Amazon.ca First Novel Award: David Bezmozgis, The Free World
- Edna Staebler Award for Creative Non-Fiction: Helen Waldstein Wilkes, Letters from the Lost
- Dayne Ogilvie Prize: Main award, Farzana Doctor; honours of distinction, Dani Couture, Matthew J. Trafford.
- Governor General's Awards: Multiple categories; see 2011 Governor General's Awards.
- Scotiabank Giller Prize: Esi Edugyan, Half-Blood Blues
- Rogers Writers' Trust Fiction Prize: Patrick deWitt, The Sisters Brothers
- Hilary Weston Writers' Trust Prize for Nonfiction: Charles Foran, Mordecai: The Life and Times
- Writers' Trust Engel/Findley Award: Wayne Johnston

=== United Kingdom ===
- Man Booker Prize: Julian Barnes, The Sense of an Ending
- Caine Prize for African Writing: NoViolet Bulawayo, "Hitting Budapest"
- David Cohen Prize: Julian Barnes
- Orange Prize for Fiction: Téa Obreht, The Tiger's Wife

=== United States ===
- Lambda Literary Awards: Multiple categories; see 2011 Lambda Literary Awards.
- National Book Award for Fiction: to Salvage the Bones by Jesmyn Ward
- National Book Critics Circle Award: to Binocular Vision: New and Selected Stories by Edith Pearlman
- PEN/Faulkner Award for Fiction: to The Collected Stories of Deborah Eisenberg by Deborah Eisenberg
- Pulitzer Prize for Fiction: Jennifer Egan, A Visit from the Goon Squad
- Whiting Awards: Fiction: Scott Blackwood, Ryan Call, Daniel Orozco, Teddy Wayne; Nonfiction: Paul Clemens; Plays: Amy Herzog; Poetry: Don Mee Choi, Eduardo C. Corral, Shane McCrae, Kerri Webster

=== Other ===
- Camões Prize: Manuel António Pina
- Europe Theatre Prize: Peter Stein
- European Book Prize: Maxim Leo, Red Love, and Anna Bikont, The Crime and the Silence
- Friedenspreis des Deutschen Buchhandels: Boualem Sansal
- International Prize for Arabic Fiction: Mohammed Achaari, The Arch and the Butterfly, and Raja'a Alem, The Doves' Necklace
- SAARC Literary Award: Ibrahim Waheed, Syed Akhtar Hussain Akhtar

== See also ==
- List of literary awards
- List of poetry awards
- 2011 in comics
- 2011 in Australian literature

== Notes ==
- Hahn, Daniel (2015). The Oxford Companion to Children's Literature (2nd ed.). Oxford. University Press. ISBN 9780198715542.
