= 2011 in poetry =

Nationality words link to articles with information on the nation's poetry or literature (for instance, Irish or France).

== Events ==
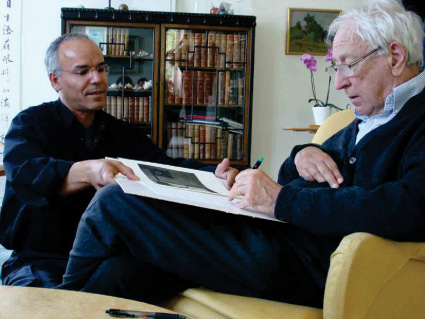
Celebrated Swedish poet Tomas Transtromer (right) signs Vecka nr.II, a reflection of his poem "Galleriet," an artist book by multi-award Iraqi-Swedish Modhir Ahmed (left)

- January 19 – Liz Lochhead becomes the second Scots Makar, the official national poet laureate of Scotland.
- April 4 – Canadian poet Christian Bök announces a significant breakthrough in his 9-year project to engineer "a life-form so that it becomes not only a durable archive for storing a poem, but also an operant machine for writing a poem". On April 3, Bök said that he
  "received confirmation from the laboratory at the University of Calgary that my poetic cipher, gene X-P13, has in fact caused E. coli to fluoresce red in our test-runs—meaning that, when implanted in the genome of this bacterium, my poem (which begins “any style of life/ is prim...”) does in fact cause the bacterium to write, in response, its own poem (which begins “the faery is rosy/ of glow...”)."
- June 12 – A poet and student, Ayat al-Ghermezi of Bahrain, is sentenced to a year in prison as part of that kingdom's crackdown on Shiite protesters calling for greater rights. Ayat was arrested on March 30 for reciting a poem critical of the government and cursing the current prime minister, Khalifa ibn Salman Al Khalifa, during the Bahraini uprising in Pearl Square, the main gathering place for demonstrators, in February 2011.
- August 9 – Announcement that Philip Levine has been named Poet Laureate Consultant in Poetry to the Library of Congress (United States Poet Laureate).
- October 6 – Swedish poet Tomas Tranströmer wins the 2011 Nobel Prize in Literature
- November 9 – The former United States Poet Laureate, Robert Hass, was participating in an Occupy movement demonstration at UC Berkeley called Occupy Cal, when he was hit in the ribs by a police officer wielding a baton. The incident occurred after his wife, poet Brenda Hillman, was shoved to the ground by a police officer, and Hass had tried to help her. He wrote about their experience in a November 19, 2011, The New York Times opinion piece entitled "Poet-Bashing Police." Also, poet Geoffrey G. O'Brien suffered broken ribs at the same demonstration.
- November 11 – Politician, academic and poet Michael D. Higgins takes office as President of Ireland.
- November 11 – The End Poem by Julian Gough is released in the Beta 1.9 version of Minecraft.
- December 6 – A memorial to Ted Hughes is unveiled in Poets' Corner of Westminster Abbey by Seamus Heaney.
- December 7 – Two British poets, Alice Oswald and John Kinsella, withdraw from the T. S. Eliot Prize in protest over the prize's sponsorship by an investment company called Arum who focus on hedge funds.

== Works published in English ==
=== Australia ===
- Tranter, John (ed.), The Best Australian Poems 2011, Black Inc. ISBN 978-1-9218-7045-3

=== Canada ===
- Michael Boughn, Cosmographia: A Post-Lucretian Faux Micro-Epic
- Kate Eichhorn, Fieldnotes, A Forensic
- Phil Hall, Killdeer
- Garry Thomas Morse, Discovery Passages
- Susan Musgrave, Origami Dove

=== India, in English ===
- Vivek Narayanan, Universal Beach, 80 pages, ingirumimusnocteetconsumimurigni (SPD, dist.), ISBN 978-1-934639-10-8

=== New Zealand ===
- Airini Beautrais Western Line, Victoria University Press

==== Poets in Best New Zealand Poems ====
Poems from these 25 poets were selected by Chris Price for Best New Zealand Poems 2010, published online this year:

- Fleur Adcock
- Hinemoana Baker
- Emma Barnes
- Sarah Jane Barnett
- Miro Bilbrough
- Jenny Bornholdt
- James Brown
- Kate Camp
- Geoff Cochrane
- Jennifer Compton
- David Eggleton
- Cliff Fell
- John Gallas
- Anna Jackson
- Lynn Jenner
- Anne Kennedy
- Anna Livesey
- Cilla McQueen
- David Mitchell
- Bill Nelson
- John Newton
- Gregory O'Brien
- Kerrin P Sharpe
- Elizabeth Smither
- Ian Wedde

=== South Africa ===
- Iain S. Thomas, I Wrote This For You, 202 pages, Central Avenue Publishing, ISBN 978-1-92676-068-1

=== United Kingdom ===
- Hal Duncan, Songs for the Devil and Death, 172 pages, Papaverua Press, ISBN 978-1-907881-04-6
- Salena Godden, Under The Pier, Nasty Little Press
- Ralph Pordzik, Pretending to See Elephants, 58 pages, Lulu Press, ISBN 978-1-4457-5568-7
- William Walker (age 97), The Poetry of Flt Lt William Walker AE, The Battle of Britain Memorial Trust
- Eoghan Walls, The Salt Harvest, 64 pages, Seren Books, ISBN 978-1-85411-549-2
- Carol Watts, Occasionals, Reality Street, 88 pp., ISBN 978-1-874400-52-3

==== Anthologies in the United Kingdom ====
- Being Human, edited by Neil Astley
- New Poetries V, edited by Michael Schmidt with Eleanor Crawforth, 264 pages, Carcanet Press, ISBN 978-1-84777-131-5

=== United States ===
- Seth Abramson, Northerners, 72 pages, New Issues Press, ISBN 978-1-930974-96-8
- Ammiel Alcalay, “neither wit nor gold” (from them), 88 pp., Ugly Duckling Presse, ISBN 978-1-933254-84-5
- Will Alexander, Compression & Purity, 100 pp., City Lights, ISBN 978-0-87286-541-9
- Rae Armantrout, Money Shot, 80 pages, Wesleyan University Press, ISBN 978-0-8195-7130-4
- Morris Berman, Counting Blessings, 44 pages, Cervena Barva Press, ISBN 978-0-5780-8091-8
- Ernesto Cardenal, The Origin of the Species and Other Poems, translated & introduced by John Lyons, foreword by Anne Waldman, 168 pp., Texas Tech University Press, ISBN 978-0-89672-689-5
- Billy Collins, Horoscopes for the Dead, 128 pages, Random House, ISBN 978-1-4000-6492-2
- William Corbett, The Whalen Poem, 64 pages, Hanging Loose Press, ISBN 978-1-934909-13-3
- Joshua Corey, Severance Songs, 84 pages, Tupelo Press, 978-1-932195-92-7
- Forrest Gander, Core Samples from the World, 96 pages, New Directions, ISBN 978-0-8112-1887-0
- Eloise Greenfield, The Great Migration: Journey to the North, 32 pages, Amistad, ISBN 978-0-06-125921-0
- Jane Hirshfield, Come, Thief, 108 pages, Knopf, ISBN 978-0-307-59542-3
- Harmony Holiday, Negro League Baseball, 104 pages, Fence Books, ISBN 978-1-934200-42-1
- Susan Howe, That This, 112 pages, New Directions, ISBN 978-0-8112-1918-1
- David Meltzer, When I Was A Poet, 150 pages, City Lights, ISBN 978-0-87286-516-7
- Anna Moschovakis, You and Three Others Are Approaching a Lake, 132 pages, Coffee House Press, ISBN 978-1-56689-250-6
- Alice Notley, Culture of One, 160 pages, Penguin, ISBN 978-0-14-311893-0
- Edward Nudelman, What Looks Like an Elephant, 116 pp., Lummox Press, ISBN 978-1-929878-91-8
- Ovid, Love Poems, Letters and Remedies of Ovid, transl. by David R. Slavitt; introd. by Michael Dirda, 384 pp., Harvard University Press, ISBN 978-0-674-05904-7
- Michael Palmer, Thread, 112 pages, New Directions, ISBN 978-0-8112-1921-1
- Ruben Quesada, Next Extinct Mammal, 62 pages, Greenhouse Review Press, ISBN 978-0-9655239-9-8
- Matthew Rohrer, Destroyer and Preserver, 96 pages, Wave, ISBN 978-1-933517-50-6
- Rabindranath Tagore, The Essential Tagore, ed. by Fakrul Alam & Radha Chakravarty, 864 pp., Belknap-Harvard, ISBN 978-0-674-05790-6
- Tyrone Williams, Pink Tie, Hooke Press,
- Elizabeth Willis, Address, 80 pages, Wesleyan, ISBN 978-0-8195-7098-7
- Dean Young, Fall Higher, Copper Canyon Press, ISBN 978-1-55659-311-6

==== Anthologies in the United States ====
- Tyler Chadwick (ed.); – Fire in the Pasture: 21st Century Mormon Poets, 546 pages. Peculiar Pages, ISBN 978-0-9817696-6-0.
- Kenneth Goldsmith (ed.); Craig Dworkin (ed.) – Against Expression: An Anthology of Conceptual Writing, 656 pages. Northwestern University Press, ISBN 978-0-8101-2711-1
- Sarah Palin; Michael Solomon (ed.) – I Hope Like Heck, 64 pages. Byliner, ISBN 978-1-61452-009-2

==== Criticism, scholarship and biography in the United States ====
- Charles Bernstein, Attack of the Difficult Poems: Essays and Inventions, 296 pages, University of Chicago Press, ISBN 978-0-226-04477-4
- Robert Duncan, The H.D. Book, 696 pages, University of California Press, ISBN 978-0-520-26075-7
- Oren Izenberg, Being Numerous: Poetry and the Ground of Social Life, 272 pages, Princeton University Press, ISBN 978-0-691-14866-3
- Christopher Nealon, The Matter of Capital: Poetry and Crisis in the American Century, 202 pages, Harvard University Press, ISBN 978-0-674-05872-9

==== Poets in The Best American Poetry 2011 ====
These poets appeared in The Best American Poetry 2011. David Lehman, general editor, and Kevin Young, guest editor (who selected the poetry):

- Elizabeth Alexander
- Sherman Alexie
- Rae Armantrout
- John Ashbery
- Julianna Baggot
- Erin Belieu
- Cara Benson
- Jaswinder Bolina
- Catherine Bowman
- Turner Cassidy
- Michael Cerelli
- Billy Collins
- Olena Kalytiak Davis
- Matthew Dickman
- Michael Dickman
- Denise Duhamel
- Cornelius Eady
- Jill Alexander Essbaum
- Alan Feldman
- Farrah Field
- Carolyn Forche
- Beckian Fritz Goldberg
- Benjamin S. Grossberg
- Jennifer Grotz
- Robert Hass
- Terrance Hayes
- K.A. Hays
- Bob Hicok
- Jane Hirshfield
- Paul Hoover
- Andrew Hudgins
- Major Jackson
- Allison Joseph
- L. S. Klatt
- Jennifer L. Knox
- Yusef Komunyakaa
- James Longenbach
- Bridget Lowe
- Maurice Manning
- Morton Marcus
- Jill McDonough
- Erika Meitner
- Paul Muldoon
- Jude Nutter
- Jeni Olin
- Eric Pankey
- Alan Michael Parker
- Catherine Pierce
- Robert Pinsky
- Katha Pollitt
- D. A. Powell
- Gretchen Steele Pratt
- James Richardson
- Anne Marie Rooney
- Mary Ruefle
- Mary Jo Salter
- James Schuyler
- Charles Simic
- Matthew Buckly Smith
- Patricia Smith
- David St. John
- Gerald Stern
- Bianca Stone
- Mark Strand
- Mary Jo Thompson
- Natasha Trethewey
- Lee Upton
- David Wagoner
- Rosanna Warren
- Rachel Wetzsteon
- Richard Wilbur
- C. K. Williams
- David Wojahn
- Charles Wright
- Stephen Yenser

== Works published in other languages ==
=== Germany ===
- Nora Bossong, Sommer vor den Mauern: Gedichte, 96 pages, Hanser, ISBN 978-3-446-23629-5
- Tom Bresemann, Berliner Fenster: Gedichte, 96 pages, Bloomsbury, ISBN 978-3-8270-0973-9
- Crauss., LAKRITZVERGIFTUNG. juicy transversions: Gedichte, 180 pages, Verlagshaus J. Frank, ISBN 978-3-940249-96-8
- Dietmar Dath, Gott ruft zurück: Gedichte, 60 pages, Connewitzer Verlagsbuchhandlung, ISBN 978-3-937799-50-6
- Synke Köhler, waldoffen: Gedichte, 76 pages, Lyrikedition 2000, ISBN 978-3-86906-180-1
- Alexander Gumz, ausrücken mit modellen: Gedichte, 88 pages, kookbooks, ISBN 978-3-937445-44-1
- Daniela Seel, ich kann diese stelle nicht wiederfinden: Gedichte, 64 pages, kookbooks, ISBN 978-3-937445-46-5
- Lutz Steinbrück, Blickdicht: Gedichte, 76 pages, Verlagshaus J. Frank, ISBN 978-3-940249-38-8
- Antony Theodore, Das Lieds meines Tanzes und der Tanz meiner Traume, 92 pages, Ventura Verlaghaus, ISBN 978-39-408531-0-3
- Mathias Traxler, You’re welcome: Gedichte/ Aufzeichnungen, 127 pages, kookbooks, ISBN 978-3-937445-45-8
- Mikael Vogel, Massenhaft Tiere: Gedichte, 100 pages, Verlagshaus J. Frank, ISBN 978-3-940249-40-1
- Florian Voß, Datenschatten Datenströme Staub: Gedichte, 80 pages, Verlagshaus J. Frank, ISBN 978-3-940249-46-3
- Matthew Zapruder, Glühend: Gedichte, a bilingual English/German edition; translated into German by Ron Winkler, 145 pages, Luxbooks, ISBN 978-3-939557-41-8
- Judith Zander, oder tau: Gedichte, 100 pages, dtv, ISBN 978-3-423-24862-4

=== Ireland ===
- Seán Ó Ríordáin, Na Dánta (Poems) ISBN 9781905560738

=== Poland ===
- Leszek Engelking, Muzeum dzieciństwa (Museum of Childhood, WBPiCAK) ISBN 978-83-62717-13-2
- Julia Hartwig, Gorzkie żale (Lenten Psalms, Wydawnictwo a5) ISBN 978-83-61298-30-4

=== Other languages ===
Bengali

- Rahman Henry, Sorrow and some other happiness. (Dukkho O Aro Kichu Ananda); Bhashachitra, Dhaka, Bangladesh. ISBN 978-984-8471-02-9, Bengali poetry
- Chandan Chowdhury, Sculpture of Crow. (kaker vascorjo); Ittadi grantho prakash, Dhaka, Bangladesh, Bengali poetry

Ukrainian

- Les Wicks, Shadows of the Read (Krok)
- "AU/UA: Contemporary Poetry of Ukraine and Australia" (Krok) Meuse Press

Urdu

- Mehr Lal Soni Zia Fatehabadi, Meri Tasveer ("My Portrait") (GBD Books, New Delhi), Urdu poetry

== Awards and honors by country ==
=== Canada awards and honors ===
- Archibald Lampman Award: Paul Tyler, A Short History of Forgetting
- Atlantic Poetry Prize: John Steffler, Lookout
- 2011 Governor General's Awards: Phil Hall, Killdeer (English); Louise Dupré, Plus haut que les flammes (French)
- Griffin Poetry Prize:
  - Canadian: Dionne Brand, Ossuaries
  - International, in the English Language: Gjertrud Schnackenberg, Heavenly Questions
  - Lifetime Recognition Award: Yves Bonnefoy
- Gerald Lampert Award: Anna Swanson, The Nights Also
- Pat Lowther Award: Evelyn Lau, Living Under Plastic
- Prix Alain-Grandbois: Carole David, Manuel de poétique à l'intention des jeunes filles
- Dorothy Livesay Poetry Prize: Stephen Collis, On the Material
- Prix Émile-Nelligan: Mahigan Lepage, Relief

=== New Zealand awards and honors ===
- New Zealand Post Book Awards:
  - Award for poetry: Kate Camp The Mirror of Simple Annihilated Souls, Victoria University Press
  - NZSA Jessie Mackay Best First Book Award for Poetry: Lynn Jenner Dear Sweet Harry, Auckland University Press

=== United Kingdom awards and honors ===
- Cholmondeley Award: Imtiaz Dharker, Michael Haslam, Lachlan Mackinnon
- Costa Award (formerly "Whitbread Awards") for poetry:
  - Shortlist:
- English Association's Fellows' Poetry Prizes:
- Eric Gregory Award (for a collection of poems by a poet under the age of 30):
- Forward Poetry Prize:
  - Best Collection:
    - Shortlist:
  - Best First Collection:
    - Shortlist:
  - Best Poem:
    - Shortlist:
- Jerwood Aldeburgh First Collection Prize for poetry:
  - Shortlist:
- Manchester Poetry Prize:
- National Poet of Wales:
- National Poetry Competition 2010:
- T. S. Eliot Prize (United Kingdom and Ireland):
  - Shortlist (announced in November 201): 2011 Short List
- The Times/Stephen Spender Prize for Poetry Translation:

=== United States awards and honors ===
- Agnes Lynch Starrett Poetry Prize: to Dore Kiesselbach for Salt Pier
- AML Award for Poetry awarded to Tyler Chadwick for editing Fire in the Pasture: Twenty-first Century Mormon Poets
- Bollingen Prize: Susan Howe – Judges: Peter Gizzi, Marjorie Perloff, Claudia Rankine
- Dwarf Stars Award: Julie Bloss Kelsey, Comet
- Kate Tufts Discovery Award: Atsuro Riley for Romey's Order
- Kingsley Tufts Poetry Award: Chase Twichell for Horses Where the Answers Should Have Been
- Lenore Marshall Poetry Prize: C.D. Wright for One With Others
- National Book Award for Poetry: Nikky Finney for Head Off & Split: Poems
- National Book Critics Circle Award for Poetry: awarded to Laura Kasischke for Space, In Chains.
- The New Criterion Poetry Prize: D.H. Tracy for Janet's Cottage
- PEN Award for Poetry in Translation: Khaled Mattawa for Adonis: Selected Poems by Adonis
- Pulitzer Prize for Poetry (United States): to Kay Ryan for The Best of It: New and Selected Poems
  - Finalists: The Common Man by Maurice Manning and Break the Glass by Jean Valentine
- Raiziss/de Palchi Translation Award: Dominic Siracusa
- Rhysling Award:
  - C. S. E. Cooney, The Sea King's Second Bride (Long Form)
  - Amal El-Mohtar, Peach-Creamed Honey (Short Form)
- Ruth Lilly Poetry Prize : David Ferry
- Wallace Stevens Award: Yusef Komunyakaa
- Whiting Awards: Don Mee Choi, Eduardo C. Corral, Shane McCrae, Kerri Webster
- Yale Younger Series: Eduardo C. Corral – Judge: Carl Phillips

==== From the Poetry Society of America ====
- Frost Medal: Charles Simic
- Shelley Memorial Award: – Judges:
- Writer Magazine/Emily Dickinson Award: – Judge:
- Lyric Poetry Award: – Judge:
- Lucille Medwick Memorial Award: – Judge: ; finalist:
- Alice Fay Di Castagnola Award: – Judge: ; finalists:
- Louise Louis/Emily F. Bourne Student Poetry Award: – Judge: ; finalists:
- George Bogin Memorial Award: – Judge:
- Robert H. Winner Memorial Award: – Judge: ; finalists:
- Cecil Hemley Memorial Award: – Judge:
- Norma Farber First Book Award: – Judge:
- William Carlos Williams Award: – Judge: ; finalists:

==== From the Poetry Society of Virginia Student Poetry Contest ====
2011 Student Poetry Contest Winners :: Category 8: Virginia Student Prize :: Judge: Dr. Kate Simpson, Winchester, VA

- 1st Place – Jake Robinson of Virginia Beach, VA for the poem "Makings of Men"
- 2nd Place – Mikal Cardine of Midland, VA for the poem "Remember"
- 3rd Place – Kira Tomlin of Front Royal, VA for the poem "Caught In Silence"
- 1st Honorable Mention – Elliott Warren of Richmond, VA for the poem "Time Does Not Heal"
- 2nd Honorable Mention – Franklin Ewing of Richmond, VA for the poem "Against Kosovel"
- 3rd Honorable Mention – Andre Aganbi of Chester, VA for the poem "Classic Scene"

2011 Student Poetry Contest Winners :: Category 7: College/University :: Judge: Bob Kelly, Newport News, VA

- 1st Place Ishaway Friestad of Norfolk, VA for the poem "Super Nova"
- 3rd Place Lauren "Wren" Brown of Springfield, VA for the poem "Spiral"

2011 Student Poetry Contest Winners :: Category 6: Grades 11 & 12 :: Judge: Nancy Powell, Hampton, VA

- 1st Place Franklin Ewing of Richmond, VA for the poem "Think"
- 2nd Place Bridget Jamison of Vienna, VA for the poem "The Dance"
- 3rd Place Stephen Wood of Richmond, VA for the poem "On The Rechristening of High Fructose Corn Syrup"

2011 Student Poetry Contest Winners :: Category 5: Grades 9 & 10:: Judge: Pete Freas, Chesapeake, VA

- 1st Place Hannah Wilson of Oak Park, IL for the poem “I came from a mother...”
- 2nd Place Hannah Srajer of Oak Park, IL for the poem "Crusade"
- 2nd Place Olivia O'Sullivan of Oak Park, IL for the poem “weekday drinking...”
- 3rd Place Natalie Richardson of Oak Park, IL for the poem “his curious fingers...”
- 3rd Place Yuliya Semibratova of Oak Park, IL for the poem “not red, nor white, nor blue...”
- 1st Honorable Mention Rory Dunn of Fredericksburg, VA for the poem "The Feeling"

2011 Student Poetry Contest Winners :: Category 4: Grades 7 & 8 :: Judge: ijil Rainbow Hawk Giver, Norfolk, VA

- 1st Place Tess Hinchman of West Bath, ME for the poem "March 15"
- 2nd Place Sam Herter of Brunswick, ME for the poem “Fears: Age 7”
- 3rd Place Lilly Richardson of Whitefield, ME for the poem “Do You Remember?”
- 1st Honorable Mention Sophia Carbonneau of Alna, ME for the poem "This Is Just To Say"
- 1st Honorable Mention Sabrina Sammel of Stafford, VA for the poem "Silence"
- 2nd Honorable Mention Morganne Elkins of Edgecomb, ME for the poem "Don"
- 2nd Honorable Mention Caleb Rinderer of Newport News, VA for the poem "Country Daybreak"
- 3rd Honorable Mention Rex Reilly of Miami Beach, FL for the poem "Chocolate"

== Deaths ==
Birth years link to the corresponding "[year] in poetry" article:

- January 5 – Malangatana Ngwenya, age 74 (born 1936), Mozambican poet and painter
- January 10 – María Elena Walsh, age 80 (born 1930), Argentine musician, poet and writer ("Manuelita la tortuga")
- January 11 – Susana Chávez, age 36 (born 1974), Mexican poet and human rights activist, strangled
- January 20
  - F. A. Nettelbeck, age 60 (born 1950), American poet
  - Reynolds Price, age 77 (born 1933), American novelist, occasional poet, and scholar of the work of John Milton
- January 23 – Novica Tadić, age 62 (born 1949), Yugoslavian poet
- January 25 – R. F. Langley, age 72 (born 1938), English poet and diarist, loosely affiliated with the Cambridge poetry scene
- February 3 – Édouard Glissant, age 82 (born 1928), French-Martiniquan poet and writer
- February 6 – Andrée Chedid, 90, Egyptian-born French poet and novelist
- February 11 – Bo Carpelan, 84, Finnish poet and author
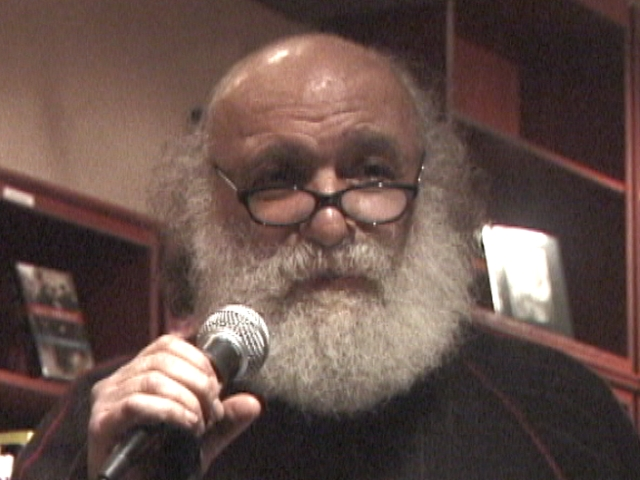
  Ira Cohen reading at Rapture Cafe NYC on Feb 3, 2007, his 72nd birthday
- February 25 – Aminath Faiza, 82, Maldivian poet and author
- February 25 – Justinas Marcinkevičius, 80, Lithuanian poet and playwright
- March 2 – John Haines, 86, American poet and educator, former poet laureate of Alaska
- April 2 – Paul Violi, 66, American poet
- April 25 – Ira Cohen, 76 (born 1935), American poet, publisher, photographer and filmmaker
- May 10 – Patrick Galvin, 83 (born 1927), Irish poet and dramatist
- May 19 – William Kloefkorn, 78 (born 1933), American poet and former "Nebraska State Poet"
- May 23 – Roberto Sosa, 81 (born 1930), Honduran poet
- May 25:
  - Edwin Honig, 91 (born 1919), American poet, critic and translator known for his English renditions of seminal works of Spanish and Portuguese literature
  - Yannis Varveris (born 1955), Greek poet, critic and translator
- May 27 – Gil Scott-Heron, 62 (born 1949), American poet, spoken-word musician and author who helped lay the groundwork for rap by fusing minimalistic percussion, political expression and spoken-word poetry

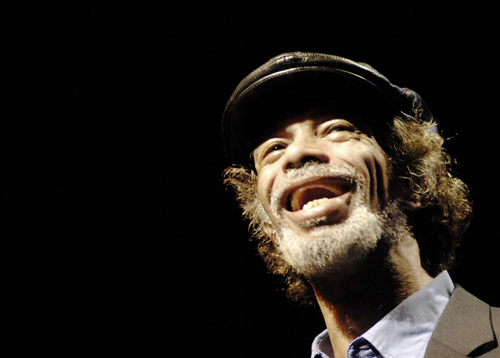
Gil Scott Heron on stage in front of a packed house at the Regency Ballroom, Friday, October 3, 2009, in San Francisco

- May 29 – Da Real One, 46, American poet (Def Poetry) gunned down in North Miami
- June 2 – Josephine Hart, 69 (born 1942), Irish-born British novelist and poetry promoter. As director of Haymarket Publishing, a founder of Gallery Poets and West End Poetry Hour
- June 21 – Robert Kroetsch, OC, 83 (born 1927), Canadian novelist, poet and non-fiction writer
- August 22 – Samuel Menashe, 85 (born 1925), American poet and the first poet to receive "The Neglected Masters Award", given by the Poetry Foundation of America, which he received in 2004
- August 24 – Seyhan Erözçelik, 49 (born 1962), Turkish poet
- August 26 – Susan Fromberg Schaeffer, 71 (born 1940), American novelist and poet, finalist for 1975 National Book Award in poetry for Granite Lady
- September 4 – Hugh Fox, 79 (born 1932), prolific American novelist and poet, a founder of the Pushcart Prize
- October 18 – Andrea Zanzotto, 90 (born 1921), Italian poet
- October 27 – Allen Mandelbaum, 85 (born 1926), American poet and translator
- November 10 – Ivan Martin Jirous, 67 (born 1944), Czech poet
- November 19 - Ruth Stone, 96 (born 1915), American poet
- November 21 – Theodore Enslin, 86 (born 1925), American poet with close ties to Cid Corman, Charles Olson, and particularly the Objectivist tradition in the U.S.
- November 24 – Andrzej Mandalian, 85 (born 1926), Polish poet
- December 14 – George Whitman, 98 (born 1913), heir to Sylvia Beach as proprietor of the Shakespeare and Company bookstore in Paris
- December 18 – Václav Havel, 75 (born 1936) was a Czech playwright, essayist, poet, dissident and politician; best known to the public as the last president of Czechoslovakia (1989–1992) and the first President of the Czech Republic (1993–2003)
- December 30 – Eleanor Ross Taylor, 91, American poet who received the 2010 Ruth Lilly Poetry Prize of $100,000 which honors poets whose "lifetime accomplishments warrant extraordinary recognition"

== See also ==
- Poetry
- List of poetry awards
