= I'll Never Get Out of This World Alive (disambiguation) =

"I'll Never Get Out of This World Alive" is a song by Hank Williams.

I'll Never Get Out of This World Alive may also refer to:

- I'll Never Get Out of This World Alive (album), a 2011 album by Steve Earle
- I'll Never Get Out of This World Alive (novel), a novel by Steve Earle
