= Department of Media and Communication =

Department of Media and Communications is the name of several university departments, including:

- Department of Media and Communication (RUPP), at the Royal University of Phnom Penh

== See also ==
- List of ministries of communications, for government departments
- Lists of universities and colleges
