= El cojo bueno =

1996 novel by Rodrigo Rey Rosa

The Good Cripple
- Author: Rodrigo Rey Rosa
- Original title: El Cojo Bueno
- Translator: Esther Allen
- Language: Spanish
- Genre: Fiction
- Publication date: 1996
- Publication place: Guatemala
- English publication date: 2004
- Media type: Print

El Cojo Bueno, translated as The Good Cripple, is a short novel by Rodrigo Rey Rosa, originally published in 1996.

== Plot summary ==
Years after being brutally kidnapped by a group of school acquaintances—having first had a toe and then one of his feet severed and sent to his father, who refused to pay the ransom—Juan Luis Luna returns from his travels abroad to confront one of the surviving perpetrators.

== Composition ==
Rey Rosa began writing The Good Cripple during a stay in Tangier. On the subject of kidnapping, a common occurrence in Guatemala, he stated during an interview:

"I myself have had first hand experience with kidnappings. My mother was abducted in 1981 and freed six months later, after some very complex negotiations. I was asked to deliver the ransom, and the way it's delivered in the novel—with this kind of treasure hunt—is taken from that experience, except for the outcome, of course."

Paul Bowles makes a brief appearance as a character in the novel.

== English translations ==
El Cojo Bueno has been translated into English by Esther Allen for New Directions in 2004.
