= Reach Sambath =

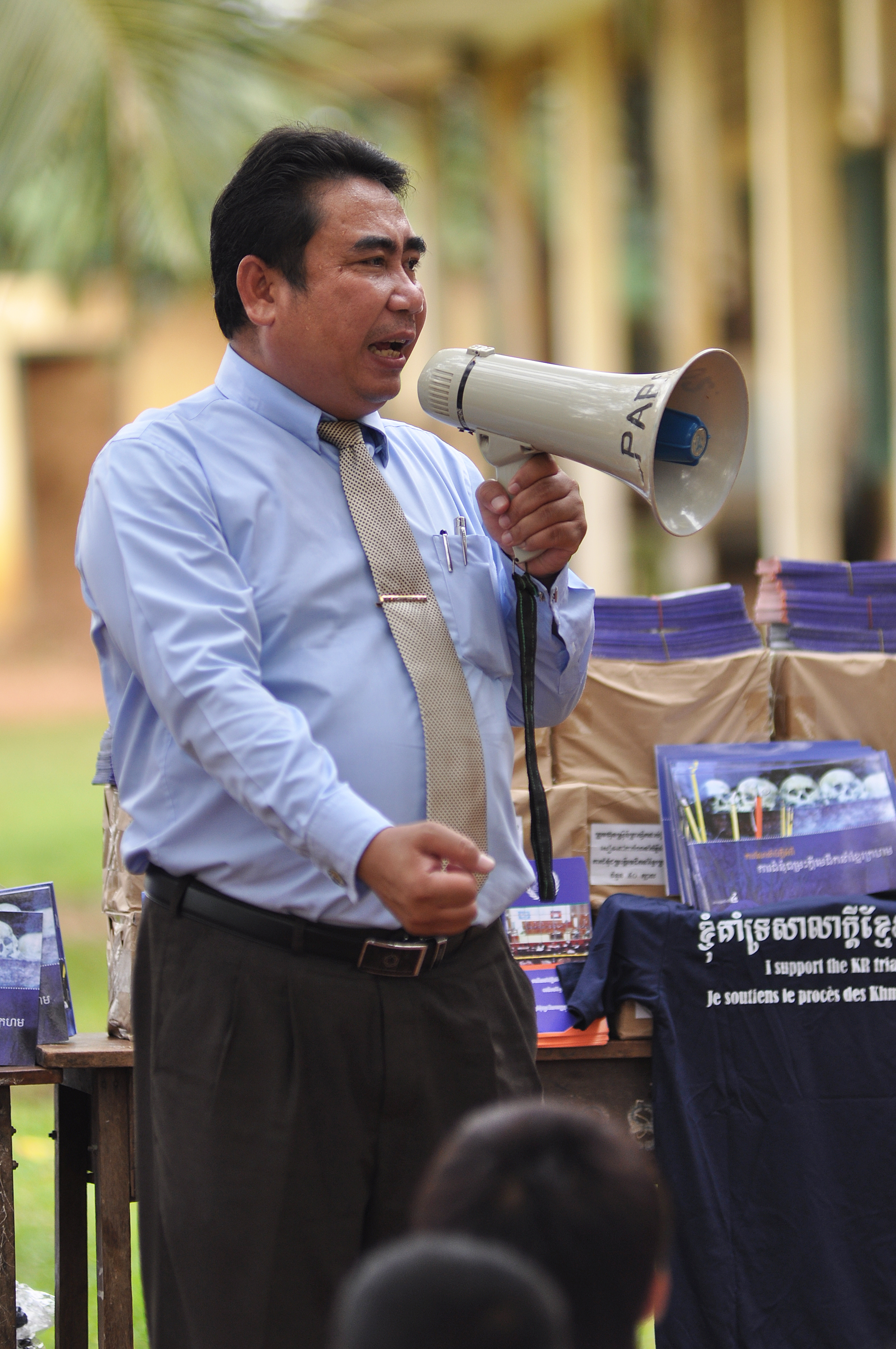
- Mr. Reach Sambath speaking to students during his Khmer Rouge Tribunal outreach work
- Born: 17 July 1964; Svay Rieng, Cambodia
- Died: 11 May 2011 (aged 47); Phnom Penh, Cambodia
- Education: Journalism Master's degree from Columbia University Graduate School of Journalism, Bachelor's Degree in Agriculture from Orissa University of Agriculture and Technology
- Occupation: Spokesperson at the Extraordinary Chambers in the Courts of Cambodia
- Spouse: Chhoy Chanthy
- Children: Champaradh, Rithvong and Samboreak
- Parent: unknown

Reach Sambath (Khmer: រាជ សម្បតិ្ត) (17 July 1964 – 11 May 2011) was a Cambodian journalist and a former spokesperson and Chief of Public Affairs of the Extraordinary Chambers in the Courts of Cambodia (ECCC), commonly known as the Khmer Rouge Tribunal, set up to try the most senior Khmer Rouge leaders from 1975 to 1979. Sambath had a master's degree in journalism from Columbia University, New York, and a career as a university lecturer at the Royal University of Phnom Penh and a reporter in Cambodia with Agence France-Presse since the 1990s.

== Biography ==
=== Early life ===
Sambath was born in Svay Rieng, Cambodia. His father was a district governor there. In 1975, at the age of 10, he lost his father and later lost his mother and three of his four brothers to the Khmer Rouge's Killing Fields. For years, he searched for any scrap of memory of his lost family, eventually retrieving an old picture of his father from a family friend taken when he was a monk for a short-time in a Buddhist pagoda. After the Khmer Rouge period, he eked out a living as a roadside ice seller and a bike taxi-driver from 1981 to 1984 to support his studies.

He attended Wat Phnom Primary School, and graduated from Sisowath High School or Lycée Sisowath, one of the most famous high schools, in 1987. In 1984, because of some English knowledge he acquired in school, he became an English teacher. During his toughest times living as an orphan, Reach Sambath stayed at a pagoda as a pagoda boy, and received support from relatives and people around him.

=== 1980s: Education ===
After graduation from high school, he was one of the first students after the Khmer Rouge reign to receive a scholarship to study agriculture in India. After the election organized by the United Nations Transitional Authority in Cambodia in 1993, Sambath pursued his studies in the field of journalism at Chulalongkorn University. He would later receive his master's degree from Columbia University Graduate School of Journalism, while on leave from Agence France-Presse.

=== Careers ===
==== As a journalist ====
After studying a bachelor's degree in agriculture in India from 1988 to 1991, Sambath returned to Cambodia and worked as a reporter for Agence-France Presse (AFP), a French news agency based in Cambodia in 1991. He worked there until 2002. In an interview with RFI, Sambath said that he did not have a strong like for his agriculture courses, but instead developed an unexpected interest in the press while he was studying in India. He was probably one of the first Cambodians to work for a foreign news agency, and he covered the nation's first post-regime election, a coup, an ongoing civil war and finally the collapse of the Khmer Rouge insurgency as well as the death of Pol Pot. He also worked as a reporter and translator for The New York Times of which the international edition is the International Herald Tribune.

==== As a journalism lecturer ====
Sambath became a journalism trainer in 1997. Since 2003, he taught journalism at the Department of Media and Communication (RUPP), the first and only journalism school at the Royal University of Phnom Penh, something he had continued to do after he joined the tribunal staff in 2006.

==== As spokesman at the Khmer Rouge Tribunal ====
In February 2006, Sambath became a Cambodian spokesman at the Extraordinary Chambers in the Courts of Cambodia (ECCC). He was also regarded by the victims of the Khmer Rouge regime as "spokesperson for the ghosts." Then, in June 2009, he was promoted to be Chief of Public Affairs of the ECCC.

As spokesman for the UN-backed genocide tribunal, his work involved answering the local and international press, and his latest work included outreach to some 4,000 students in Battambang Province over the workings of the Khmer Rouge Tribunal, the government and UN roles within it. Before he died, Sambath gave an interview to PBS NewsHour, saying: "My children didn’t know what happened to my parents, their grandparents. So, through the trial Case 002, we believe that a lot of people at their age will be able to learn more about what happened in the past."

=== Death ===
He fell in his office on Tuesday, suffering from an apparent major stroke from high blood pressure, and died on 11 May 2011, at the age of 47, at the Calmette Hospital in Phnom Penh, Cambodia. His death was called "a great loss, a big loss for the human resource of the nation" by the acting director of the journalism school.

== Achievements ==
In recognition of his contributions to the nation, the Royal Government of Cambodia awarded Sambath the “Mony Saraphoan” medal at the “Maha Sereivann” grade on May 12, 2011. Previously, in 2000, he received an award from the US-based Human Rights Watch for his life story before and after the Khmer Rouge regime.

== See also ==
- Vann Nath
- Tuol Sleng
- Chum Mey
- Torture
- John Dawson Dewhirst
- Comrade Duch
- Luke Hunt
