= The Gate Thief =

2013 novel by Orson Scott Card

- Author: Orson Scott Card
- Language: English
- Series: The Mither Mages
- Genre: Fantasy
- Publisher: Tor Books
- Publication date: March 19, 2013
- Publication place: United States
- Media type: Print (hard-cover, softcover) and Audio book
- Pages: 384
- ISBN: 978-0765326584
- Preceded by: The Lost Gate
- Followed by: Gatefather

The Gate Thief is a fantasy novel by Orson Scott Card. It is the second novel in the Mither Mages trilogy.

In this sequel to The Lost Gate, bestselling author Orson Scott Card continues his fantastic tale of the Mages of Westil who live in exile on Earth.

== Plot ==
Here on Earth, Danny North is still in high school, yet he holds in his heart and mind all the stolen "outselves" of thirteen centuries of gatemages. The Families still want to kill him if they cannot control him, and they cannot control him. He is far too powerful.

And on Westil, Wad is now nearly powerless—he lost everything to Danny in their struggle. Even if he can survive the revenge of his enemies, he still must somehow make peace with the Gatemage Daniel North.

For when Danny took that power from Loki, he also took the responsibility for the Great Gates. And when he comes face-to-face with the mages who call themselves Bel and Ishtoreth, he will come to understand just why Loki closed the gates all those centuries ago.

== See also ==
- Orson Scott Card bibliography
