= Life in 2050 =

Book by Ulrich Eberl

- Book cover for English version
- Author: Ulrich Eberl
- Language: German; English
- Publisher: Beltz & Gelberg
- Publication date: 2011
- Pages: 240
- ISBN: 978-3-407-75357-1

Life in 2050 is a 2011 futurology book by Ulrich Eberl. The book deals with the effects that climate change, peak oil and the 2000s energy crisis has on the year of the mid-21st century.

This book is intended primarily for students, young professionals, university professors and politicians.

== Summary ==
According to Eberl, computers would act as medical assistants. Robots may become household servants to the higher class as well as middle class, electric cars may develop an entire sensory system composed of several sensory organs, supercomputers may shrink down in size to the size of peas, vertical farming may allow farms to appear in large urban centers (utilizing specially made skyscrapers as energy-efficient farms), and virtual universities may exist online for everyone to access due to their relative lack of entry requirements; relegating the brick-and-mortar university as an "elitist status symbol." Trends in business, science and politics may lead the way for breathtaking innovations to take place.

China will become the biggest economy. Economic prosperity will continue in Brazil, Russia, India, and China and the N-11 countries.

Buildings may become energy traders instead of being merely energy consumers. Power plants may become reality in desert regions like the Sahara and the Mojave Desert in the Southwestern United States. Seven billion people will live in urban areas by 2050; vastly outnumbering rural people. There will be more senior citizens than young people (between the ages of 12 and 17) and children (people under the age of 12). Wind power, in addition to solar power, hydrogen and biomass may eventually replace petroleum-based products as a universal energy carrier.

Remote work may become possible from "smart apartments" that can recognize a person's face and even tell what the weather is going to be like outside. Traffic lights and stop signs may disappear by 2050 because automobiles will gain the ability to communicate with each other. According to Patrick Tucker of the World Future Society, individual automobile ownership is becoming a hassle and vehicle cooperatives may solve the issues involved in owning a single vehicle. Interconnectedness may advance to the point where people may even not have to carry a phone. The communication system would be present on just a glass sheet or something more advanced than that also. This may result in no further need for communication towers.
