= Nicolaas Vergunst =

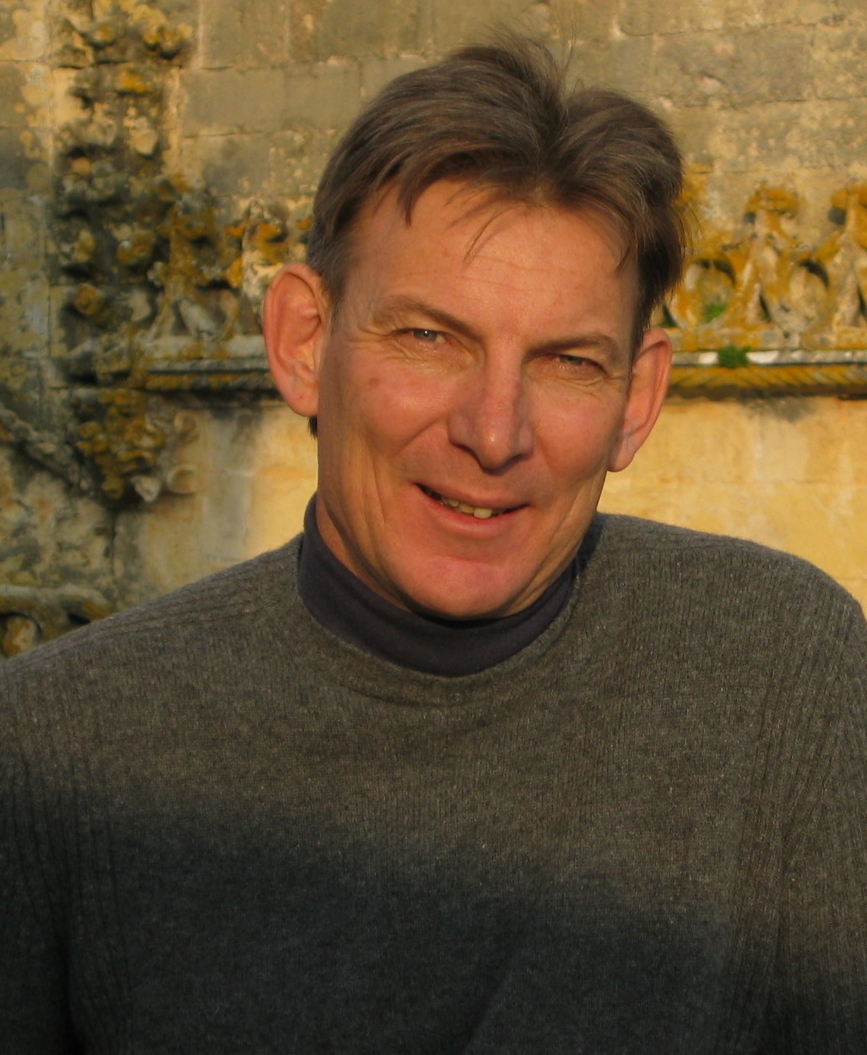
Vergunst in 2006

Nicolaas Maartin Vergunst (born 1 September 1958, in Cape Town) is the author of Knot of Stone: The Day that Changed South Africa's History. Knot of Stone is a historical murder mystery about the first recorded massacre and earliest known murder in South African history, and published in the United Kingdom and United States in 2011 by Arena Books.

== Biography ==
Nicolaas Vergunst studied fine arts and cultural history at Stellenbosch University and the University of KwaZulu-Natal. From 1988–2004 he worked at the South African National Gallery in Cape Town (later assimilated into Iziko South African Museum) where he curated Hoerikwaggo: Images of Table Mountain, an exhibition about the ever-shifting European perceptions of the South African landscape. The book produced for this exhibition had several reprints and is now a collector's item.

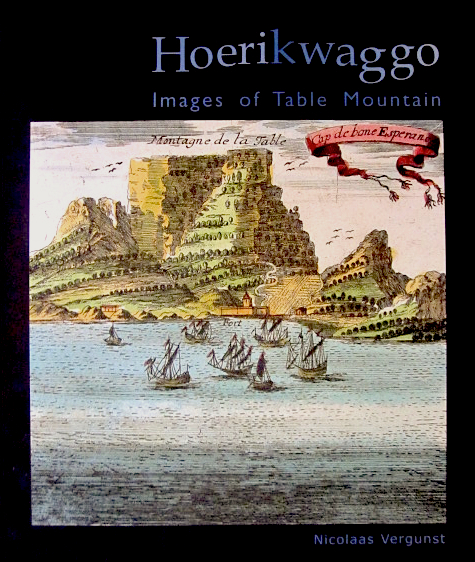
Hoerikwaggo is an old indigenous KhoiKhoi word meaning "Mountain of the Sea". It was first recorded at the Cape in 1779 and is regarded today as the original name for Table Mountain.
