= Ryan Call =

American short story writer

- Occupation: Short story writer
- Writing career
- Notable awards: Whiting Award (2011)

Ryan Call is an American short story writer. His writing has appeared in Conjunctions, The Los Angeles Review, Mid-American Review, and elsewhere. In 2011, he won a prestigious $50,000 Whiting Award for fiction after the publication of The Weather Stations. He teaches high-school English in Houston, Texas.

== Works ==
- "Our Latitude, Our Longitude". Web Conjunctions. Bard College. 7 December 2010.
- "The Artificial Stork". Conjunctions (56). Bard College. Spring 2011.

=== Books ===
- The Weather Stations. Caketrain. 2011.

== Awards ==
- 2011 Whiting Award
