= Mr Leon's Paris =

- Original French cover
- Author: Stéphane-Yves Barroux
- Original title: Le Paris de Léon
- Translator: Sarah Ardizzone
- Language: English
- Genre: illustrated fiction
- Publisher: Phoenix Yard Books
- Publication date: 2012
- Publication place: France
- Media type: Print
- Pages: 32
- ISBN: 9781907912085
- OCLC: 769547135

Mr Leon's Paris (original title Le Paris de Léon) is a children's book telling the story of a taxi driver's travels around the city of Paris. It is written and illustrated by Stéphane-Yves Barroux. The driver's travels take in the Eiffel Tower and Sacré-Cœur. The story is well illustrated in pencil by Barroux, although his "blocky, abstract comics" have been considered to not do justice to famous landmarks.

The book was originally published in France in 2011 and was skilfully translated by Sarah Ardizzone. The translation is credited as giving a "British feel with American flair" although there is difficulty with some of the original word play.
