= Uno Röndahl =

Swedish police officer and author

Per Uno Agathon Röndahl (19 September 1924 – 10 October 2011) was a Swedish police officer and author. Uno Röndahl’s writings centered on Scanian history and especially the war events taking place in the province of Skåne and in particular in the border areas between contemporary Danish Skåne/Blekinge and Swedish Småland during the period 1645-1720.

== Career ==
Uno Röndahl was born in Näsum in Villand (North-Eastern Scania). His career began in the Swedish Navy and then he became a policeman in Stockholm. Already during childhood, his interest for the history of Scania was awakened. During his time in Stockholm he enjoyed rich opportunities to visit museums, libraries and archives. This interest followed him when he later took over as a police detective in the city of Kristianstad. With research methods similar to that of a detective’s persistent curiosity, he supplemented his historical knowledge by for many years going through old documents and archives not only in Kristianstad and the university city of Lund but also in the National Archives in Copenhagen (Rigsarkivet).

The results often gave a very brutal picture of the war events during this period, particularly in the border regions between Sweden and Denmark in North-Eastern Scania. In an almost shocking way, he highlighted the difficult living conditions and suffering of the contemporary civilian population. By means of his books he was able to spread a more nuanced picture of the region's history and the daily life of the people of the era.

In 1981 he published the book "Skåneland utan förskoning ” (“Scania without mercy”) This book became a fierce criticism of the established description of the Swedish wars in the former Danish provinces of Skåne, Halland and Blekinge in the second half of the 17th century. Uno Röndahl claimed that what in Swedish history books was called "a peaceful transition from Denmark to Sweden" was not as peaceful as is often claimed.

The book "Skåneland II – På jakt efter historien” (“Scania II - In search of history"), was released in 1986. In this book Uno Röndahl discussed the consequences of depriving people of their history. He also describes in the book many of the historical figures, including those from before 1658, who had played an important role in the history of the old Danish provinces of Skåne and Halland, Blekinge.

The book "Skåneland ur det fördolda” (“Scania from the obscure") was published in 1996 and covers the often grim and tragic fates of the common civilians, often forgotten in established history books or at best are referred to as "a bunch of peasants", "snapphane" and the like.

Year 2006 the book "Herulerna, det glömda folket” (“The Herulis - the forgotten people") was released, with Uno Röndahl as a co-writer.

Uno Röndahl did not become fully recognized by the academic establishment, despite his extensive research in the primary source material. However, in later years his work has increasingly been used as reference material in different historical contexts.
