= Steven Kroll =

American writer (1941–2011)

Steven Lawrence Kroll (August 11, 1941 – March 8, 2011) was an American children's book author. He wrote 96 books, including Is Milton Missing? (1975), The Biggest Pumpkin Ever (1984), Sweet America (2000), When I Dream of Heaven (2000), Jungle Bullies (2006).

== Biography ==
Born in Manhattan, he attended the McBurney School and Harvard University, graduating with a degree in American history and literature in 1962. Prior to becoming a full-time author, he was an editor at Chatto & Windus in London and Holt, Rinehart & Winston in New York City.
