= Atomic Frontier Days =

Nonfiction book describing the history of the Hanford Site

Atomic Frontier Days: Hanford and the American West
- First edition
- Author: John M. Findlay and Bruce Hevly
- Publisher: University of Washington Press
- Publication date: 2011
- Pages: 368
- ISBN: 978-0-295-99097-2

Atomic Frontier Days: Hanford and the American West is a nonfiction book describing the history of the Hanford Site. It details the history of Hanford and the neighboring Tri-Cities region during World War II and the Cold War. A review in the Journal of American History called it "a narrative of tangled, contending motives and complex consequences that does not end happily" and noted its writing "with the broad view of western-regional as well as local and national concerns" compared to other more locally-oriented works such as On the Home Front: The Cold War Legacy of the Hanford Nuclear Site, Made in Hanford: The Bomb That Changed the World and Working on the Bomb: An Oral History of WWII Hanford.
