= The Lost Gate =

2011 novel by Orson Scott Card

- First edition book cover (Hardback)
- Author: Orson Scott Card
- Language: English
- Series: The Mither Mages
- Genre: Fantasy
- Publisher: Tor Books
- Publication date: January 4, 2011
- Publication place: United States
- Media type: Print (hard-cover, softcover) and Audio book
- Pages: 384
- ISBN: 978-0-7653-2657-7
- Followed by: The Gate Thief

The Lost Gate is a fantasy novel by Orson Scott Card, the first novel in the Mither Mages trilogy. The second novel is The Gate Thief and the third one is Gatefather.

== Overview ==
Danny North knew from early childhood that his family was different, and that he was different from them. While his cousins were learning how to create the things that commoners called fairies, ghosts, golems, trolls, werewolves, and other such miracles that were the heritage of the North family, Danny worried that he would never show a talent, never form an outself.

He grew up in the rambling old house, filled with dozens of cousins, and aunts and uncles, all ruled by his father. Their home was isolated in the mountains of western Virginia, far from town, far from schools, far from other people.

There are many secrets in the House, and many rules that Danny must follow. There is a secret library with only a few dozen books, and none of them in English — but Danny and his cousins are expected to become fluent in the language of the books. While Danny's cousins are free to create magic whenever they like, they must never do it where outsiders might see.

Unfortunately, there are some secrets kept from Danny as well. These secrets will also lead to disaster for the North family.

== Plot ==
Danny, being the oldest person in the North family not to have developed any visible powers, is forced to work as a teacher and babysitter for younger kids with more magical power than him. One day, while trying to make his cousins focus on learning about their powers, he decides to take drastic measures. Wrapping their 'clants', creatures they create by channeling their wills, in a sack, he prevents them from leaving their clant bodies or from escaping the sack. He ties them in a tree to teach them a lesson, but is confronted by his outraged family. After everyone leaves, his favourite aunt, nicer than most of the family, tells him to retrieve the girls, and while climbing the tree for the second time, and more slowly, he discovers that he has created a magical gate while climbing the tree. The gate teleports him a short distance up the tree, healing his bruises at the same time. This is a forbidden type of magic he didn't expect to have. After returning the girls' clants, freeing them, he pretends not to know about his forbidden powers, and continues with his duties, knowing he is hunted.

When Danny is thirteen, he and his family are inspected by the Argyros family, the Greeks. With them is a girl a year or so younger than Danny. The Norths try to act pathetic and weak, and later, while he is spying on the adults from both families, the twelve-year-old girl, Yllka, comes into the room and reveals him as a gatemage. While he is a Gatefather, the most powerful type, she seems to be nothing more than a Finder, who can only sense gates. When Danny escapes, he comes upon Thor, a relative, who informs him that the North family has suspected his skill, but promises not to try very hard to track Danny, while warning Danny that he should try to hide or Thor will be forced to capture him.

Afterwards, Danny goes to a local Walmart, where even though he is observed by a detective, Danny makes off with decent clothes. Danny then encounters Eric, a teenager who begs and burglarizes houses, and they beg for money and rides until they get to Washington, DC. There, Danny and Eric find a house that belongs to a man named Stone — a meadowfriend (a mage that specializes in growing flowers), Ced — a windmage who can control the wind —, and Ced's wife Lana (not a mage). Stone's talents with growing Westil flowers unconsciously leads mages to his house, where he evaluates their powers and determines if they will fit with a group of mages not associated with Families—called the Orphans. Shortly after entering, Danny is sexually assaulted by Lana, which makes Danny realize the consequences of not being able to use his gates in an emergency.

Afterwards, Danny and Eric rob a house using Danny's gates to their advantage, only to find that out of all of the houses in the area, they chose the one which had already been robbed. Inside the cellar in the house, Danny finds a family tied up and left for dead, and the father has died. Danny calls the police afterward and is yelled at by Eric for calling the police whilst robbing a house.

In order to repay Eric for taking care of him, Danny robs several houses by gating into them and passing the goods back through to Eric. The fence for the stolen goods, suspecting cops, breaks Erics ribs and attacks Danny. By manipulating his gates Danny incapacitates the fence, steals the money that they are "owed" and heals Eric. Instead of returning to Stones' house, Danny drops Eric off behind the Walmart where they met and gives Eric all the money they took from the fence.

On the advice of Stone, Danny travels to Ohio and meets Leslie and Marion Silverman, Orphans who agree to train him and help to develop his gatemagery. Leslie is a beastmage with an affinity for cows, and Marion is an earthmage able to sense large deposits of oil and coal. After several months, Danny comes to see the Silverman's as his parents and things seem to be going well until a stranger appears out of one his gates. The stranger (Victoria Van Roth, aka Veevee) is actually an Orphan gatemage, but because she can't create a gate, has never seen one and no one believes her claims. On stumbling unto one of Danny's gates in DC, she becomes obsessed and follows the chain of gates she finds until she catches up to him in Ohio. Because she has acquired a large academic library of material on gatemages, she offers to learn and study with Danny.

As Danny approaches his 16th birthday, he convinces his guardians to let him attend high school, and he picks a school close to the North family that he used to watch in Virginia (Parry McCluer High School). Veevee is listed as his aunt, she rents an apartment in Buena Vista and Danny links it via gates to her condo in Florida. On the first day of school Danny quickly befriends Laurette, Sin, Xena, Pat, Hal and Wheeler, while antagonizing the track coach Coach Lieder.

While helping Hal climb the rope in gym class, Danny inadvertently creates a series of gates throwing whoever climbs a rope a mile into the air, then landing them safely back on the ground. As the students begin to line up to "ride the rope", it becomes clear this is bad for Danny; he can't stop or close the gates, the media will pick up the story, he will be exposed to all the families and they will come hunting for him. However, after only a couple students have done the ride, the gates begin to stop working and become locked. Another gate mage is close and able to control his gates. Hoping it's Veevee, Danny nearly runs into the Greek gate mage (Yllka aka Hermia), but immediately gates away.

As Hermia pursues Danny, she teaches him how to remove his gates, lock them and Danny comes to understand by helping him she has forfeited her place with her own family. She promises to help him build his Great Gate. The ability of Gatefathers to create gates connecting Earth to Westil (the mage home world) has been missing for 1,400 years. Mages that make the trip find their powers exponentially magnified, but all the attempts to create these gates have failed since Loki stole all of them. Any Gatefather attempting it has lost their powers completely. Danny believes making the attempt is the only way he can be safe from the mage families, by controlling the access to Westil and making peace with them. By accident, when he helped Hal climb the rope he had stumbled on the process of creating a Great Gate. Gathering his friends: Stone, Veevee, Ced, Leslie, Marion and Hermia, Danny returns to the rope and creates his own Great Gate. The Gate Thief immediately attacks Danny as Leslie, Marion and Ced enter the gate. Danny is able to defeat the Gate Thief, but it leaves him paralyzed as he tries to control all the gates he has pulled from the Gate Thief.

=== Wad's Story ===
A secondary story interleaves throughout the book about a boy named Wad. In the remote part of Westil, a young man emerges from what seemed to be a man shaped tree, and stumbles around. Naked and unable (or unwilling) to speak, he is provided some food and clothes by a kind young woman. The young man makes his way to the castle in the country Iceway where he befriends a cook in the castle and is named Wad. For years, Wad is the cook's helper. He speaks to few and constantly spies on everyone, finding unexplained passages to inaccessible places in the castle. His spying allows him to thwart an attempt on the unloved queen's life, and he becomes her lover. The queen becomes pregnant and convinces the King the child (named Oath) is his. The King learns to love his wife and pulls away from his mistress and their two sons. The Queen, fearing that the mistress' illegitimate sons could challenge her own son, asks Wad to kill them. Instead of murdering them, Wad imprisons them beneath the castle. Eventually, the Queen and the King conceive their own child. Wanting her claim to the throne to be completely legitimate, the Queen kills Oath, and attempts to murder Wad, the mistress, and her children in their prisons. As Wad is saving the mistress and children, Danny makes his Great Gate, causing Wad to remember his plans as the Gate Thief. His failed attempt to eat Danny's gate leaves him with the ability to spawn only a handful of gates.

=== Conclusion ===
Danny is able to master the gates he swallowed from the Gate Thief. Leslie and Marion return successfully from Westil but Ced has remained behind. Before they can leave the high school, Danny's family attacks him to demand access to the Great Gate. The powered up Leslie and Marion have no problems defeating them; they also made it clear that they will control access to the Great Gates only if Danny is obeyed and safe.

== See also ==
- Orson Scott Card bibliography
