= I Hope Like Heck =

I Hope Like Heck: The Selected Poems of Sarah Palin
- The cover of I Hope Like Heck
- Author: Sarah Palin, Michael Solomon
- Language: English
- Genre: Light poetry
- Publisher: Byliner
- Publication date: June 21, 2011
- Publication place: United States
- Media type: E-book
- Pages: 64
- ISBN: 978-1-61452-009-2

I Hope Like Heck: The Selected Poems of Sarah Palin is a 2011 anthology of 50 found poems in emails by former Alaska governor Sarah Palin, edited by Michael Solomon. The 24,000 emails were released to the public on June 10, 2011; I Hope Like Heck was released 11 days later.

Jacob Weisberg, editor of Palinisms: The Accidental Wit and Wisdom of Sarah Palin, said of Solomon's book, "Not since Donald Rumsfeld's Pieces of Intelligence has an American politician arrived on the literary scene with such a stunningly unintentional poetic debut."

I Hope Like Heck was published by Byliner as a 64-page e-book, priced at US$1.99 for the Amazon Kindle, Barnes & Noble Nook, and mobile devices running the operating systems Android or iOS.

== Contents ==
Solomon, an executive editor of Byliner, said he examined some of the released correspondence, and after some "literary sleuthing," he "discovered ... language that was clearly intended to be poetry."

Solomon said that it took two days of reading the emails to create and compile the poems, some of which are titled, "The Truth About The Moose," "You Are All Amazing – Except Maybe for Bruce," and "Carpe Per Diem." He turned various sentences from the trove of emails into verses, forming the humorous and sometimes absurd poems.

The title for I Hope Like Heck originated from an email regarding the proposed Gravina Island Bridge, funding for which Palin hoped would be allocated by the Alaska State Legislature. The poem reads: "When asked about the Gravina Bridge / I hope like heck / Lawmakers are smart enough / To chop that out / Of the state budget / So I don't have to."

Calling Palin "Alaska's comedic bard," Solomon's introduction states: "Verse, like America, yearns to be free. Few 21st-century poets understand this better than Sarah Palin. Not since Walt Whitman first heard America singing has a writer captured the hopes and dreams of her people so effortlessly – and with so many gerunds." Subjects of the poems include moose hunting, beauty contests, Alaska politics, and tanning beds.
