= Paul Clemens (author) =

American non-fiction writer and journalist

Paul Clemens (born 1973 in Detroit) is an American non-fiction writer and journalist.

== Life ==
He was born and grew up in Detroit, which has become the subject matter for much of his work. His books include the memoir Made in Detroit and Punching Out, a book of long-form journalism about the closing of a Detroit auto plant. Made in Detroit was a New York Times Notable Book. His work has also appeared in The New York Times.

== Works ==
- Made in Detroit, Doubleday, 2005
- Punching Out, Doubleday, 2011

== Awards ==
- 2008 Guggenheim Fellowship
- 2011 Whiting Award
