= Severina (Rey Rosa) =

Novella by Rodrigo Rey Rosa

- First edition (Spanish)
- Author: Rodrigo Rey Rosa
- Original title: Severina
- Translator: Chris Andrews
- Language: Spanish
- Publisher: Alfaguara
- Media type: Print (Paperback)
- Pages: xvi, 87
- ISBN: 9780300196092

Severina is a novella by Guatemalan writer Rodrigo Rey Rosa, originally published in 2011. The work is written using the first person narrative mode and is dedicated to Beatriz Zamora.

== Plot summary ==
The story is told from the point of view of a bookseller who finds himself romantically drawn to a young woman he catches stealing books from La Entretenida, the bookstore where he works.

== English translations ==
Severina has been translated, with an introduction, into English once by Chris Andrews for Yale University Press's Margellos World Republic of Letters series.
