= Knot of Stone =

2011 novel by Nicolaas Vergunst

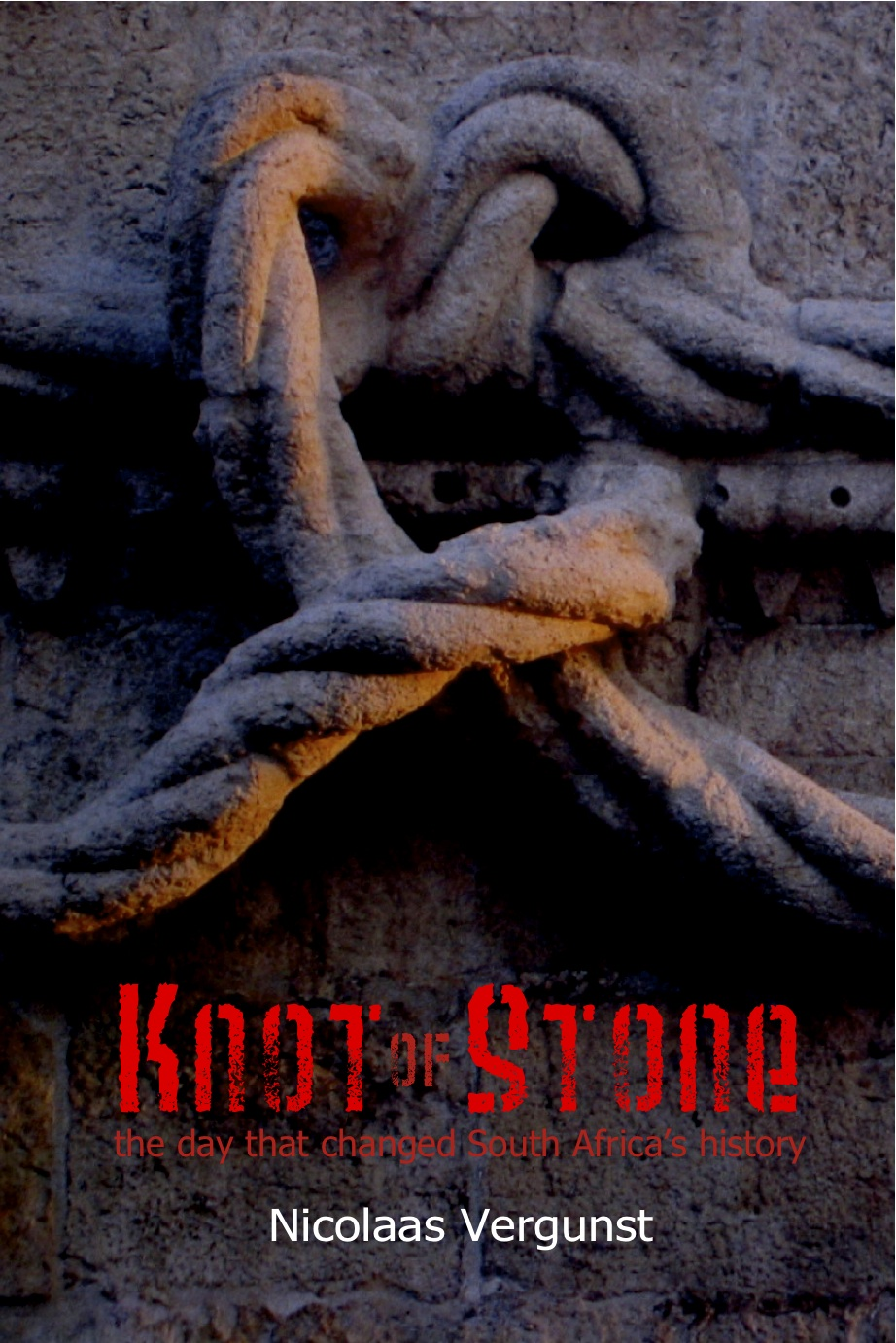
The carved sandstone knot comes from Belem Tower, an early 16thC fort at the old entrance to Lisbon harbour. Photograph by José Gomes Ferreira.

Knot of Stone: the day that changed South Africa's history is a 2011 historical murder mystery written by South African/Dutch author Nicolaas Vergunst.

== Development ==
Vergunst drew on private letters, diaries, and oral history in addition to official histories and documents.

== Plot summary ==
In 1510 the Viceroy of Portuguese India was led ashore at the Cape of Good Hope , assassinated, and hurriedly buried in a shallow grave. For the next five centuries the death of Francisco de Almeida was invariably blamed on a clan of retaliatory Khoikhoi herders. In reality, he was assassinated after a rare stone and book belonging to the Order of Santiago went missing.

Dutch historian Sonja Haas and Afrikaans archaeologist Jason Tomas, find themselves drawn together after discovering a five-century-old skeleton at the foot of Table Mountain. The two are helped by psychic Laurence Oliver. They first travel to Portugal, where some of their materials are stolen and one of their colleagues is murdered. Oliver contacts them again and points them to a dossier compiled by Walter Johannes Stein.

Their search for new evidence leads them north to ancestral burial sites, remote mountain sanctuaries, sacred springs, medieval monasteries and rare museum artefacts. Via various roadside encounters, including the revelations of a sangoma they reconstruct the past and their own identities, with differing consequences.

The book's revision of actual events departs significantly from mainstream historical writing, both in and beyond South Africa, in that it draws on dreams, oral traditions and ancestral voices.

== Reviews ==
- Harrie Salman (September 2011). "Knot of Stone: the day that changed South Africa’s history", New View.
