= I'm Feeling Lucky (book) =

2011 book by Douglas Edwards

I'm Feeling Lucky: The Confessions of Google Employee Number 59
- Author: Douglas Edwards
- Language: English
- Subject: History of Google
- Genre: Nonfiction
- Publisher: Houghton Mifflin Harcourt (US); Allen Lane (UK)
- Publication date: 12 July 2011 (US); 28 July 2011 (UK)
- Publication place: United States
- Media type: Print (Hardcover)
- Pages: 432
- ISBN: 978-0-547-41699-1
- LC Class: HD9696.8.U64 G56 2011

I'm Feeling Lucky: The Confessions of Google Employee Number 59 is a 2011 book by Douglas Edwards, who was Google's first director of marketing and brand management. The book tells his story of what it was to be on the inside during the rise of one of the most powerful internet companies from its start-up beginnings.

== Reception ==
The critical reception of I'm Feeling Lucky has been mostly positive, with the book receiving consistent praise for its treatment of life in the Googleplex.

In a starred review, Publishers Weekly describes "I'm Feeling Lucky" as: "Affectionate, compulsively readable. . . . This lively, thoughtful business memoir is more entertaining than it really has any right to be, and should be required reading for startup aficionados."

Rich Jaroslovsky for "Bloomberg News" calls the book: "[A] highly entertaining new memoir...I’m Feeling Lucky is at its best, and most hilarious, in its account of the company’s earliest days."

At The Boston Globe, Jesse Singal's review reads: "Edwards does an excellent job of telling his story with a fun, outsider-insider voice. The writing is sharp and takes full advantage of the fact that Edwards was in a unique position to gauge Google’s strengths and weaknesses, coming as he did from an "old-media’’ background...Part of what makes the book so rewarding is Edwards’s endlessly exhaustive take on his former company and its employees"

David A. Price for The Wall Street Journal writes: "Mr. Edwards succeeds in recreating a lost era of the online industry."

Josh Dzieza for The Daily Beast writes: "It's an exciting story, and it shines light on the inner workings of the fledgling Google and on the personalities of its founders."

In his 2011 online review of books, Aaron Swartz wrote:

There were many, many times in this book that I couldn’t help but wonder: How did he get away with writing this? Google apparently approved of the project and had chaperones in all his interviews, but nonetheless the book is just full of revelations and shockers that it’s hard to imagine Google would ever want to see the light of day. There are a lot of books written about Google, but this has got to be one of the best. Edwards is uniquely suited to the task: his talents as a writer allow him to craft a compelling read, his insider’s view of the very early days give him a detailed knowledge from which to tell his story, but his total lack of cultural chemistry with the rest of the Googlers allows him to find mysterious all the crazy things which they all take for granted. A fantastic read."
