= Busy Monsters =

2011 novel by William Giraldi

First edition (publ. W. W. Norton)

Busy Monsters is the debut novel of William Giraldi, released in 2011. It centers on Charles Homar, a writer whose fiancée runs away with her colleague to catch an elusive giant squid, seemingly cutting ties with him. Charles attempts to regain her affection and finds himself running into a strange cast of characters on the way.
