= Scott Miller (author) =

American author and reporter (born 1960)

- Born: Scott Donald Miller; 1960 (age 65–66); Seattle, WA
- Education: University of Cambridge
- Occupations: Author, journalist, international correspondent
- Writing career
- Subjects: American history, global trade
- Notable works: The President and the Assassin
- Website: www.scottmillerbooks.com

Scott Donald Miller (born 29 December 1960) is an American author and reporter best known for his June 2011 book, The President and the Assassin.

== Life ==
Miller holds degrees in economics and communications, and a Master of Philosophy in international relations from the University of Cambridge. He has been a correspondent for several outlets including the Wall Street Journal, Reuters, and CNBC. During nearly two decades as an international correspondent, he reported from more than twenty-five countries, primarily in Europe and Asia. He was the guest on the Daily Show with Jon Stewart on July 21, 2011.

Miller's book, 'The President and the Assassin: McKinley, Terror and Empire at the Dawn of the American Century, gives an account of the years leading up to the assassination of President William McKinley by Leon Czolgosz in September 1901. According to Miller, Czolgosz was a "seething young anarchist" who "emerged from the shadows of the underclass with murder in his heart." Miller characterized Czolgosz as believing that the "headlong rush" of the United States "toward a prominent place in a new world order had extracted a bitter price from the workingman ... and there existed no better means to set things straight than by murdering the leader of the United States."

== Bibliography ==
- The President and the Assassin: McKinley, Terror and Empire at the Dawn of the American Century, Random House, 2011.
- Agent 110: An American Spymaster and the German Resistance in World War II, 2017. On Allen Dulles' efforts to embolden the German resistance against the Third Reich.
