= Top Secret America =

Series of investigative articles

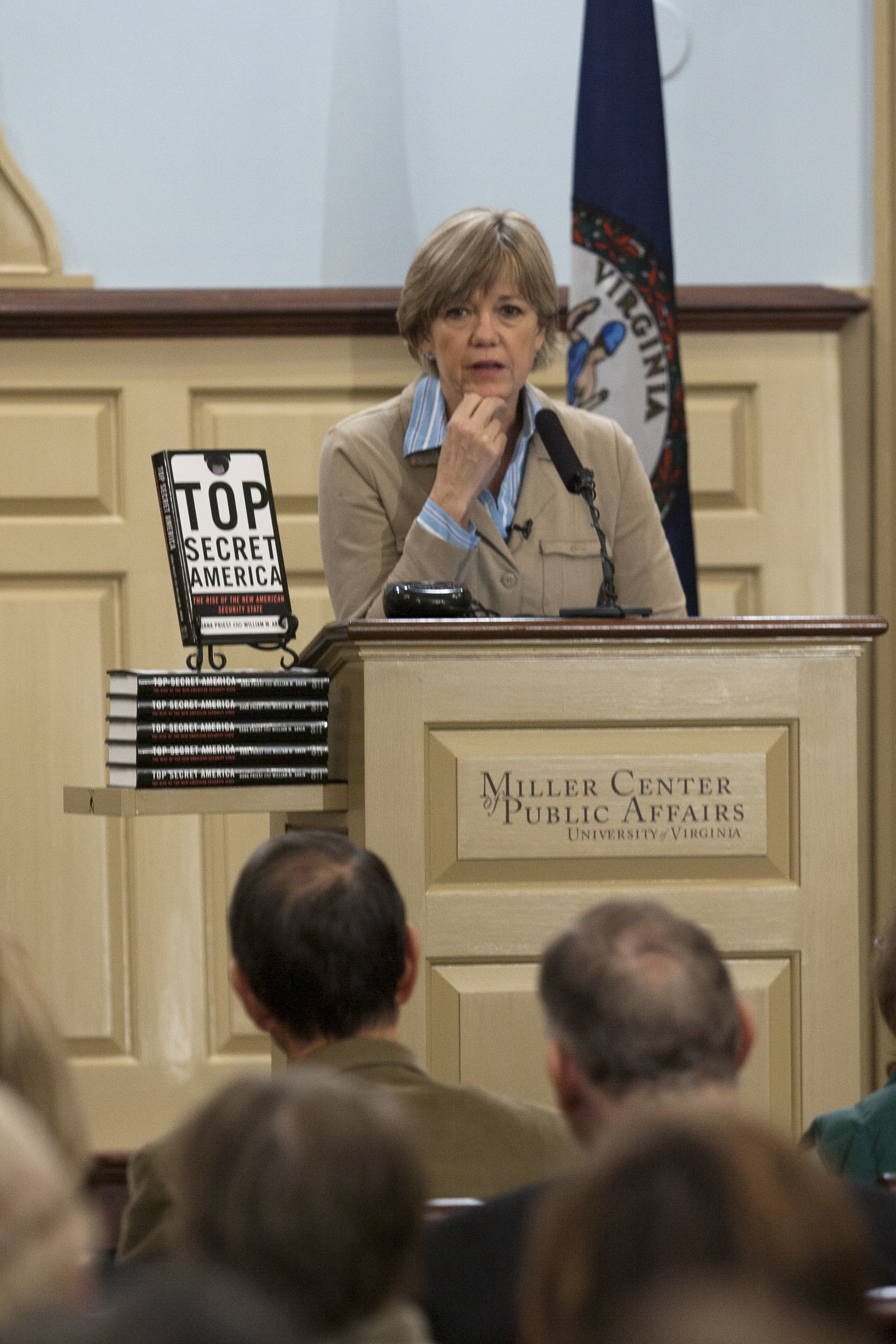
Dana Priest speaking about the Top Secret America book in 2011

Top Secret America is a series of investigative articles published on the post-9/11 growth of the United States Intelligence Community. The report was first published in The Washington Post on July 19, 2010, by Pulitzer Prize-winning author Dana Priest and William Arkin.

The three-part series, which took nearly two years to research, was prepared with the assistance of more than a dozen journalists. It focuses on the expansion of secret intelligence departments within the government, and the outsourcing of services.

An online database, as well as the articles to be published, were made available to government officials several months prior to the publication of the report. Each data point was substantiated by at least two public records. The government was requested to advise of any specific concerns, but at that time, none were offered.

The Public Broadcasting System featured Priest and Arkin's work on Top Secret America in a September 6, 2011 broadcast of the news documentary series Frontline.^{video} That same month, the book Top Secret America: The Rise of the New American Security State was published by Little, Brown and Company.

== The report ==
=== Part 1 – "A hidden world, growing beyond control" ===
Published July 19, 2010, this first installment focuses on the U.S. intelligence system's growth and redundancies. It questions its manageability, as it has become "so large, so unwieldy, and so secretive that no one knows how much money it costs, how many people it employs, how many programs exist within it, or exactly how many agencies do the same work." The report states that "An estimated 854,000 people, nearly 1.5 times as many people as live in Washington, D.C., hold top-secret security clearances."

=== Part 2 – "National Security Inc." ===
This segment, published on July 20, 2010, describes the widespread use by the U.S. of private contractors to fulfill essential intelligence functions, despite regulations prohibiting this. At present "close to 30 percent of the workforce in the intelligence agencies is contractors": 265,000 out of 854,000. "So great is the government's appetite for private contractors with top-secret clearances that there are now more than 300 companies, often nicknamed 'body shops,' that specialize in finding candidates, often for a fee that approaches $50,000 a person."

=== Part 3 – "The secrets next door" ===
Published on July 21, 2010, the third part provides accounts of individuals working within the field and focuses on the National Security Agency.

== Methodology ==
Hundreds of thousands of public records from government organizations and private-sector companies were consulted for this report, including 45 government organizations; these were broken down into 1,271 sub-units. Some 1,931 private companies were identified that engage in top-secret work for the government. For each company listed, employee data, revenue, and date of establishment were obtained from public filings, Dun & Bradstreet data, and original reporting.

== Key findings ==
- The report states that in approximately 10,000 locations across the United States, 1,271 government organizations and 1,931 private companies are employed. Their work is related to homeland security, counterterrorism, and intelligence.
- More than two-thirds of these locations "reside" in the Department of Defense, where "only a handful of senior officials—called Super Users—have the ability to even know about all the department's activities."
- An estimated 854,000 people hold top-secret security clearances.
- The publicly announced cost of the U.S. intelligence system is "$75 billion, 2½ times the size it was on Sept. 10, 2001. But the figure doesn't include many military activities or domestic counterterrorism programs."
- Since September, 2001, 33 building complexes for top-secret intelligence work are either under construction or have been built. The total area is approximately 17 million square feet, equivalent to about three Pentagons or 22 U.S. Capitol buildings.
- Analysts within the agencies publish about 50,000 intelligence reports each year.
- Every day, the National Security Agency intercepts and stores 1.7 billion phone calls, e-mails, and "other types of communications", but is able to sort only a "fraction" of these into 70 different databases.

== Reaction ==
Pentagon spokesman Col. David Lapan stated on July 20, 2010, that redundancy within the U.S. intelligence community is a "well-known" problem. He told reporters:

"We've been fighting two wars since 9/11, and a lot of that growth in the intelligence community has come as a result of needed increases in intelligence collection and those types of activities to support two wars."

White House press secretary Robert Gibbs stated:

"Well, look, I'm not going to get into some of the discussions that we had," Gibbs said. "Obviously there were some concerns. And I think the Post covered that there were some concerns, about certain data and the availability of some of that data."

Acting Director of National Intelligence, David C. Gompert about the report:

"The reporting does not reflect the Intelligence Community we know. We accept that we operate in an environment that limits the amount of information we can share. However, the fact is, the men and women of the Intelligence Community have improved our operations, thwarted attacks, and are achieving untold successes every day."

Brendan Daly, Nancy Pelosi's spokesperson said:

"The Speaker is working with the White House and her Congressional colleagues to ensure that Congress has strong, effective oversight of the intelligence community."

Senator Kit Bond (R-Mo.), ranking member of the Senate Intelligence Committee remarked:

"We can do more to keep our nation safe, and improving Congressional oversight and ensuring the top spy chief has the authority needed to streamline our intelligence community are the first steps."
