= Hemayel Martina =

Curaçaoan poet

Hemayel Michael Anthony Martina (24 October 1990 – 29 January 2011) was a Curaçaoan poet. While studying at the International School of Curaçao, the 17-year-old Martina started writing poems addressed to young people. Later, these were collected in a book, with each poem appearing side by side in both Papiamento and English. The book has two titles: Ansestro Preokupá Sosegá (Papiamento) and Worried Ancestor Rest in Peace (English). The poems explore politics, music, sports, and various personalities who have made important contributions to Martina's homeland of Curaçao.

After residing for a while in Leiden, Netherlands, and continuing his university education at Webster University in Leiden, he toured Curaçao with musician and friend Levi Silvanie. They performed at various venues combining poetry with Silvanie's music. They both organized a night of poetry and music on local television. He also toured South Africa in December 2010.

On 29 January 2011, while touring Curaçao, he died from injuries suffered in a car crash. He was buried in Curaçao.

== Bibliography ==
- 2010: Ansestro Preokupá Sosegá / Worried Ancestor Rest in Peace
