= Bogdan Zakrzewski =

Polish historian (1916–2011)

Bogdan Zakrzewski (25 September 1916 in Poznań – 23 October 2011 in Wrocław) was a Polish historian and researcher of Polish literature. He was a professor of the University of Wrocław (since 1958), editor-in-chief of Pamiętnik Literacki (1960–1998), member of the Polish Academy of Learning (since 1992).

Zakrzewski was a researcher of Polish literature of Romanticism, patriotic and revolutionary songs of 19th century, literature and folklore of Silesia.

== Notable works ==
- Mickiewicz w Wielkopolsce (1949)
- Tematy śląskie (1973)
- Fredro i Fredrusie (1974)
- Fredro z paradyzu (1976)
- Palen na cara (1979)
- Sztandar i krew (1982)
- Hajże na Soplicę (1990)
- Fredro nie tylko komediopisarz (1993)
- Dwaj wieszcze, Mickiewicz i Wernyhora (1996)
- "Natust est" Pan Tadeusz (2001)
