= William Giraldi =

American writer, critic, and journalist

William Giraldi is an American writer, critic, and journalist. In 2021, he was awarded a Guggenheim Fellowship at Boston University, where he is a Master Lecturer in the Arts & Sciences Writing Program, and an editor for the journal AGNI.

Giraldi is a contributing editor at The New Republic.

== Books ==
Novels

- Busy Monsters. WW Norton. 2011.
- Hold the Dark. WW Norton. 2014.
- About Face. WW Norton. 2022.

Literary criticism

- American Audacity: In Defense of Literary Daring. WW Norton. 2018.
