= Loreen Rice Lucas =

Canadian writer (1914–2011)

Loreen Rice Lucas (December 24, 1914 – January 29, 2011) was a Canadian writer.

== Biography ==
Loreen Rice Lucas was born and raised in Midland, Ontario, and resided in Hawkestone until her death on January 29, 2011. At the age of 80, she learned to use a computer and subsequently wrote and illustrated Outhouses & Apple Pie. Her first book was based upon recollections from her life.

She survived the 1918 flu, falling through the ice on Little Lake, the Great Depression, Hurricane Hazel and the fire that took the family livelihood. She raised eight children and cared for her elderly parents in the family home. She was one of the first women in Ontario to have her Real Estate broker's license and her insurance agent's license. During her life, she was involved in many voluntary projects including contributions to 'Kith and Kin' as part of the Oro Historical Society and worked tirelessly with others to make sure swimming lessons were available to the children of Oro. Her name is also on the plaque in the Simcoe County Museum for her contribution to its beginnings.

She shared her wit and wisdom through her writings for several publications throughout Ontario, including 'The Curious Daytripper' and 'The Orillia Packet Times'. She also created pen and ink sketches of well known buildings in Oro Township (now known as Oro-Medonte Township).

Lucas died on January 29, 2011, at the age of 96.

== Published works ==
- Outhouses & Apple Pie (1996)
- Apple Pie Philosophy (1998)
- Apple Pie Musings (2000)
- Apple Pie Wisdom (2001)
- Apple Pie: Bedtime Stories for You and Me (Apple Pie Series #5) (2003)
- The Sixth Slice of Apple Pie Scribblings (2005)

== Awards ==
- 1992: 125th Anniversary of the Confederation of Canada Medal
- 1993: Citizen of the Year, Township of Oro
- 2005: Woman of the Year, Orillia Business Women's Association
