= Ana Daniel =

Portuguese poet (1928–2011)

- Born: Maria de Lourdes d’Oliveira Canellas da Assunção Sousa; 19 May 1928; Lisbon, Portugal
- Died: 30 November 2011 (aged 83); Sintra, Portugal
- Occupations: Poet and writer
- Spouse: Fernando d’Assunção Sousa
- Parent(s): Mário Canellas and Maria Eugénia d’Oliveira Canellas

Ana Daniel (19 May 1928 – 30 November 2011), pseudonym of Maria de Lourdes d’Oliveira Canellas da Assunção Sousa, was a Portuguese poet.

== Biography ==
She was born in Lisbon, in Santa Isabel parish, in 1928. She was the daughter, along with four brothers, of Mário Canellas and Maria Eugénia d’Oliveira Canellas. She married Fernando d’Assunção Sousa in 1950 and moved from Campo de Ourique, where she had lived during her youth, to Sintra. There she raised five children and wrote most of her work. She started writing poetry at the age of 15, and soon had her work published in Portuguese newspapers and magazines, both in the continent and overseas. With her first pseudonym Ana Arlési, she was awarded several youth poetry prizes. But it was by the time she was 20 that Ana Daniel defined her literary path, gaining all the intensity that made her poetic work so remarkable.

== Her work ==
Prize National Poetry Manuscript Contest 1969, “Momento Vivo” (Edições Panorama, 1970) was her first book, a work marked by the sense of strangeness and the knowing of the irredeemable.

“Nos Olhos das Madrugadas” (Arbusto Editores, 2010), her last book, comprehends the loneliness of body and soul, made of loss and absence, and also of nostalgia, perhaps the most persistent feeling within her lyrical poetry, which is a filigree of emotions, whether of acceptance or nonconformity.
