= Morris Philipson =

Writer and publisher

Morris Harris Philipson (June 23, 1926 – November 3, 2011) was an American novelist and book publisher. Philipson was the longest-serving director in the history of the University of Chicago Press, which position he held from 1967 to 2000.

== Biography ==
Philipson was a native of New Haven, Connecticut. He graduated from Cherry Lawn School in Darien, CT (1944) and received his B.A. (1949) and M.A. (1952) from the University of Chicago. He received a Ph.D. (1959) in philosophy from Columbia University. He worked for several New York publishers, including Random House, Pantheon Books, Alfred A. Knopf, and Basic Books before coming to the University of Chicago.

At the University of Chicago Press, Philipson became known for large-scale scholarly projects such as The Lisle Letters (a six-volume collection of 16th-century correspondence by Arthur Plantagenet, 1st Viscount Lisle), The Works of Giuseppe Verdi, a four-volume translation of the Chinese classic The Journey to the West, and Jean-Paul Sartre's five-volume The Family Idiot: Gustave Flaubert, 1821-1857. At Chicago, Philipson also published trade paperback editions of works by many literary figures beginning with Isak Dinesen, and continuing with R. K. Narayan, Arthur A. Cohen, Paul Scott, Thomas Bernhard, and others. Philipson cultivated strong relationships with French and German publishers, resulting in numerous translations published by the University of Chicago Press, including works by Jacques Derrida, Paul Ricoeur, Yves Bonnefoy, and Claude Lévi-Strauss. In 1984, Philipson was awarded the Commandeur de L'Ordre des Arts et des Lettres from the French ministry of culture.

In 1982, Philipson became the first director of scholarly press to win PEN American Center's Publisher Citation. He also received the Association of American Publishers' Curtis Benjamin Award for Creative Publishing shortly before his retirement.

Philipson was the author of more than fifty articles and reviews and five novels: Bourgeois Anonymous (Vanguard, 1965; Schocken, 1983), The Wallpaper Fox (Charles Scribner's Sons, 1976), A Man in Charge (Simon & Schuster, 1979), Secret Understandings (Simon & Schuster, 1983), and Somebody Else's Life (Harper & Row, 1987).

Philipson was married for thirty-three years to Susan Philipson, an editor whom he met when they worked at Knopf, and who died in 1994. They had three children.

Philipson died on November 3, 2011, of a heart attack in Chicago.
