= Pronoun (publishing platform) =

American book publishing platform

- Parent company: Macmillan Publishers
- Predecessor: Vook
- Founded: 2009
- Country of origin: United States
- Headquarters location: New York City
- No. of employees: 11
- Official website: www.pronoun.com

Pronoun was a New York–based company that provided free book publishing, marketing, and analytics services to authors. Pronoun was launched in 2015.

Founded as Vook, the company was renamed Pronoun following acquisitions of publishing analytics platform Booklr and short-form ebook publisher Byliner. In May 2016, Pronoun was acquired by Macmillan Publishers, who discontinued publishing on the platform in 2018.

== Vook ==
Pronoun was preceded by Vook, a digital book publisher that combined text, video, and links to the internet and social media into singular applications available both online and as mobile applications. Vook was founded by serial Internet entrepreneur Bradley Inman and was announced in April 2009.

Vook was launched October 1, 2009, with four debut titles, published in partnership with Atria, an imprint of Simon & Schuster: Promises, a romance by Jude Deveraux; The 90 Second Fitness Solution, a fitness book by Pete Cerqua; Embassy, a thriller by Richard Doetsch; and Return to Beauty, a health book by Narine Nikogosian.

In January 2010 Vook raised $2.5 million in seed financing from a group of prominent Silicon Valley and New York investors including Ron Conway, Michael Maples and Kenneth Lerer. In December 2010, Vook raised $5.25 million in Series A financing. Investors in this round included VantagePoint Venture Partners and FLOODGATE.

In 2010, Vook, in partnership with NBC Universal and Perseus Books, launched JFK: 50 Days, an interactive eBook, and the Video Guide series of eBooks, among other apps and eBooks. In 2011, Vook launched several new series of titles, including TextVook (animated eBooks and apps on academic subjects) and Brief Histories (historical overviews of popular subjects enhanced with video and text), in partnership with Charles River Editors. Vook partnered with ABC News to create several enhanced eBooks, including A Modern Fairy Tale: William, Kate, and Three Generations of Royal Love, TARGET: Bin Laden – The Life and Death of Public Enemy Number One, and The Amanda Knox Story.

In 2012, Vook launched a platform for self-publishing ebook creation. The platform included management of multiple titles, a WYSIWYG editor, metadata, media management, push-button publishing to multiple ebook stores, and optional additional services such as marketing consultations and copyediting.

== Byliner ==
In 2012, The New York Times and Byliner co-published Snow Fall: The Avalanche at Tunnel Creek, by New York Times reporter John Branch. More titles at 10,000 to 20,000 words, were written, for sale at $2 or $3, for reading in a single sitting.

Byliner stories

- Amy Tan Rules for Virgins
- Ann Patchett The Getaway Car
- Buzz Bissinger After Friday Night Lights
- David Leonhardt Here's the Deal: How Washington Can Solve the Deficit and Spur Growth OCLC 837631547
- Nick Hornby Everyone's Reading Bastard
- Richard Russo Nate in Venice
- Tony Horwitz Boom (Keystone XL pipeline)

In 2014, Vook acquired Byliner, a digital imprint.

== Change to Pronoun ==
In 2015, Vook was renamed Pronoun, a self-publishing and analytics platform for authors. In May 2016, the major publishing house Macmillan bought the firm, which retained its brand.

== Discontinuance ==
In November 2017, Macmillan announced the closing of Pronoun, with no new authors or books being accepted. Legacy writers were told they could continue their account activities with already submitted materials at the time. Macmillan terminated distribution in mid-January 2018.
