= Ulrich Eberl =

German science and technology journalist (born 1962)

- Born: 1962 (age 62–63); Regensburg, Germany
- Occupation: Journalist
- Known for: Being one of the best science and technology journalists in Germany

Ulrich Eberl (born 1962 in Regensburg, Germany) is a science and technology journalist. After four years as a journalist, he took a position with Diemler from 1992 to 1995 working on their technology publications. In 1995, he took a position as Director of Siemens' worldwide innovation communications. He has also been Editor in Chief of the magazine Pictures of the Future since 2001. He is the author of several books, including 2011's Life in 2050.
