= Kerri Webster =

American poet (born 1971)

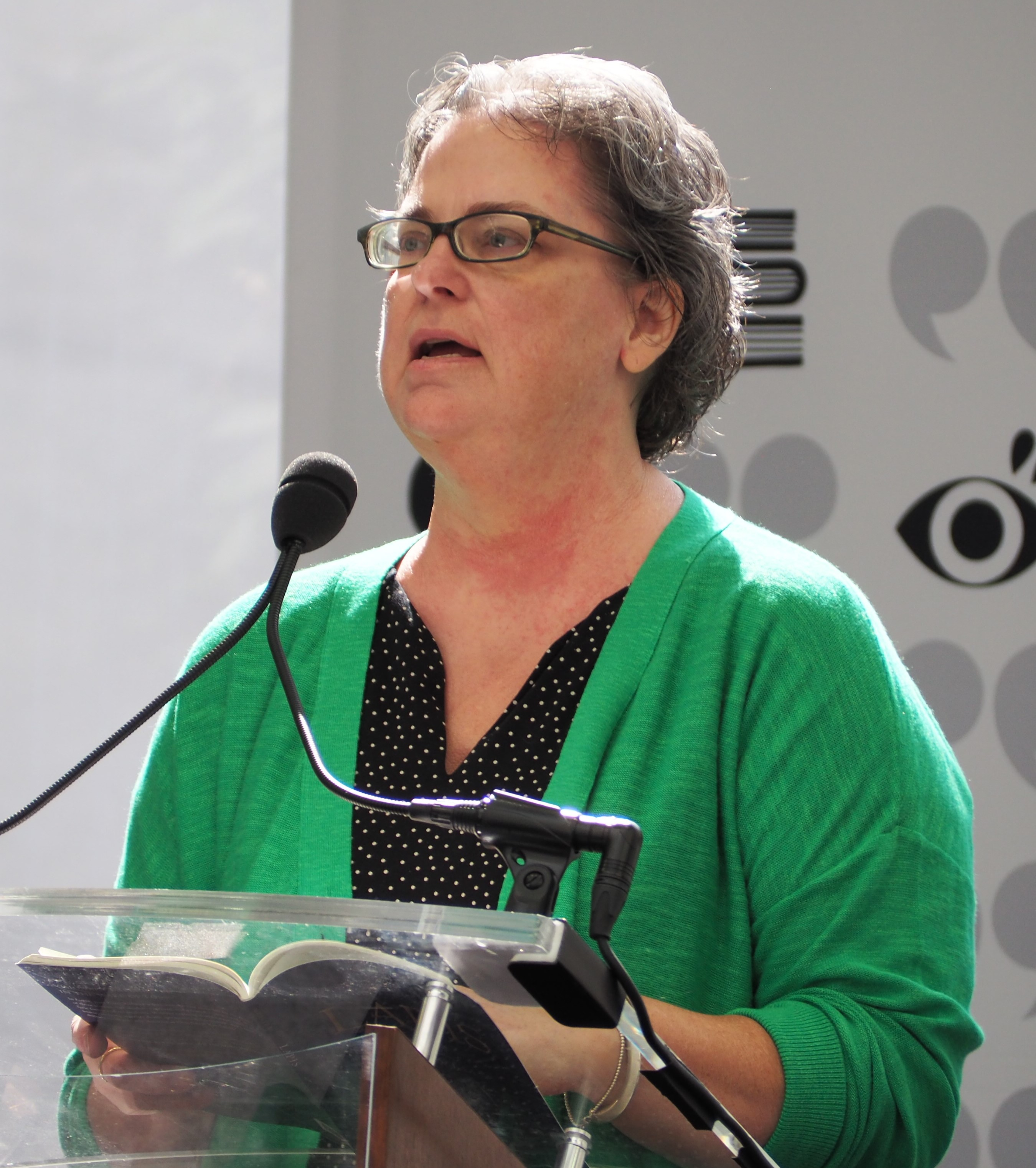
- Born: 1971 (age 54–55)
- Education: Indiana University
- Writing career
- Genre: Poetry
- Notable awards: Whiting Award

Kerri Webster (born 1971) is an American poet. She was a recipient of a 2011 Whiting Award. She currently teaches at Boise State University.

== Biography ==
Kerri Webster was born in 1971 and raised in Idaho. She is the author of four books of poetry and two chapbooks. She received her MFA from Indiana University, and was Writer in Residence in the MFA program at Washington University in St. Louis (2016-2010). For ten years, Webster worked as a Writer in the Schools, conducting weekly creative writing workshops for students. She teaches in the MFA program at Boise State University. Webster’s poems have appeared in numerous journals including American Poet, Antioch Review, At Length, Better, BOAAT, Boston Review, Denver Quarterly, Gettysburg Review, Guernica, Gulf Coast, Indiana Review, Kenyon Review, Poetry, and Washington Square Review.

== Awards ==
- Whiting Award, 2011
- Iowa Poetry Prize, Jane Mead, judge, 2011
- Lucille Medwick Award from the Poetry Society of America, Nikky Finney, judge, 2013
- Crazyhorse Lynda Hull Memorial Poetry Prize, Dean Young, judge, 2006
- Idaho Commission on the Arts Fellowships, 2004 and 2016
- Poetry Society Chapbook Fellowship, Carl Phillips, judge, 2003

== Publications ==
=== Books ===
- Lapis Wesleyan University Press, 2022. ISBN 978-0819500076
- The Trailhead Wesleyan University Press, 2018. ISBN 978-0819578112
- We Do Not Eat Our Hearts Alone, Athens, Ga: University of Georgia Press, 2005. ISBN 978-0820327730
- Grand and Arsenal, Iowa City: University of Iowa Press, 2012. ISBN 978-1609380915

=== Chapbooks ===
- Rowing Through Fog (2003). Winner of the Poetry Society of America Chapbook Fellowship, Published by the Poetry Society of America
- Psalm Project (2009). Published by Albion Books

== Reviews ==
"Kerri Webster has my favorite living ear. And certainly it’s still one of my favorites when compared to the ears of the dead. But you should read this book [The Trailhead] because the lines buoyed by the ear are so often perfect wonders. “The stranger carves a gold tunnel / through the gold book. The river faces up neon, glows and / glows. I set my glasses by the bed, walk the river path. / Show me the gold tunnel. Show me where the gold tunnel goes,” for example, seems to me as perfect a wonder as poetry allows. How could you not read a book with those lines in it?”—Shane McCrae, author of In the Language of My Captor

"Intuitive forces keep Webster’s poems moving ahead into unexpected but never gratuitous places. She can tweak the tone of a poem effortlessly at just the right moment, and her quirky vision is embodied in the most startling images."—Jane Mead, author of World of Made and Unmade

"With impeccable grace and verve, Webster doubles down on a discomfiting stereotype, claiming it powerfully as a point of view. The book opens its concerns about sexuality and power into ecopoetic and larger ethical meditations."—Cathy Wagner, author of Nervous Device

Elena Karina Byrne said of We Do Not Eat Our Hearts Alone, "With gorgeous maneuvers in language, Webster multiplies image, subject and persona, the way a scientist splits atoms."

Carl Phillips: "Taking on ‘our whole silly empire of sorrow,’ in which the holy is ever vanishing and the body—eager for more than ‘to be entered only metaphorically’—is always trembling, Webster’s poems announce an authentically original voice of astonishing intellectual and formal range, refreshing and disarming in its frankness. The vision here is fierce, intimate, and tireless in its determination to see this life squarely: ‘do the sacred miss the profane?’ Yes, Webster suggests—but if so, then it is also the case that the body is ‘an altar on which you can only lay down so much.’ Webster makes of this dilemma a meditation that ravishes with its sheer nerve and everywhere persuades by its commitment to lyric beauty, intellectual rigor, and to the power—at once rescuing and mutinous—of language itself."

Of Grand and Arsenal, Lisa Russ Spaar wrote: “Obsessed as she was in her first book with time, with fetish and wunderkammer cataloging, with the blur between the sacred and the secular, Webster carries her flood subject matter into new turf in Grand & Arsenal: the political and the erotic, the praised and the indicted, the oracular and the silent.”

Nikky Finney: "Kerri Webster’s voice is oracular, new, and legendary, full of land and weather. Grand and Arsenal rains forth like a liniment, painting the bald-faced human. Her penchant for opposites reminds us that difference is not a contrary thing but first cousin to who we are. When we read this new luminous voice we are led Upriver. This is Big poetry, a very special book where ‘the gods come down to the banks to drink."
