= Novica Tadić =

Serbian poet

Novica Tadić (Serbian Cyrillic: Новица Тадић; Smriječno, Plužine, 17 July 1949 – Belgrade, 23 January 2011) was a Serbian poet.

== Biography ==
He was born in a small village in Montenegro and spent most of his life in Belgrade.

His work was supported by many United States poets including Charles Simic, who translated Night Mail: Selected Poems, Maxine Chernoff, Paul Hoover, David Baratier and Andrei Codrescu.

== Works ==
- Presences
- Death in a Chair
- Maw
- Fiery Hen
- Foul Language
- The Object of Ridicule
- Street
- Sparrow Hawk
- Ulica i potukač, Oktoih, 1999

=== Works in English ===
- Charles Simic, Novica Tadic (1992). Night Mail: Selected Poems. Oberlin College Press. ISBN 0-932440-59-2.
- Assembly, Translators Steven Teref, Maja Teref, Host Publications, 2009

=== Further reading ===
- Charles Simic (1992). The Horse Has Six Legs: An Anthology of Serbian Poetry. Graywolf Press. ISBN 1-55597-165-2.
