= Rodrigo Rey Rosa =

Guatemalan writer (born 1958)

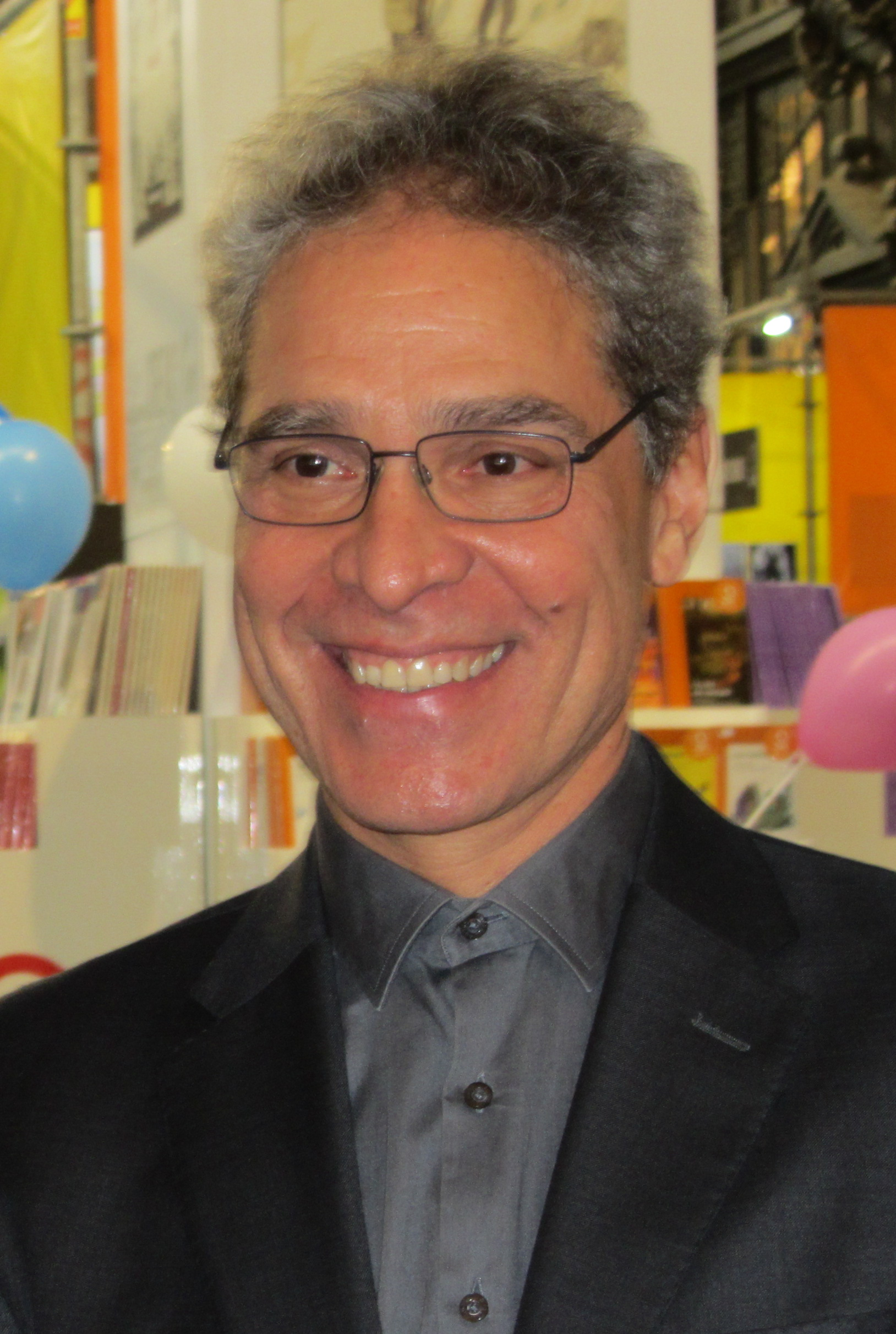
Portrait of Rodrigo Rey Rosa

Rodrigo Rey Rosa (born November 4, 1958) is a Guatemalan writer.

== Biography ==
Rey Rosa was born in Guatemala City in 1958 into a middle-class family. He recalled that in his childhood he traveled extensively with his parents throughout Mexico and Central America, as well as through Europe. It wasn't until the age of eighteen that he traveled alone, just after finishing high school, to London, Germany (where he had to work to earn money to continue his travels), and Spain.

Upon his return, he lived one further year in Guatemala before leaving (in 1979) because of unrest, and emigrated to New York. There he enrolled at the School of Visual Arts, attracted by its summer writing workshop with Paul Bowles in Tangier. Rey Rosa dropped out in 1983.

Rey Rosa has based many of his writings and stories on legends and myths that are indigenous to Latin American as well as North Africa. A number of Rey Rosa's works have been translated into English, including; The Path Doubles Back (by Paul Bowles), Dust on her Tongue, "The Pelcari Project," The Beggar's Knife, The African Shore, and Severina. Along with his longer writings, he has also written a number of short stories that have been printed in college-level text books, such as "Worlds of Fiction, Second edition" By Roberta Rubenstein and Charles R. Larson. A few of these short stories include The Proof, and The Good Cripple. In the early 1980s, Rey Rosa went to Morocco and became a literary protege of American expatriate writer Paul Bowles, who later translated several of Rey Rosa's works into English. When Bowles died in 1999, Rey Rosa became an executor of his literary estate.

Rey Rosa's early work is concise and restrained, often evoking extreme situations and emotions in ways that require the reader to infer the characters' motives or emotional reactions. This is true of the short stories in The Beggar's Knife, as well as of novels such as The Good Cripple, The African Shore and the not-yet-translated Que me maten si and Lo que soñó Sebastián. The novels written after the auto-fictional Human Matter, published in 2009, are more engaged with the social problems of Guatemala, particularly environmental and Indigenous issues. Rey Rosa announced this shift in emphasis with the publication of La cola del dragón, his only book of non-fiction, in which he criticizes the collaboration of the Guatemalan elite with foreign mining companies and drug cartels, and its complicity with the genocide of Indigenous Mayan people. The themes in Rey Rosa's recent novels are influenced by the work of his sister, the environmentalist Magalí Rey Rosa, and by Rey Rosa's friendships with Indigenous Mayan intellectuals.

== Feature films ==
Along with writing novels and short stories, Rey Rosa has created and directed a number of feature films. His first film was "What Sebastian Dreamt," which runs 83 minutes long and was based on his own novel. It premièred at the Sundance Film Festival in Park City, Utah in 2004 and has also been shown at the Berlin Film Festival. Because of his works in literature and film, Rey Rosa won Guatemala's National Prize in Literature named after Miguel Asturias who won the Nobel Prize in Literature in 1967. Refusing to accept the cash prize, Rey Rosa used the money to establish the B'atz' Literature Prize for the best work of literature written in an Indigenous language.

== Awards and honors ==
- 2004 Miguel Ángel Asturias National Prize in Literature
- 2013 Best Foreign Book Prize, China, for Los sordos.
- 2014 Best Translated Book Award, one of two runners-up for The African Shore, translated from the Spanish by Jeffrey Gray
- 2015 Premio José Donoso, Chile, for his life's work.

== Works ==
- 1986 El cuchillo del mendigo (The Beggar's Knife)
- 1991 Cárcel de árboles (The Pelicari Project)
- 1992 Cárcel de árboles. El salvador de buques
- 1993 El salvador de buques
- 1994 Lo que soñó Sebastián
- 1996 Con cinco barajas
- 1996 El cojo bueno (The Good Cripple)
- 1997 Que me maten si…
- 1998 Ningún lugar sagrado
- 1999 La orilla africana (The African Shore)
- 2001 Piedras encantadas
- 2001 El tren a Travancore
- 2006 Caballeriza
- 2007 Otro zoo
- 2008 Siempre juntos y otros cuentos
- 2009 El material humano (Human Matter)
- 2011 Severina
- 2012 Los sordos
- 2014 La cola del dragón: no ficciones
- 2014 1986. Cuentos completos
- 2014 Otro zoo (Some Other Zoo)
- 2016 Tres novelas exóticas
- 2016 Fábula asiática (Chaos: A Fable)
- 2018 El país de Toó (The Country of Toó)
- 2020 Carta de un ateo guatemalteco al Santo Padre
- 2024 Metempsicosis

Rey Rosa's works have been translated into fifteen languages, including English, Italian, German, Dutch, Portuguese, and Japanese.
