= I'll Never Get Out of This World Alive (novel) =

Steve Earle's debut novel inspired by music

- Author: Steve Earle
- Publisher: Houghton Mifflin Harcourt
- Publication date: May 12, 2011
- Pages: 256
- ISBN: 978-0-618-82096-2

I'll Never Get Out of This World Alive is Steve Earle's first novel, entitled after a Hank Williams song; Earle released an album of the same name, also in 2011.

It was published the spring of 2011. The novel is set in San Antonio, Texas in 1963, and tells the story of a defrocked doctor and morphine addict. The doctor makes a living by performing illegal abortions and is haunted by the ghost of Hank Williams, with whom he was traveling when Williams died of an overdose. The novel is published by Houghton Mifflin Harcourt.
