= Yannis Varveris =

Greek poet, critic and translator

- Born: 1955; Athens, Greece
- Died: 25 May 2011 (aged 55–56); Athens, Greece
- Occupations: poet, critic, translator
- Writing career
- Period: 1975–2011

Yannis Varveris (Greek: Γιάννης Βαρβέρης; 1955 – 25 May 2011) was a Greek poet, critic and translator.

Varveris was born and died in Athens. He read Law at the University of Athens. His first collection of poems was published in 1975. He belongs to the so-called Genia tou 70, which is a literary term referring to Greek authors who began publishing their work during the 1970s, especially towards the end of the Greek military junta of 1967-1974 and at the first years of the Metapolitefsi. He has been awarded the State Book Prize for Criticism in 1996 for his book Κρίση του θεάτρου Γ΄ (1976–1984) and the Cavafy prize (2001) and the poetry prize of literary journal Diavazo (2002) for his poetry collection Στα ξένα.

== Works ==
=== Poetry ===
- Έν φαντασία και λόγω (In Imagination and Word), 1975
- Το ράμφος (The Beak), 1978
- Αναπήρων Πολέμου (Disabled Veterans), 1982
- Ο θάνατος το στρώνει (Death Spread It Around), 1986
- Πιάνο βυθού (Piano of the Deep), 1991
- Ο κύριος Φογκ (Mister Fog), 1993
- Άκυρο θαύμα (Miracle Null and Void), 1996
- Ποιήματα 1975-1996 (Poems 1975-1996), 2000
- Στα ξένα (Abroad), 2001
- Πεταμένα λεφτά (Wasted money), 2005
- Ο άνθρωπος μόνος (The man alone), 2009
- Βαθέος γήρατος (Of old age), 2011

=== Selected essays and criticism ===
- Κρίση του θεάτρου (1976–1984) (Theater Reviews 1, 1976–1984), 1985
- Κρίση του θεάτρου Β΄ (1976–1984) (Theater Reviews 2, 1976–1984), 1991
- Κρίση του θεάτρου Γ΄ (1976–1984) (Theater Reviews 3, 1976–1984), 1995
- Σωσίβια λέμβος (Lifeboat), 1999
- Κρίση του θεάτρου Δ΄ - κείμενα θεατρικής κριτικής 1994-2003 (Theater Reviews 4, 1994–2003), 2004
