= Department of Media and Communication (RUPP) =

- ដេប៉ាតឺម៉ង់ប្រព័ន្ធផ្សព្វផ្សាយនិងសារគមនាគមន៏
- Motto: We Make Marks!
- Type: Public
- Established: 2001
- Affiliations: Royal University of Phnom Penh
- Director: Ung Buny
- Administrative staff: 2
- Students: About 300 in BA
- Location: Phnom Penh, Cambodia; 42°22′02″N 71°07′21″W
- Campus: RUPP, Russian Federation Blvd., Phnom Penh, Cambodia 12156
- Website: dmc-cci.edu.kh

The Department of Media and Communication (DMC; Khmer: ដេប៉ាតឺម៉ង់ប្រព័ន្ធផ្សព្វផ្សាយនិងសារគមនាគមន៏) was established in 2001, under the Royal University of Phnom Penh, primarily as an academic training ground for journalists and communication practitioners. Since its inception, DMC has received funding from Konrad Adenauer Foundation and technical support from German Development Service (DED), German Academic Exchange Program (DAAD), Ohio University, Mittweida University, University of Hamburg, Ateneo de Manila University, and DW.

== History ==
The DMC is the first institution in Cambodia that provides a bachelor's degree in Media Management. It was founded under the Royal University of Phnom Penh, primarily as an academic training ground for journalists and communication practitioners. So far it has received funding from Konrad Adenauer Foundation based in Phnom Penh and technical support from German Development Service (DED), German Academic Exchange Service (DAAD).

It was first known as Cambodian Communication Institute established in 1994 with support from UNESCO and the Danish Government and initially located within the Ministry of Information compound. CCI was integrated into the DMC in 2002 as part of an agreement between the Cambodian Government and UNESCO which provided assistance to CCI with equipment, techniques and finance.

== BA program ==
The DMC provides the graduate from this department with the Bachelor of Art in Media Management. The degree is the only one that the DMC offers, only available as a scholarship. For now, Cambodian students cannot pay to study this major and have to pass entrance tests before accepted. Successful candidates are required to pay a mandatory contribution fee, 110US$ currently. Since 2001, it has produced a few hundred graduates who are now working as print and radio journalists, Public Relations officers, Communication officers, media consultants, TV program director and many more media-related jobs.

== Student life ==
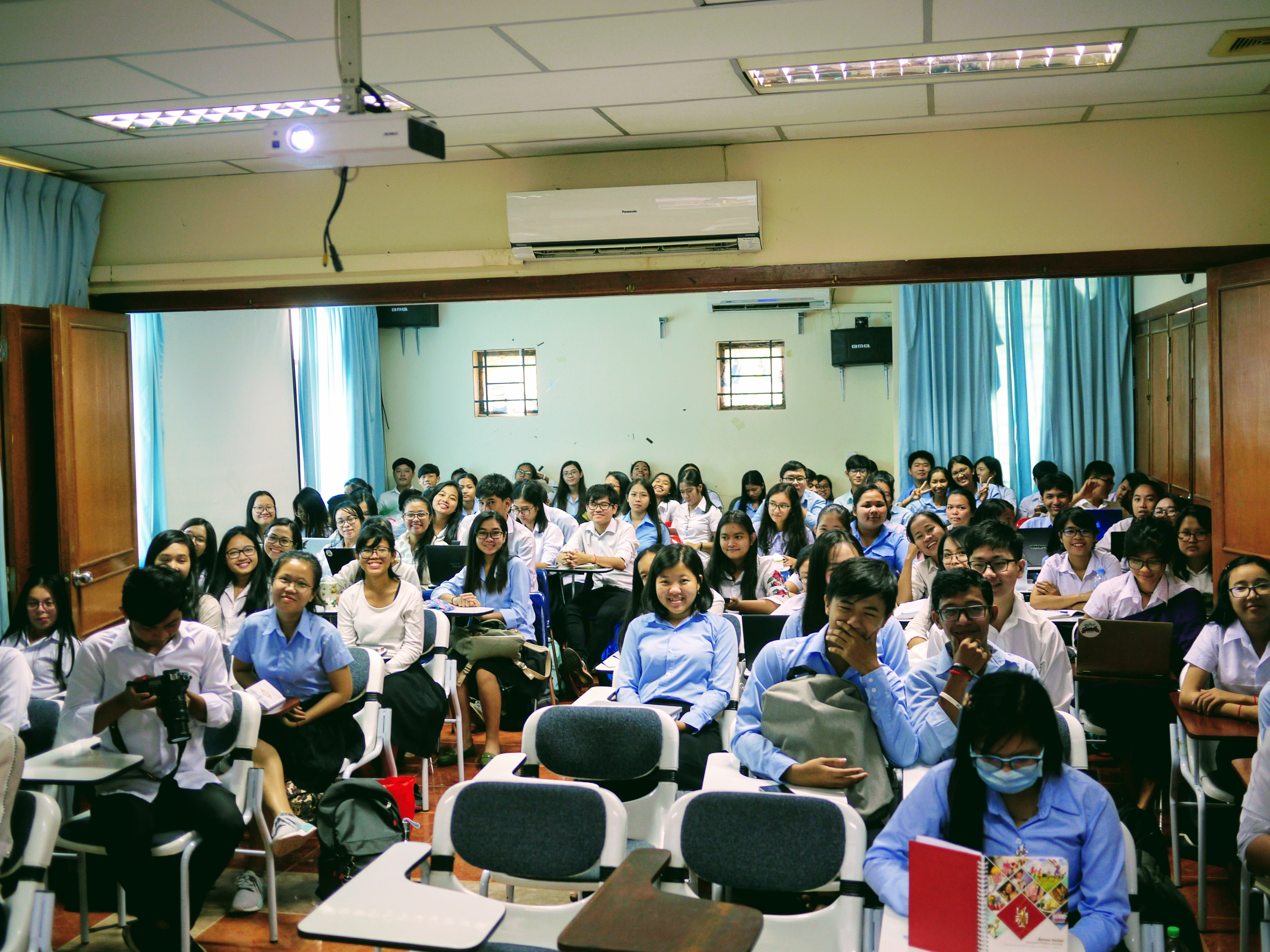
DMC students at a Wikipedia Workshop at Guest Lecture Hall on 25 May 2018.

Attendance is considered mandatory for many of the classes, and students have to attend classes regularly. Lessons are conducted in more English than Khmer, except Khmer studies, history and psychology while major assignments, tests and especially the theses are all conducted and written in English. The decision to choose English as a medium language for teaching in this department is to familiarize students with the international learning environment as well as the professional working environment.

== Current Project ==
The DMC itself has received an 18-month grant for a research project on the perception and applications of the Internet for knowledge building among students.

== Notes ==
- About DMC
- FAQs
