= Eduardo C. Corral =

American English professor and poet

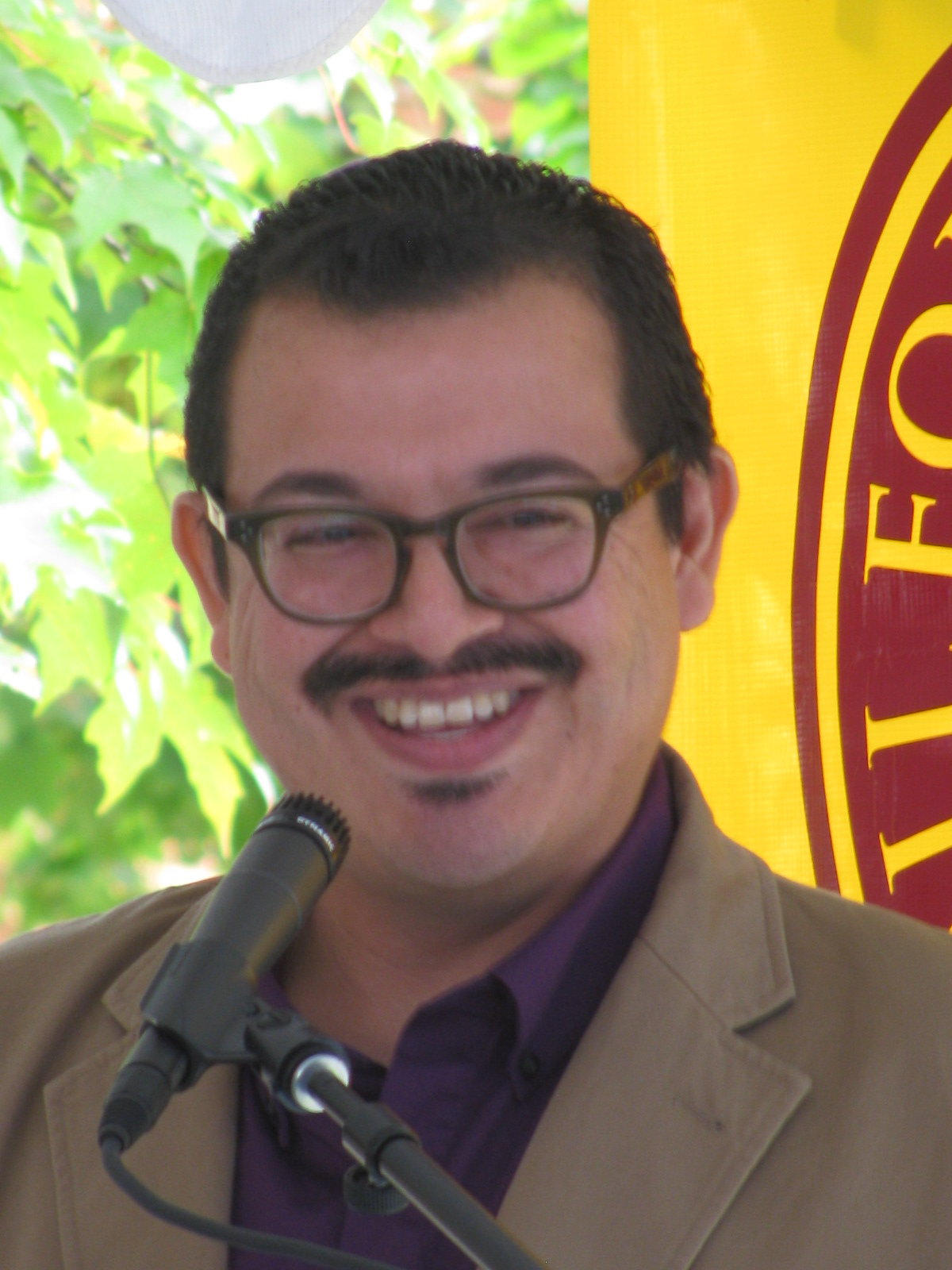
- Eduardo Corral at 2013 Fall for the Book
- Born: February 25, 1973 (age 53); Casa Grande, Arizona
- Education: Arizona State University; Iowa Writer's Workshop
- Occupation: Associate Professor of English at Washington University in St. Louis
- Writing career
- Language: English, Spanish
- Genre: Poetry
- Notable awards: Yale Younger Series Poets; Whiting Award

Eduardo C. Corral is an American poet and Associate Professor of English at Washington University in St. Louis. His first collection, Slow Lightning, published by Yale University Press, was the winner of the 2011 Yale Younger Series Poets award, making him the first Latino recipient of this prize. His 2020 work, Guillotine, was awarded the 2021 Lambda Literary Award for gay poetry and was longlisted for the 2020 National Book Award for Poetry.

== Personal life ==
Corral was born in Casa Grande, Arizona to Higinio and Socorro Corral, on February 25, 1973.

He is an Associate Professor of English at Washington University in St. Louis.

== Career ==
Corral studied Chicano studies at Arizona State University. He received his Masters in Fine Arts from the Iowa Writer's Workshop. Corral was also a founding fellow of the CantoMundo Writers Conference. He is a featured faculty member at the 2018 Poetry Seminar at The Frost Place in Franconia, NH.

His poems have been published in various journals including Black Warrior Review, Beloit Poetry Journal, Colorado Review, Indiana Review, Meridian, MiPOesias, and The Nation.

His collection "Slow Lightning" was chosen by Carl Phillips for the prestigious Yale Younger Series Poets award. Corral is the first Latino poet chosen for the prize. He has cited Robert Hayden, Federico García Lorca, C.D. Wright, and José Montoya as influences.

== Slow Lightning (Yale University Press, 2012) ==
Corral is intentional and careful when writing. He's filled several notebooks, which he has saved, when writing his first collection.

== Awards/Fellowships ==
- Discovery/The Nation Award, 2005
- New Millennium Writings Award
- Whiting Award, 2011
- Yale Younger Series Poets, 2011
- Yaddo Fellowship
- MacDowell Colony Fellowship
- Olive B. O'Connor Fellowship, 2009
- Lambda Literary Award for Gay Poetry, 2021

== Publications ==
Poetry Collections

- Slow Lightning, Yale University Press, 2012. ISBN 9780300178920, OCLC 759174237
- Guillotine, Graywolf Press, 2020. ISBN 978-1-64445-030-7

== See also ==
- External audio
  - Eduardo C. Corral and Carmen Calatayud, The Poet and the Poem 2024-25 Series
  List of Mexican American writers
- List of CantoMundo Former Fellows

== Sources ==
- "Poetry opened doors wide for Eduardo Corral" by Richard Ruelas, Arizona Republic, November 26, 2011.
