= Astral =

Astral may refer to:

== Concepts of the non-physical ==
- Astral body, a subtle body posited by many religious philosophers
- Astral journey (or astral trip), the same as having an out-of-body experience
- Astral plane (AKA astral world), a plane of existence postulated by classical (particularly neo-Platonic), medieval, oriental and esoteric philosophies and mystery religions
- Astral projection, a controversial interpretation of out-of-body experiences
- A ghost or spirit

== Entertainment ==
- Astral, a Magic: The Gathering gaming set
- Astral (band), a dream pop band
- Astral (film), a British horror film
- The Astral (novel), a book by Kate Christensen
- Astral (wrestler) (born 1989), Mexican Mini-Estrella professional wrestler
- Astral Weeks, a 1968 album by Van Morrison
- Astral, a character in the anime and manga series Yu-Gi-Oh! Zexal
- Princess Astral, lead character in the cancelled sitcom The Other Kingdom

== Companies ==
- Astral Aviation, a cargo airline based in Nairobi, Kenya
- Astral Media, a Canadian media corporation
- Astral Telecom, a Romanian company
- Astral Tequila, a tequila owned by Diageo
- Astral Oil Works, American producers of Astral Oil

== Other ==
- Astral Apartments, a historic apartment building in Brooklyn, New York
- Astral character, a Unicode concept
- Astral microtubules, a sub population of microtubules
- Astral propagation model a US Navy underwater sound propagation loss model
- Astral (shipentine), an American ship built in 1900
- Astral (1923 automobile), a British car of the 1920s

== See also ==
- Astralwerks, an American-based record label
- Astro (disambiguation)
