= Acme (shipentine) =

American tall ship

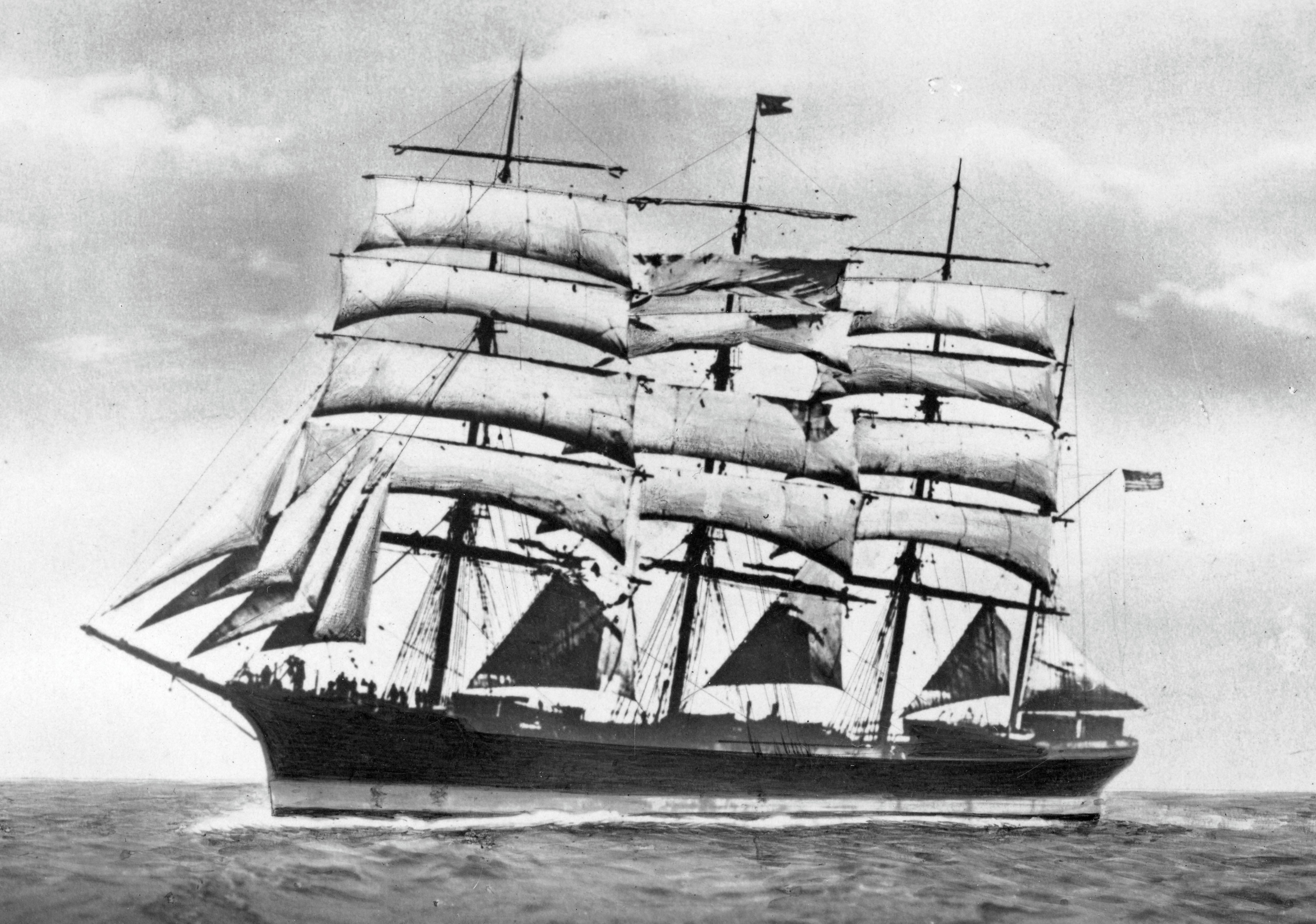
- Star of Lapland, one of Acme's sisterships, under sail

History

United States
- Name: Acme (1901-1913); Star of Poland (1913-1918)
- Owner: Standard Oil (1901-1912); Alaska Packers' Association (1912-1918)
- Builder: Arthur Sewall & Company, Bath, Maine
- Cost: US$190,000
- Launched: 21 May 1901
- Fate: Wrecked, 1918

General characteristics
- Tonnage: GRT: 3,288
- Length: 332.2 feet (101.3 m)
- Beam: 45.4 feet (13.8 m)
- Draft: 26.1 feet (8.0 m)
- Propulsion: 4 masts
- Sail plan: Shipentine

Acme was a steel-hulled shipentine launched for Standard Oil in 1901 to carry kerosene between the Eastern US Coast and East Asia. The ship performed several voyages to Asia between 1901 and 1905 for Standard Oil, and once for the US Navy, before being primarily used for domestic voyages between ports in the United States. In 1912, she was sold to the Alaska Packers' Association and used to supply a network of fish canneries in Alaska under the name Star of Poland. She operated in this role until 1916, before being chartered for several cargo voyages throughout the eastern Pacific. During one such voyage in 1918, she was wrecked on the Japanese coast by a typhoon and abandoned.

== Development and design ==
During the 19th and early 20th century, a common strategy for American shipyards to cheaply design vessels was to lengthen the hullform of a successful design. Often achieved by inserting a segment into the hull, the change increased the design's tonnage and carrying capacity at the cost of seakeeping ability. The steel-hulled shipentine Erskine M. Phelps was launched in 1898 by Arthur Sewall & Company, and received praised for her overall capability. The shipyard inserted a 20-foot (6.1 m) segment into the design of Erskine M. Phelps amidship, and built six ships of similar design. Three of the vessels were ordered by the Standard Oil Company and named Astral, Acme, and Atlas to carry canned kerosene (case oil) between the US East Coast and East Asia. The trio represented the only American-built "kerosene clippers", which were intended to meet massive demand for kerosene in East Asia following the introduction of Mei Foo lamps. While steamships had been widely adopted by the 20th century, a lack of coaling stations on the long routes to Asia made sailing vessels economical for bulk cargoes.

Atlas featured four masts, a steel hull, and was rigged as a barque. She was rated to have a gross tonnage of 3,288 tons, and a net tonnage of 2,987 tons for a capacity of 5,000 tons, which could include up to 135,000 cases of oil. The ship featured a length of 332.2 feet (101.3 m), beam of 45.4 feet (13.8 m), draft of 26.1 feet (8.0 m), two decks, and a total cost of US$190,000. She was the second of the three, built by Arthur Sewall & Company at Bath, Maine, and launched on 21 May 1901.

== Service history ==
=== Standard Oil ===
Acme first went out to sea on 1 July 1901, when she was towed from Bath to New York City. Her first voyage was between New York and Yokohama, Japan, which took 204 days as she went around Cape Horn and Australia. A race was held against Anglo-American Oil's Brilliant, another kerosene clipper also on her maiden voyage. Brilliant had a slow passage partially owing to a damaged steering gear, but still arrived in Yokohama after 177 days, beating Acme. Neither record was impressive, as the uninvolved Arthur Sewall performed the same voyage in only 130 days in the same year. A rematch was later held, which Brilliant won again.

Acme made two similar voyages to Yokohama over the next four years, with a return cargo of sugar from Honolulu. In 1905, she was chartered by the US Navy to carry coal to Manila. On 9 September, the ship was off Java and slowly drifted without wind. In the evening, she struck an uncharted reef and the crew prepared to abandon ship. As there was no clear danger, several sailors were sent ashore to contact the company. Standard Oil dispatched two steamships, and Acme was freed on 16 September. Instead of paying for expensive repairs in Tandjong Priok, she was towed to Manila and repaired for the next two months. On the return voyage the next year, she had to backtrack to avoid a large field of icebergs while off Cape Horn and later rescued the crew of schooner Gertrude A. Bartlett.

For the next several years, Acme performed shorter voyages between the east and west coasts of the United States, Honolulu and San Francisco carrying sugar and smaller domestic voyages on the west coast. The change occurred when the US government prioritized American ships for domestic trade and governmental cargo. By 1912, Improvements in steam oil tankers made Standard Oil's sailing ships redundant, and the trio was sold off to the Alaska Packers' Association.

=== Alaska Packers' Association ===
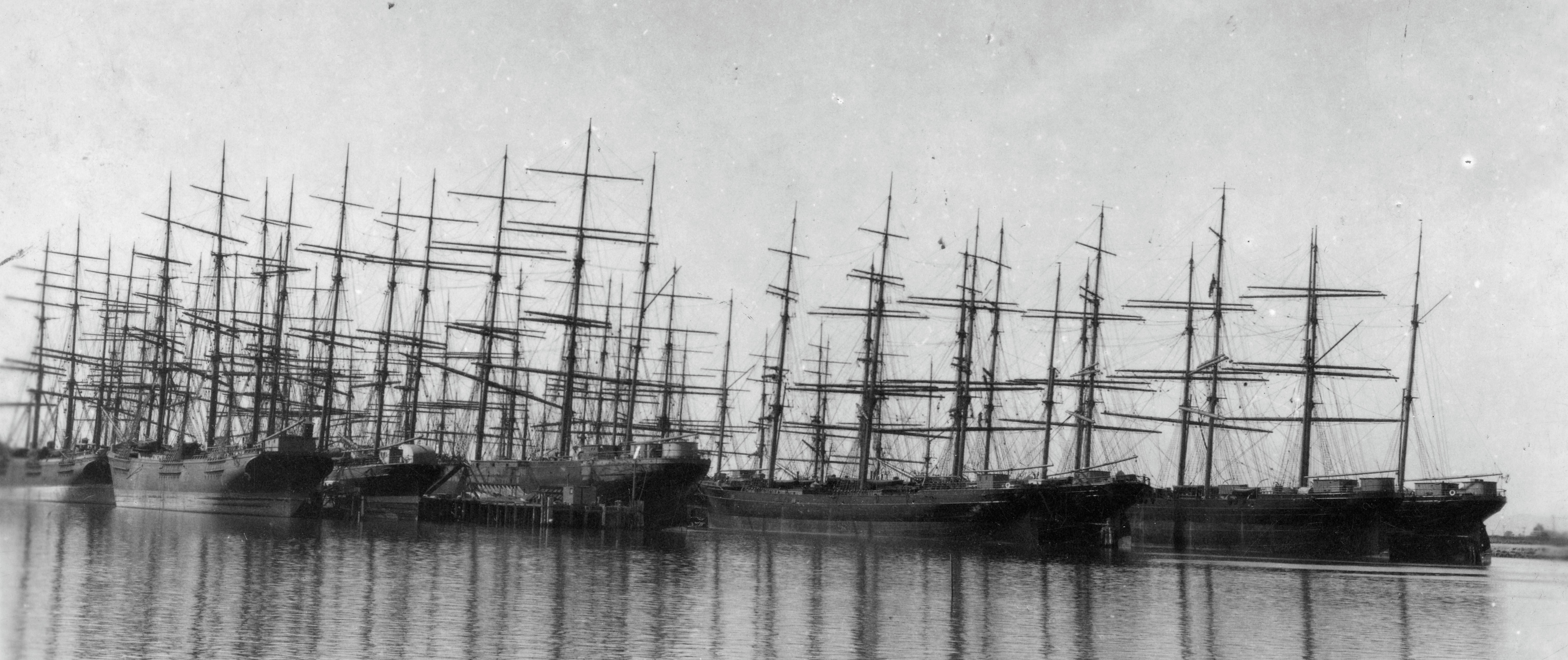
The Alaska Packers' Association fleet laid up in California several years after the destruction of Star of Poland

The Alaska Packers' Association (APA) operated a large fleet of tall ships which were used to cheaply supply a network of Alaskan fish canneries. Ships in the APA fleet operated during the spring and summer, and were laid up every year at Alameda, California, during the winter. Following the Association's practice of having each ship's name feature the prefix "Star of", Acme was renamed Star of Poland following the 1913 season. The shipentine was refitted, and spent part of February 1914 carrying a load of coal from British Columbia to the fleet in California before she spent the canning season supporting the cannery in Loring; the same pattern was repeated the next year. By 1916, World War I increased demand for neutral American merchant ships. Star of Poland was chartered and spent the next two years carrying cargo throughout the Eastern Pacific.

In 1918, she was chartered by the United States Shipping Board to supply Manila with general cargo. After a delay in finding an American crew, she arrived and set sail back to San Francisco in August. Star of Poland went North towards Japan when her captain decided there was not enough provisions onboard for the predicably slow voyage. The ship spent 42 days in bad weather attempting to reach Yokohama when a typhoon approached. On the morning of 15 September, she ran aground and heavy waves began to break the ship apart into pieces and destroy the masts. The ship was abandoned and all-but-one members of the crew reached shore and were rescued. The board compensated the Association for her cost, which was used to purchase Arapahoe and the barque Edward Sewall.
