= The Great Man (novel) =

2007 novel by Kate Christensen

- First edition
- Author: Kate Christensen
- Language: English
- Publisher: Doubleday (first edition)
- Publication date: 2007
- Publication place: United States
- Media type: Print (hardback)
- Pages: 320 pp
- ISBN: 0-385-51845-5
- OCLC: 84903243
- Dewey Decimal: 813/.54 22
- LC Class: PS3553.H716 G74 2007

The Great Man is a 2007 novel by American author Kate Christensen. It won the 2008 PEN/Faulkner Award for Fiction, beating nearly 350 other submissions and earning Christensen the $15,000 top prize.

== Plot ==
The story takes place five years after the death, at 78, of celebrated painter Oscar Feldman, the "great man" of the title. Two competing biographers, both working to document the life and times of a man who made his fortune painting nude women, turn for information to the women who had shared his life: his wife, his mistress, and his sister, who is also a painter.

Oscar Feldman was married to Abigail, the daughter of a rich Jewish family. They have a son who has autism.

For many years Oscar had an affair with Teddy. Together they have twin daughters, Ruby and Samantha. Ruby never married whereas Samantha is married and has children.

Oscar's sister Maxine was quite successful as a painter earlier, but later was almost forgotten by the art community. Her brother had always been more famous than Maxine, which was quite ironic: Oscar became well known in the art world for a diptych of two female nudes, Helena and Mercy. Helena was actually painted by Maxine. It was a picture of then lesbian lover.

== Reception ==
Janet Maslin, writing in The New York Times, calls The Great Man "mischievous" and found it "a gentler book than The Epicure’s Lament. .. It’s also a wise and expansive one, and it allows its characters to flourish in unexpectedly rewarding ways." The San Francisco Chronicle, on the other hand, found it "a regular catfight of unlikable characters." and concluded "Without a doubt, Christensen has a knack for the piquant turn of phrase. Unfortunately, she wields her wands far too frequently and suffocates her characters before they've had a chance to earn our sympathies. In the end, the verbal burlesque is simply too much."

The Great Man has also been reviewed by Library Journal, Booklist, The Austin Chronicle, Kirkus Reviews, and Publishers Weekly,

== See also ==
- Trouble (novel)
