= Blue Plate Special =

Blue Plate Special may refer to:

- Blue-plate special, a low-priced restaurant meal
- Damon Runyon's Blue Plate Special, 1934 short story collection by Damon Runyon
- Blue Plate Special: An Autobiography of My Appetites, a 2013 memoir by Kate Christensen
- Blue Plate Special, an EP by the Dance Hall Crashers, 1998
- Blue Plate Specials Live, a 1999 ska album by the Specials
- Blue Plate Special (Prairie Oyster album), 1996
- Blue Plate Special (Will Bernard album), 2008
