= Pacific Packing and Navigation Company =

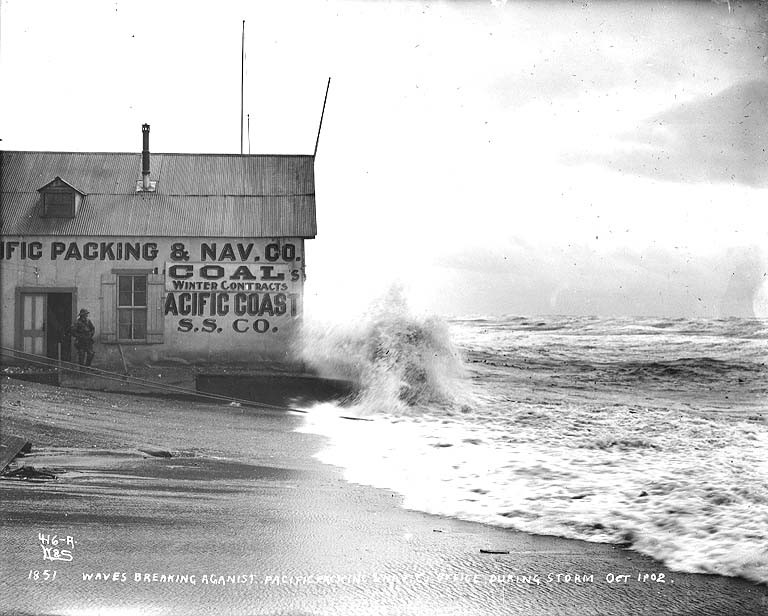
Waves breaking against Pacific Packing & Navigation Co office on the beach during a storm of 1902, Nome, Alaska

Pacific Packing and Navigation Company is a defunct salmon-canning company which operated in the U.S. state of Alaska. Incorporated under the laws of New Jersey and backed by eastern capitalists, it was formed during the spring of 1901, the idea of Roland B. Onnfroy. It aimed to consolidate the properties and privileges of Alaska companies and firms. The company proposed to capitalize the new corporation with 6 percent debentures, $7,000,000; 7 percent cumulative preferred stock, $12,500,000; common stock, $12,500,000.

The Pacific Packing and Navigation Company acquired the following properties in Alaska:

- Canneries of Pacific Steam Whaling Company at Nushagak, Bristol Bay; Chignik, Alaska Peninsula; Uyak, Kadiak Island; Kenai, Cook Inlet; Orca, Prince William Sound; Hunter Bay, Southeast Alaska.
- Hume Bros. and Hume, with canneries at Chignik, Alaska Peninsula, and Ifyak, Kadiak Island.
- Thlinket Packing Company, canneries at Gerard Point and Santa Anna Bay, Southeast Alaska.
- Western Fisheries Company, with a cannery at Dundas Bay, Icy Strait.
- Chilkoot Packing Company, with a cannery at Chilkoot Inlet.
- Taku Packing Company, with a cannery at Taku Inlet.
- Taku Fishing Company, with a cannery at the entrance to Port Snettisham.
- Boston Fishing à Trading Company, with a cannery at Yee Bay.
- Chatham Straits Packing Company, with a cannery at Sitkoh Bay.
- Icy Strait Packing Company, with a cannery at Petersburg, Wrangell Narrows.
- Quadra Packing Company, with a cannery at Mink Bay, Boca de Quadra

It further acquired companies in the Puget Sound region of Washington state:

- Pacific-American Fisheries Company, with canneries at Fairhaven and one at Friday Harbor.
- Ainsworth and Dunn, with canneries at Seattle and Friday Harbor.
- Fairhaven Canning Company, with a cannery at Fairhaven.

The Pacific Packing and Navigation Company represented 23 canneries with their equipage. The company claimed an Alaska pack for 1901 of about 700,000 cases, and expected to increase its output to have a total capacity of 1,000,000 per season. The Alaska Packers' Association was its major rival, with approximately 50 percent of the total production. The Pacific Packing and Navigation Company followed with about 30 per cent. The remaining 20 per cent were distributed among independent concerns.

In 1903, the reported capital stock was cut down from $12,500,000 to $1,000,000 as the corporation was insolvent and in process of liquidation with much of the property having been sold off.

By 1904, the Pacific Packing and Navigation Company was in the hands of a receiver, J. B. McGovern. In the report of the committee, it is said that a plan was advanced for forming the new corporation with capital, of which $1,500,000 was to be preferred stock, and $1,500.000, common. Of the latter amount 11,400 was to be accepted by the holders of the company's notes and debentures in full settlement of their claims on a 40 per cent, basis. The preferred stock was to be an eight per cent, accumulative issue, maturing at the end of five years, and redeemable pro rata at any time during that period at the discretion of the directors, by the payment of ten per cent, per annum, the holders to receive the benefit of the premium, whether the stock ran to maturity or not. In addition, the new company was to acquire all the assets of the Pacific Packing and Navigation Company, and the Pacific American Fisheries Company at receiver's sale. The directors of the company were to consist of five residents of San Francisco, two of Seattle, and two of New York, all of whom were to represent the Preferred Stockholders. Common stockholders had no vote until all the preferred stock has been redeemed. The main offices of the company were to be located in Seattle or San Francisco.

== Bibliography ==
- Newell, Diane (1 December 1989). Development of the Pacific Salmon-Canning Industry: A Grown Man's Game. McGill-Queen's Press. ISBN 978-0-7735-0717-3.
- United States Fish Commission (1902). Bulletin of the United States Fish Commission (Public domain ed.). U.S. Government Printing Office.
- United States Fish and Wildlife Service (1905). Alaska Fishery and Fur-seal Industries (Public domain ed.). U.S. Government Printing Office.
- Western Field (1904). Western Field: The Sportsman's Magazine of the West (Public domain ed.). Western Field.
