= Astral (shipentine) =

American tall ship

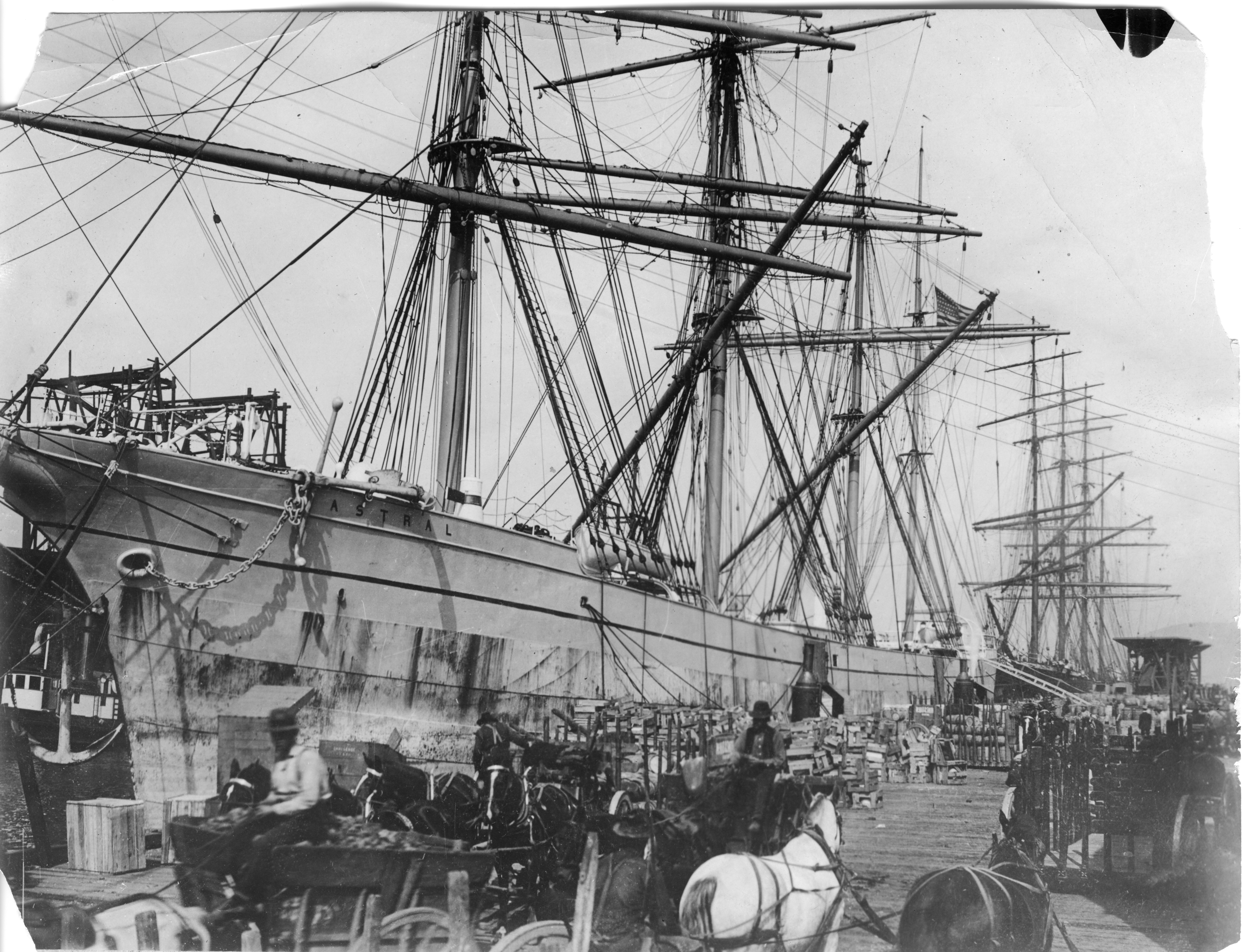
- Astral being repainted in San Francisco

History

United States
- Name: Astral (1900-1910); Star of Zealand (1910-1934); Star of Zealand Maru (1934-1935)
- Owner: Standard Oil (1900-1910); Alaska Packers' Association (1910-1934); Transpacific Commercial Company (1934-1935)
- Builder: Arthur Sewall & Company, Bath, Maine
- Cost: US$190,000
- Laid down: May 1900
- Launched: 8 December 1900
- Fate: Scrapped, 1935

General characteristics
- Tonnage: GRT: 3,292
- Length: 332.3 feet (101.3 m)
- Beam: 45.4 feet (13.8 m)
- Draft: 26.0 feet (7.9 m)
- Propulsion: 4 masts
- Sail plan: Shipentine

Astral was a steel-hulled shipentine built for Standard Oil in 1900 to carry kerosene between the Eastern US Coast and East Asia. The ship performed eight uneventful voyages for Standard Oil between 1902 and 1910. That year, she was sold to Alaska Packers' Association and renamed Star of Zealand and used to supply a network of fish canneries in Alaska before she was laid up in 1929 along with most of the fleet. Following the Great Depression, the ship was sold off to a Japanese company in 1934 and renamed Star of Zealand Maru. The next year, she was broken up for her steel hull in Japan.

== Development and design ==
During the 19th and early 20th century, a common strategy for American shipyards to cheaply design vessels was to lengthen the hullform of a successful design. Often achieved by inserting a segment into the hull, the change increased the design's tonnage and carrying capacity at the cost of seakeeping ability. Launched in 1898 by Arthur Sewall & Company, the steel-hulled shipentine Erskine M. Phelps was praised for her overall capability. The shipyard inserted a 20-foot (6.1 m) segment into the design of Erskine M. Phelps amidship, and built six ships with longer design. Three of the vessels were ordered by the Standard Oil Company and named Astral, Acme, and Atlas to carry canned kerosene (case oil) between the US East Coast and East Asia. The trio represented the only American-built "kerosene clippers", which were intended to supply massive demand for kerosene in East Asia following the introduction of Mei Foo lamps. While steamships had been widely adopted by the 20th century, a lack of coaling stations on the long routes to Asia made sailing vessels economical.

Atlas featured four masts, a steel hull, and was rigged as a barque. She was rated to have a gross tonnage of 3,292 tons, and a net tonnage of 2,987 tons for a capacity of 5,000 tons, which could include up to 135,000 cases of oil. The ship featured a length of 332.3 feet (101.3 m), beam of 45.4 feet (13.8 m), draft of 26.0 feet (7.9 m), two decks, and a total cost of US$190,000. She was the first of the three to be built by Arthur Sewall & Company, and was laid down in May 1900 and launched on 8 December.

== Service history ==
=== Standard Oil ===
On 6 January 1901, Astral was towed from the shipyard in Bath, Maine, to New York City. For the next 10 years, she performed 8 uneventful voyages for Standard Oil, primarily carrying oil from New York City to ports in China or Japan by sailing around Cape Horn. Other ports visited included Honolulu, Baltimore, and Oakland, although by 1907 she regularly visited San Francisco to carry oil to the Pacific and miscellaneous goods to the American East Coast. On 18 April 1910, three days into her eighth voyage, the ship was sold to the Alaska Packers' Association. Improvements in steam oil tankers made Standard Oil's sailing ships redundant, and the trio was sold off to the Alaska Packers' Association that year.

=== Alaska Packers' Association ===
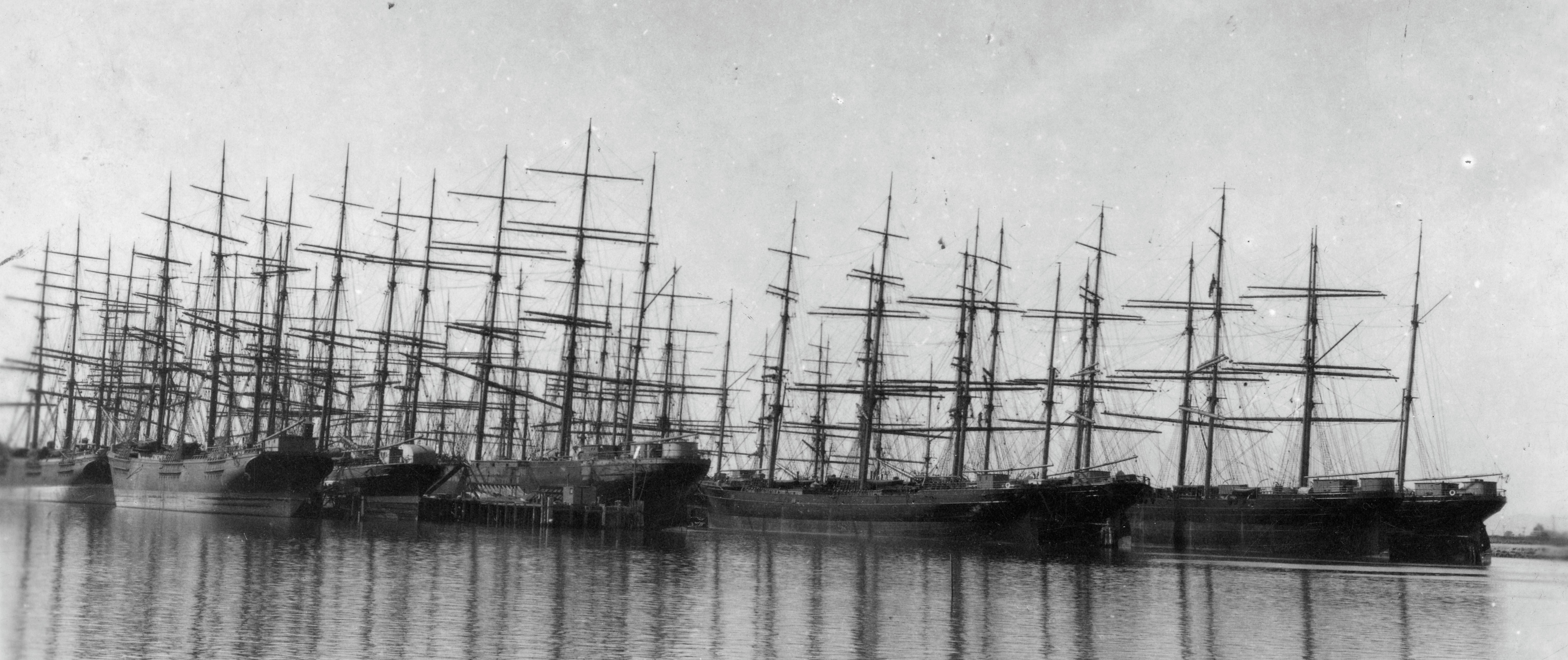
The Alaska Packers' Association fleet of tall ships laid up c. 1920, which included Star of Zealand

The Alaska Packers' Association (APA) operated a large fleet of tall ships which were used to cheaply supply a network of Alaskan fish canneries. Following the Association's practice of having each ship's name feature the prefix "Star of", Atlas was renamed Star of Zealand when she reached San Francisco in November 1910. Ships in the APA fleet operated during the spring and summer, and were laid up every year at Alameda, California, during the winter. The ship was laid up for the last time following her 1929 cruise when the Association began to adopt steamships and the Great Depression impacted business.

For the next several years, the fleet idled as low demand made it unprofitable for her to be sold off. By 1934, a plan to convert the ships to operate in the Australian grain trade was abandoned due to high cost of retrofitting the ships. That November, the Transpacific Commercial Company bought Star of Zealand, Star of Shetland, Star of Lapland, and Star of Holland to dismantle the ships in Japan and recover steel from the hulls. Star of Zealand was the first to leave California, and departed on 30 August 1935 under the name Star of Lapland Maru. Eighty-two days later, she arrived at Yawata, Japan, to be scrapped.
