= Astral Apartments =

Apartment building in New York City

- The Astral Apartments
- U.S. National Register of Historic Places
- New York City Landmark
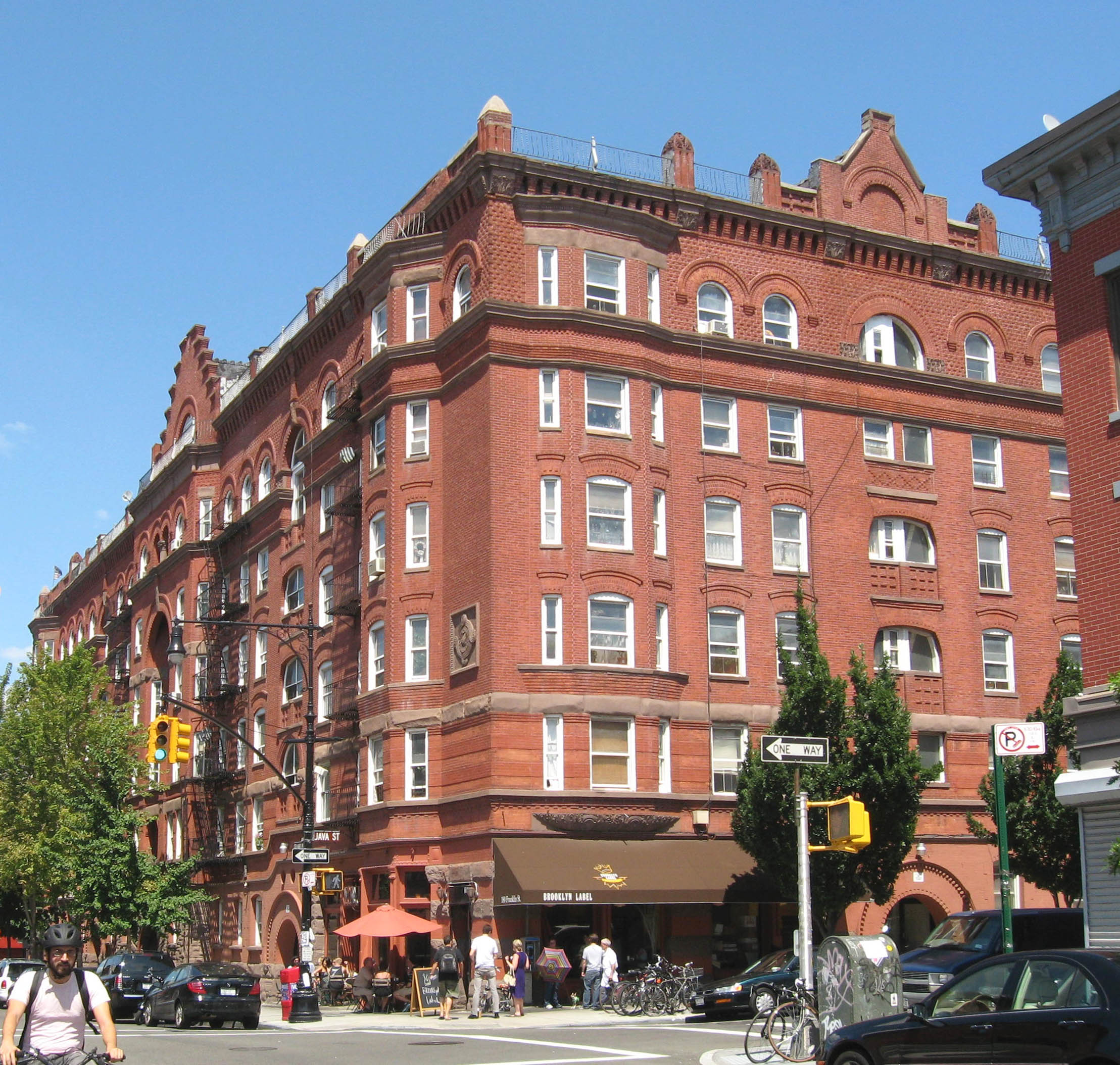
- Astral Apartments, August 2008

- Location within New York City Location within New York Location within the United States
- Location: 184 Franklin St., Brooklyn, New York
- Coordinates: 40°43′54″N 73°57′28″W
- Area: less than one acre
- Built: 1885
- Architect: Lamb & Rich
- NRHP reference No.: 82001178
- NYCL No.: 1194

Significant dates
- Added to NRHP: October 29, 1982
- Designated NYCL: June 28, 1983

The Astral Apartments is an apartment building located at 184 Franklin Street in Greenpoint, Brooklyn, New York City. The Astral was built in 1885–1886 as affordable housing for employees of Charles Pratt's Astral Oil Works. It is a block-long brick and terra cotta building in the Queen Anne style. It features a central projecting section with a deep, three-story-high round arch recess. The roof features inward-looking decorative grotesques. Original amenities of the building included a settlement house, library, and kindergarten.

Originally, a branch of the Pratt Institute Free Library operated from the ground floor of the Astral.

The building was designed to echo red-brick apartments built for workers by George Peabody in London. It was listed on the National Register of Historic Places in 1982 and designated a New York City landmark in 1983.

== In popular culture ==
The building is the fictional setting for Kate Christensen's 2011 novel The Astral: A Novel.
