= The Epicure's Lament =

2004 novel by Kate Christensen

- First edition
- Author: Kate Christensen
- Language: English
- Genre: Fiction
- Published: 2004 (Doubleday)
- Publication place: USA
- Media type: Print (Hardback)
- Pages: 351
- ISBN: 9780767910309
- OCLC: 52134834

The Epicure's Lament is a 2004 novel by Kate Christensen. The novel is the journal of Hugo Whittier, a forty-year-old would-be hermit living by himself in the family mansion on the Hudson River, cooking elaborate meals for himself, reading Montaigne, and reckoning with the ghosts of the past as well as a series of "tedious interlopers," his older brother, estranged ex-wife, and purported daughter foremost among them.

== Reception ==
In a review of The Epicure's Lament, Salon wrote "The Epicure’s Lament is the result of an ambition so quixotic that you may get quite a few pages into Kate Christensen’s new novel before you decide to sign on for the duration. .. characters with voices so strong and attitudes so egregious that reading about them becomes a long, tricky balancing act between the reflexive sympathy we feel for whoever tells us a story and our suspicion that we’re dealing with a rather bad man." and concluded "The Epicure’s Lament becomes funnier the more Hugo begins to engage with the people he purports to loathe, and the more it becomes clear he’s not quite ready to leave yet. Why an author would set herself the formidable task of creating such a creature — and then convincing us to like him — is a bit puzzling, but why look a gift horse in the mouth?" and The New York Times called it "readable, but it's also clever to a fault and often static."

The Epicure's Lament has also been reviewed by Library Journal, Booklist, January Magazine, Kirkus Reviews, and Publishers Weekly.
