= Atlas (shipentine) =

American tall ship

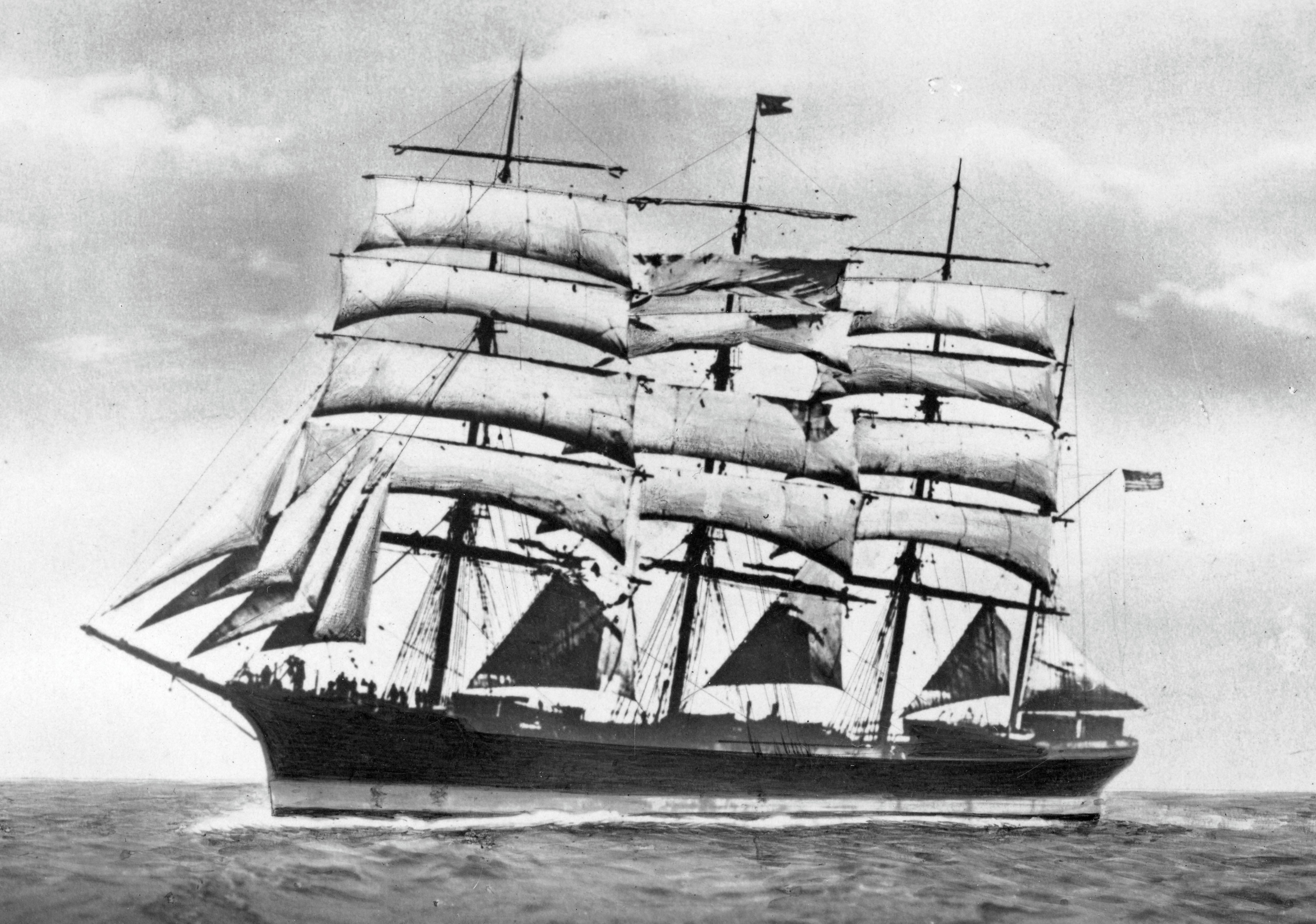
- Star of Lapland, formerly Atlas, under sail

History

United States
- Name: Atlas (1902–1910); Star of Lapland (1910–1934); Star of Lapland Maru (1934–1936)
- Owner: Standard Oil (1902–1910); Alaska Packers' Association (1910–1934); Transpacific Commercial Company (1934–1936)
- Ordered: May 1901
- Builder: Arthur Sewall & Company, Bath, Maine
- Laid down: May 1901
- Launched: 11 January 1902
- Fate: Scrapped, 1936

General characteristics
- Tonnage: GRT: 3,381
- Length: 332.4 feet (101.3 m)
- Beam: 45.4 feet (13.8 m)
- Draft: 26.1 feet (8.0 m)
- Propulsion: 4 masts
- Sail plan: Shipentine

Atlas was a steel-hulled shipentine built for Standard Oil in 1901 to carry kerosene between the East Coast of the United States and East Asia. Launched in 1902, she was the last square-rigged sailing ship built in the United States. The ship performed seven voyages for Standard Oil between 1902 and 1910; in 1907, Atlas collided with the barque Viking off Cape Horn, sinking the latter ship. In 1910, the ship was sold to the Alaska Packers' Association and renamed the Star of Lapland and was used to supply a network of fish canneries in Alaska. She operated as the flagship of the company's fleet until she was laid up in 1927. Following the Great Depression, the ship was sold off to a Japanese company in 1934 and renamed the Star of Lapland Maru. Two years later, she was broken up for her steel hull.

== Development and design ==
During the 19th and early 20th century, a common strategy for American shipyards to cheaply design vessels was to lengthen the hullform of a successful design. Often achieved by inserting a segment into the hull, the change increased the design's tonnage and carrying capacity at the cost of seakeeping ability. Launched in 1898 by Arthur Sewall & Company, the steel-hulled shipentine Erskine M. Phelps was praised for her overall capability. The shipyard inserted a 20-foot (6.1 m) segment into the design of Erskine M. Phelps amidship, and built six ships with longer design. Three of the vessels were ordered by the Standard Oil Company and named Astral, Acme, and Atlas to carry canned kerosene (case oil) between the US East Coast and East Asia. The trio represented the only American-built "kerosene clippers", which were intended to meet massive demand for kerosene in East Asia following the introduction of Mei Foo lamps. While steamships had been widely adopted by the 20th century, a lack of coaling stations on the long routes to Asia made sailing vessels economical for non-perishable bulk cargoes.

Atlas featured four masts, a steel hull, and was rigged as a barque. She was rated to have a gross tonnage of 3,381 tons, and a net tonnage of 3,006 tons for a capacity of 5,000 tons, which could include up to 133,000 cases of oil. She featured a length of 332.4 feet (101.3 m), beam of 45.4 feet (13.8 m), draft of 26.1 feet (8.0 m), and two decks. The ship was ordered from Arthur Sewall & Company in May 1901 and laid down later that month. By November, Standard Oil considered converting the uncompleted ship into a barge, although the shipyard was opposed to the expensive idea as it could damage their reputation for fair prices. The idea was later dropped, and she was launched on 11 January 1902, ultimately becoming the last square-rigged sailing ship built in the United States.

== Service history ==
=== Standard Oil ===
The first voyage of Atlas began on 16 February 1902, when she was guided by two tugboats from Bath, Maine to New York City. Due to poor weather, the trip took eight days and ended on 24 February. Her maiden voyage for Standard Oil began on 23 March, and took a relatively slow 133 days to reach Hong Kong. After offloading the oil and taking on a mixed cargo of matting, fans, firecrackers, and straw cuffs, she sailed for Baltimore on 2 November. Over the next seven years, the ship would perform an additional six similar voyages for Standard Oil, all of which began and terminated in New York City. The ship delivered cargo to cities such as Yokohama, Manila, and Shanghai while also visiting Pacific ports such as Honolulu or San Francisco on the return trip.

Star of Lapland (sailing ship)

An exception occurred during the fifth voyage, which lasted between 1907 and 1908. In the evening of 5 June 1907, Atlas collided with the Norwegian barque Viking while off the Diego Ramírez Islands near Cape Horn. The Norwegian crew climbed aboard the American vessel, concerned that their ship would sink. The only fatalities were the captain of Viking and his wife, who fell between the two ships during the evacuation and were never recovered. The abandoned Viking continued to drift, and her wreck was later located about 100 miles (160 km) away. The bow of Atlas was heavily damaged during the accident with the forepeak slowly flooding and rigging ripped off. Unable to proceed further, the shipentine turned around as survivors from Viking were hired to help bail out the forepeak. Storms prevented the ship from reaching nearby ports, and she limped to Rio de Janeiro and was repaired for six weeks before continuing.

=== Alaska Packers' Association ===
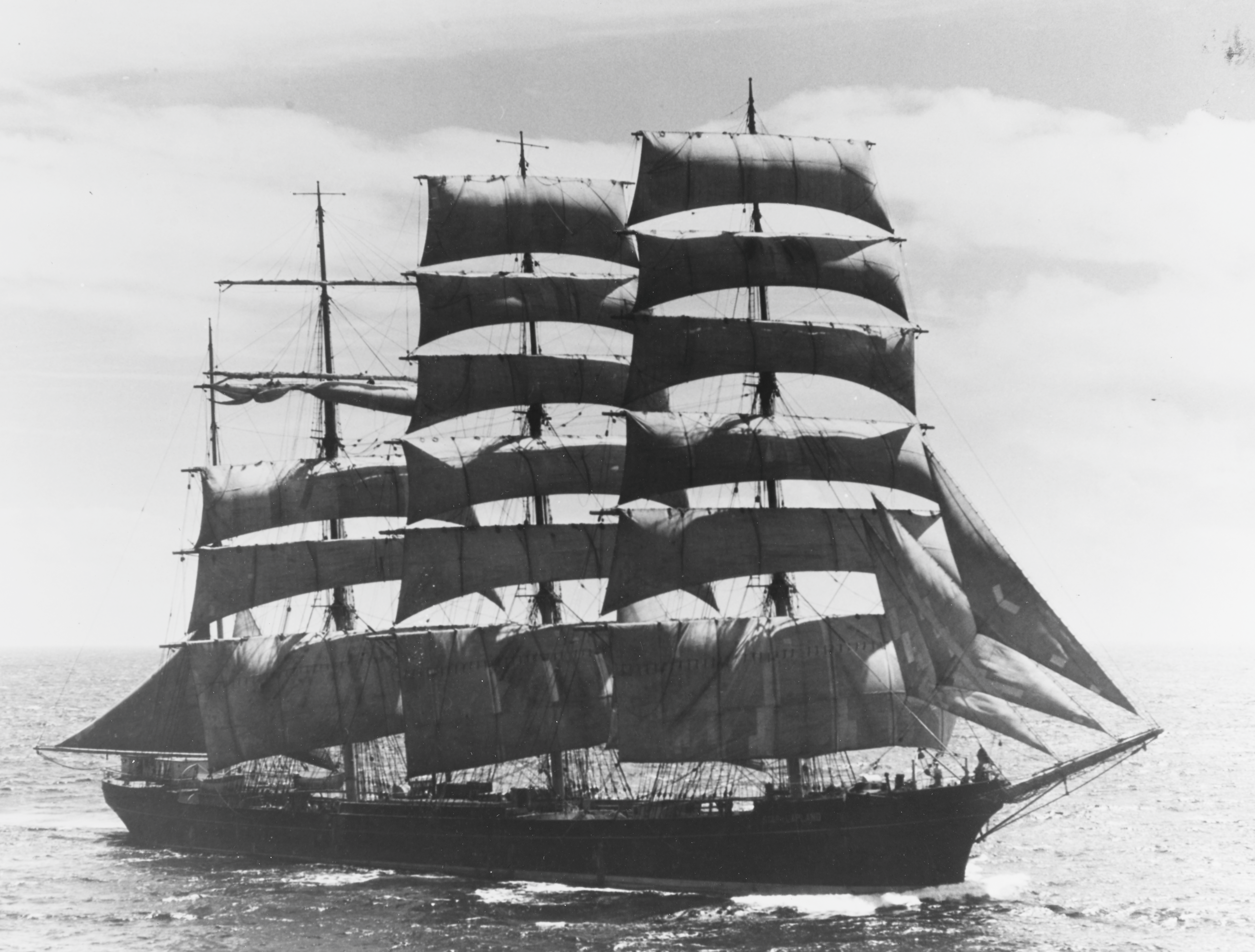
Star of Lapland Maru on her last voyage in September 1936 off Hawaii.

By 1910, improvements in steam oil tankers made Standard Oil's sailing ships redundant, and the trio was sold off to the Alaska Packers' Association that year. The Association owned a large fleet of tall ships which were used supply a network of Alaskan fish canneries. As the largest ship in the fleet, Atlas was made flagship and renamed Star of Lapland, adopting the prefix "Star of" used by the company. She was primarily used to supply the cannery in Naknek and transport coal from British Columbia to other company locations. These voyages occurred during the spring and summer months during the canning season, with the ship laid up in California during the winters.

The ship was laid up for the last time in 1927 at Alameda, California, as the Association began to adopt steamships and retire the fleet of sailing vessels. The company retained, and continued to maintain, the ships as it was unsure if they would later become economically viable. However, the Great Depression reinforced the need for steam ships. Star of Lapland idled for the next seven years as low demand made it unprofitable for her to be sold off. By 1934, a plan to convert the ships to operate in the Australian grain trade was abandoned due to high cost of retrofitting the ships. That November, the Transpacific Commercial Company bought Star of Lapland, Star of Shetland, Star of Zealand, and Star of Holland to dismantle the ships in Japan and recover steel from the hulls. After being fitted for a trans-Pacific voyage, Star of Lapland left California on 4 August 1936. The ship then visited Honolulu to replace the chronometer and fix the old steering gear before continuing, and reached Osaka on 5 October where she was scrapped.

== See also ==
- Video of Star of Lapland unloading cargo, starting at 7:28

== Sources ==
- Thober, Frank W. (1957). "American Oil Ships Part 4 - Atlas". Nautical Research Journal. 9 (5 & 6).
