= How to Cook a Moose =

2015 cookbook by Kate Christensen

How to Cook a Moose: A Culinary Memoir
- Author: Kate Christensen
- Language: English
- Genre: Memoir, Cookbook
- Published: 2015 (Islandport Press)
- Publication place: USA
- Media type: Print (Hardback)
- Pages: 292
- ISBN: 9781939017734
- OCLC: 902660077

How to Cook a Moose: A Culinary Memoir is a 2015 autobiographical cookbook by Kate Christensen. It is about Christensen leaving New York and settling in New England.

== Reception ==
The Los Angeles Review of Books, in a review of How to Cook a Moose, compared it to M. F. K. Fisher's book How to Cook a Wolf writing "The shoes Christensen was tasked to fill .. were cavernous. The challenge to carry on Fisher’s legacy, formidable. From the onset, Christensen seemed up to the challenge" and concluded "As a stand-alone, the book serves up heartfelt reflections on the food history of Maine and insights into the ways we build community, meal by meal. .. As a continuation of the social and culinary classic How to Cook a Wolf, it leaves the reader hungry for more." The Chicago Tribune wrote "Fans of Christensen's novels and of her cooking-and-living blog, who have drooled for years over her fairy-tale travel, culinary, and romantic adventures with Brendan, will delight in this raucously, unabashedly ecstatic paean to her adopted home in "the northern corner" of New England, and to her delicious, contented life."

How to Cook a Moose has also been reviewed by the Star Tribune, Kirkus Reviews, Library Journal, and Booklist

It won the 2016 Maine Literary Award for Memoir.
