= Balclutha (1886) =

Steel-hulled full rigged ship that was built in 1886

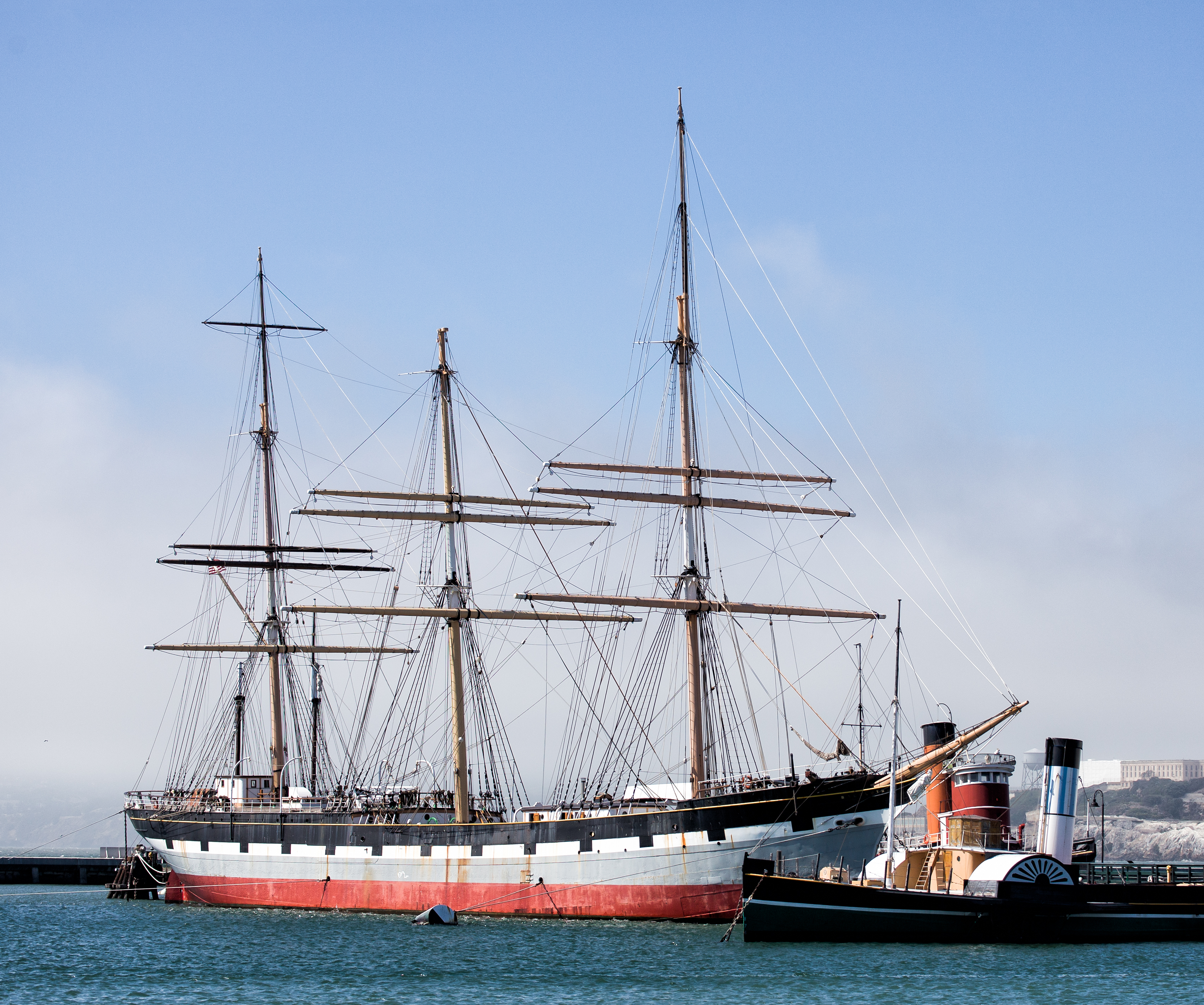
- Balclutha (back) at her mooring next to Eppleton Hall (front) in San Francisco

History

United Kingdom
- Namesake: Balclutha, New Zealand or Baile Chluaidh (Gaelic)
- Builder: Charles Connell & Co. Ltd.
- Launched: 6 December 1886
- In service: 15 January 1887
- Status: Museum ship since 1954

General characteristics
- Type: Three-masted full-rigged ship
- Tonnage: 1,689 GT; 1,614 NT
- Displacement: c. 4,100 tons
- Tons burthen: 2,650 tons
- Length: 301 ft (92 m)
- Beam: 38.6 ft (11.8 m)
- Height: 145 ft (44 m)
- Draught: 20.3 ft (6.2 m)
- Depth of hold: 22.7 ft (6.9 m)
- Propulsion: sail
- Sail plan: rigged with royal sails over double top & single topgallant sails; 25 sails in all
- Complement: 26; under the APA flag ~ 210
- Balclutha (square-rigger)
- U.S. National Register of Historic Places
- U.S. National Historic Landmark
- Location within San Francisco Bay Area Location within California Location within the United States
- Location: Mare Island, Vallejo, California
- Coordinates: 38.104°N 122.2715°W
- Built: 1886
- Architect: Charles Connell
- NRHP reference No.: 76000178

Significant dates
- Added to NRHP: 7 November 1976
- Designated NHL: 4 February 1985

Balclutha, also known as Star of Alaska, Pacific Queen, or Sailing Ship Balclutha, is a steel-hulled full-rigged ship that was built in 1886. She is representative of several different commercial ventures, including lumber, salmon, and grain. She is a U.S. National Historic Landmark and is currently preserved as part of San Francisco Maritime National Historical Park in San Francisco, California, although temporarily on display in Vallejo. She was added to the National Register of Historic Places on 7 November 1976.

== History ==
Balclutha was built in 1886 by Charles Connell and Company of Scotstoun in Glasgow, Scotland, for Robert McMillan, of Dumbarton, Scotland. Her name derives from the Gaelic Baile Chluaidh ("City on the Clyde", a poetic name for Dumbarton). Designed as a general trader, Balclutha rounded Cape Horn 17 times in thirteen years.

During this period she carried cargoes such as wine, case oil, and coal from Europe and the East Coast of the United States to various ports in the Pacific. These included Chile for nitrate, Australia and New Zealand for wool, Burma for rice, San Francisco for grain, and the Pacific Northwest for timber.

In 1899 Balclutha transferred to the registry of Hawaii, and traded timber from the Pacific Northwest to Australia, returning to San Francisco with Australian coal.

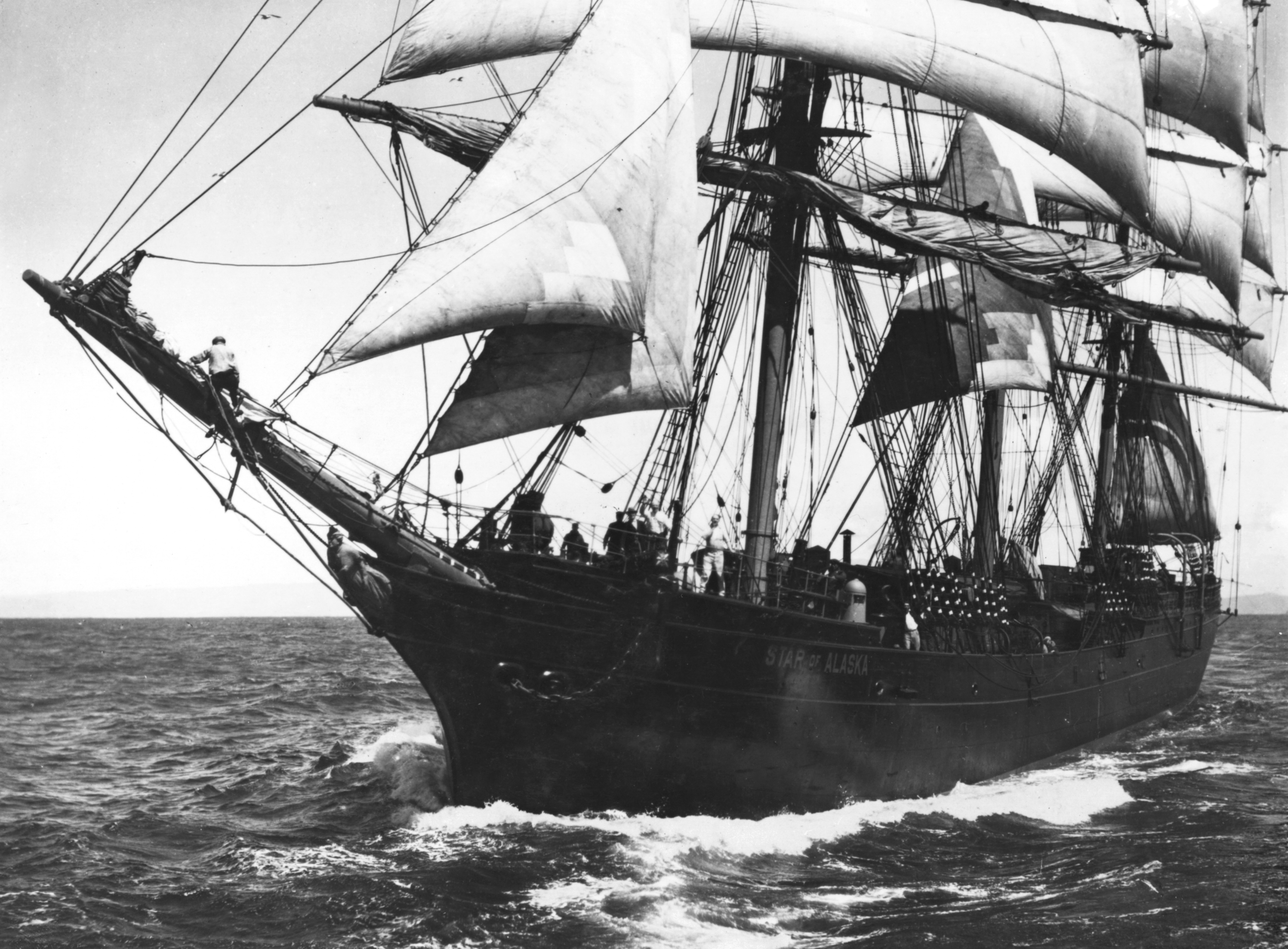
The ship sailed as the Star of Alaska between 1904 and 1930.

In 1902 Balclutha was chartered to the Alaska Packers' Association (APA). After having struck a reef off of Sitkinak Island near Kodiak Island on 16 May 1904, she was renamed the Star of Alaska when bought by APA for merely $500. After extended repairs she joined the salmon fishing trade, sailing north from the San Francisco area to the Chignik Bay, Alaska, in April with supplies, fishermen, and cannery workers, and returned in September with a cargo of canned salmon.

For this trade she carried over 200 crew and passengers, as compared to the 26-man crew she carried as the Balclutha. In 1911 the poop deck was extended to the main mast to accommodate Italian and Scandinavian workers. This expansion is called the shelter deck. In the 'tween deck, bunks for Chinese workers were built. Her last voyage in this trade was in 1930, when she then was laid up after her return home.

In 1933, Star of Alaska was renamed Pacific Queen by her new owner Frank Kissinger. In this guise she appeared in the film Mutiny on the Bounty starring Clark Gable and Charles Laughton. She then eked out an existence as an exhibition ship, gradually deteriorating, and was for a while exhibited as a "pirate ship".

In 1954, Pacific Queen was acquired by the San Francisco Maritime Museum, which restored her and renamed her Balclutha and moored her at Pier 41 East. In 1985 she was designated a National Historic Landmark.

In 1988, she was moved to a mooring at Hyde Street Pier of the San Francisco Maritime National Historical Park. She previously hosted a monthly Chantey Sing in the shelter deck, which has moved to the adjacent Eureka. In 2025, she was moved to Mare Island while the Hyde Street Pier is being replaced.

== Image gallery ==
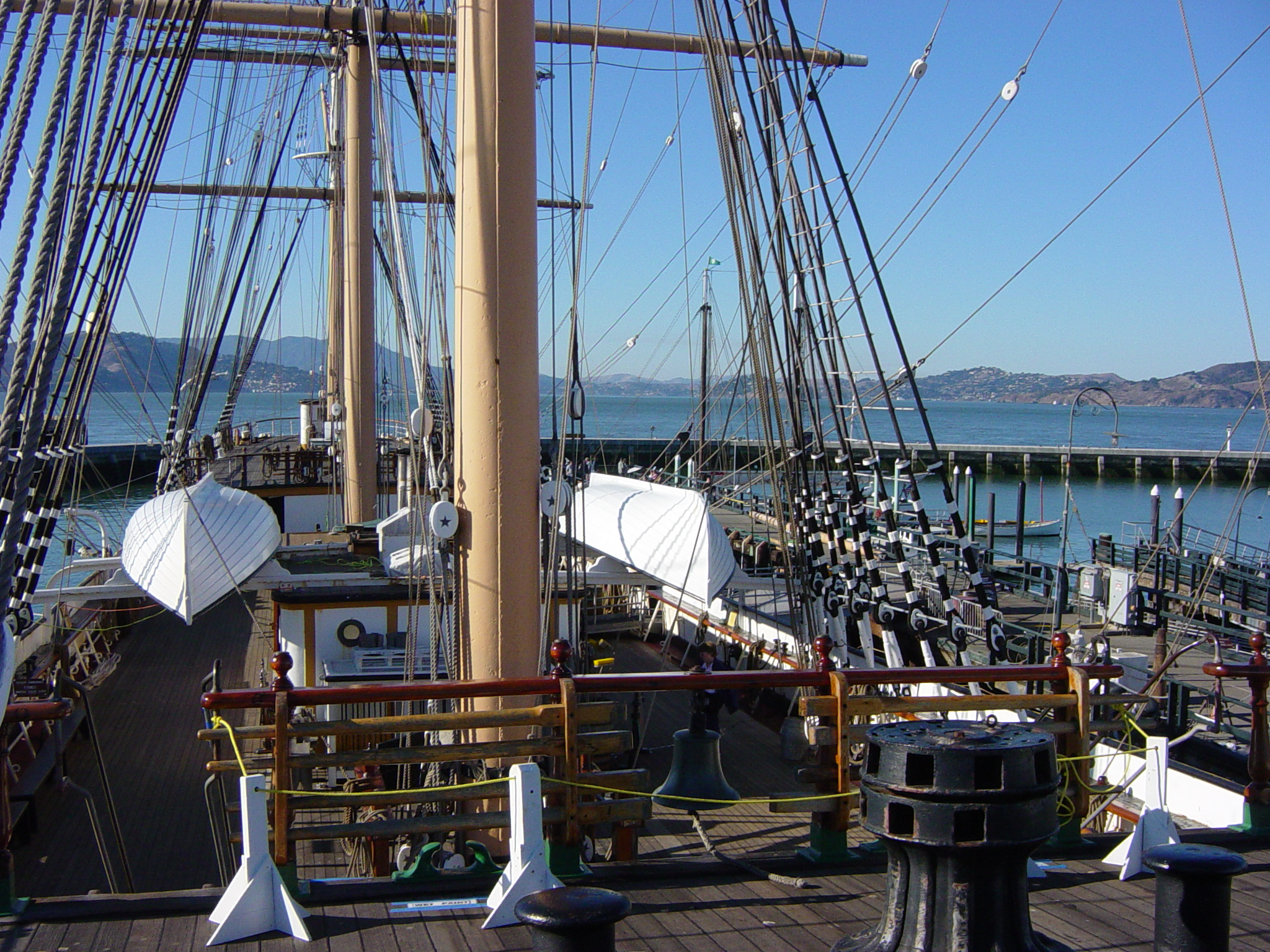
View aft from foredeck

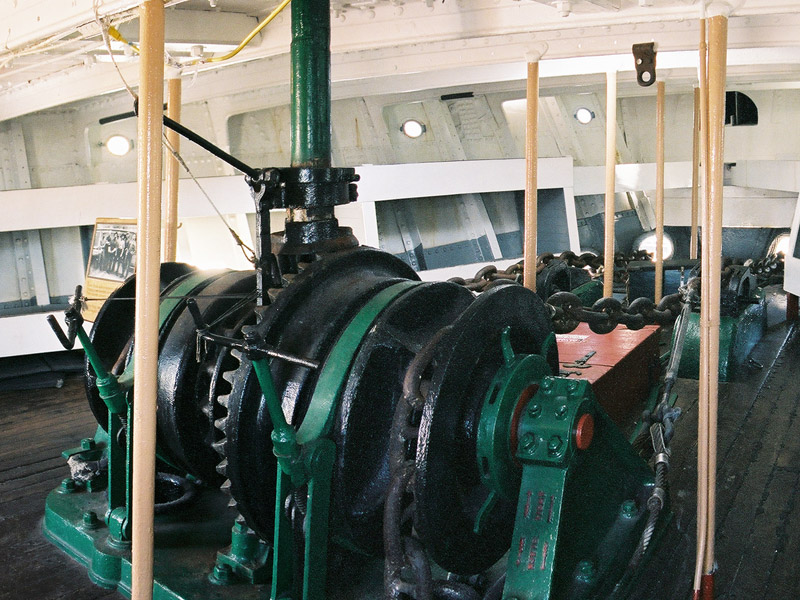
Anchor windlass in forecastle

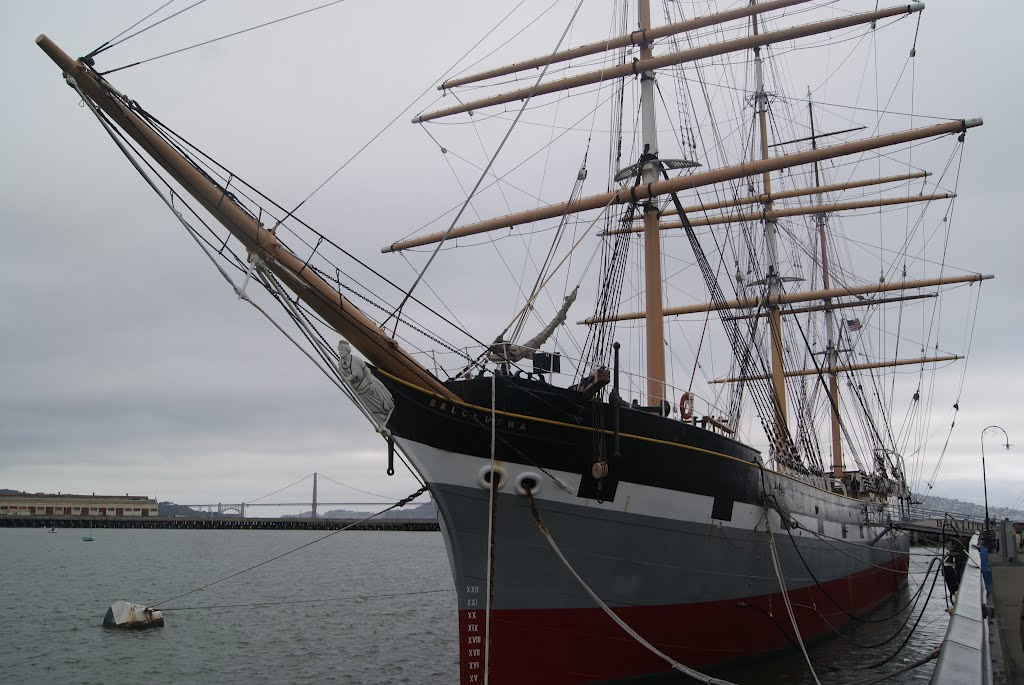
Bow and foremast, January 15, 2012

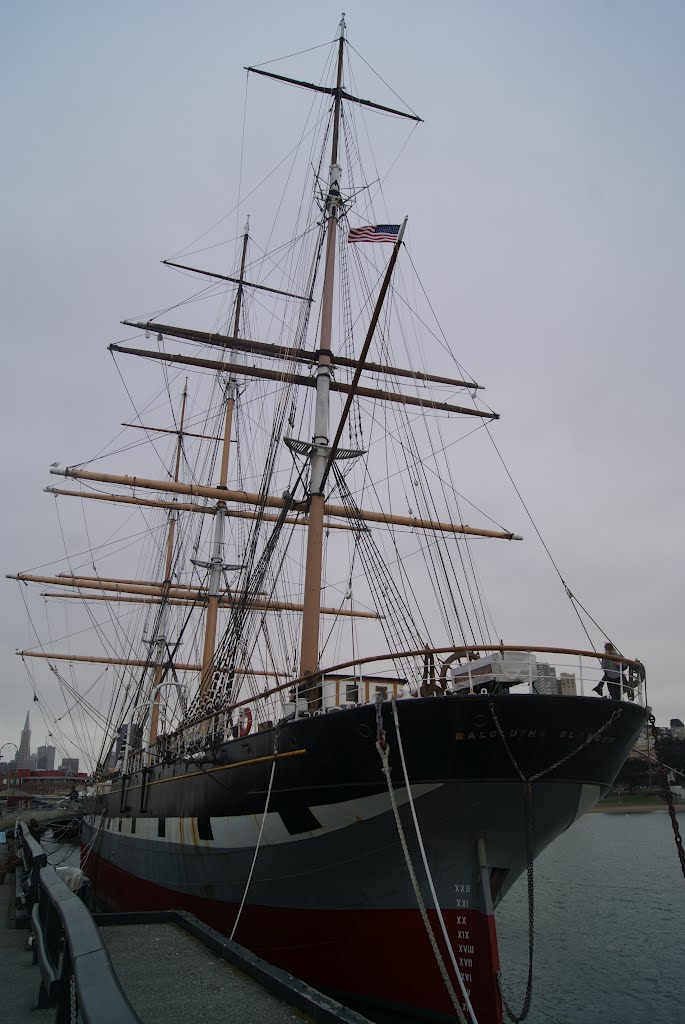
Stern and mizzenmast, January 15, 2012

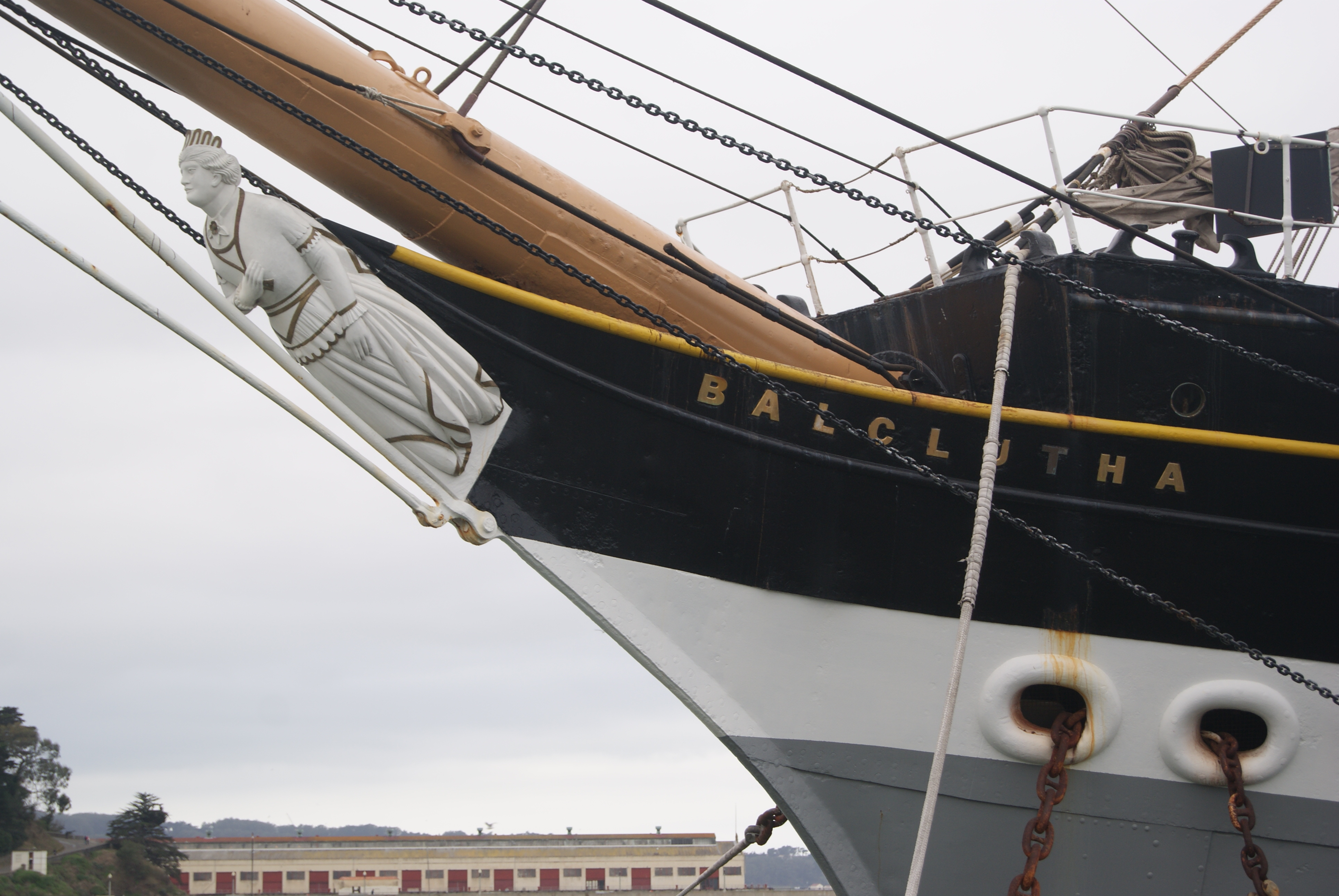
Bow figurehead, and January 15, 2012

Deck Plan

== See also ==
- List of large sailing vessels
