= The Astral (novel) =

2011 novel by Kate Christensen

- Author: Kate Christensen
- Language: English
- Genre: Fiction
- Published: 2011 (Doubleday)
- Publication place: United States
- Media type: Print (Hardback)
- Pages: 311
- ISBN: 9780385530910
- OCLC: 666230046

The Astral is a 2011 novel by Kate Christensen. It is about a poet, Harry Quirk, who having been thrown out of the family apartment at the Astral by his wife Luz, attempts to get his life back together.

== Reception ==
Daniel Handler, reviewing The Astral in The New York Times, called it "an object lesson on the current realist novel, with its pitfalls and pleasures both as clear as the book’s unsentimental vision." and concluded "the realist novel believes that we are, all of us ordinary people in our ordinary lives, enchanted already. .. But then when I open a novel, I expect something other than the ordinary circumstances that already surround me, be it in language or story. I think most readers do. To expect otherwise, as Christensen does in “The Astral,” seems a little, well, unrealistic." The Washington Post found "that Christensen has somehow — again — created a captivatingly believable male narrator".

The Astral has also been reviewed by Booklist, Library Journal, BookPage Reviews, Kirkus Reviews, and Publishers Weekly.
