= Alaska Packers' Association =

Defunct American canned salmon manufacturer

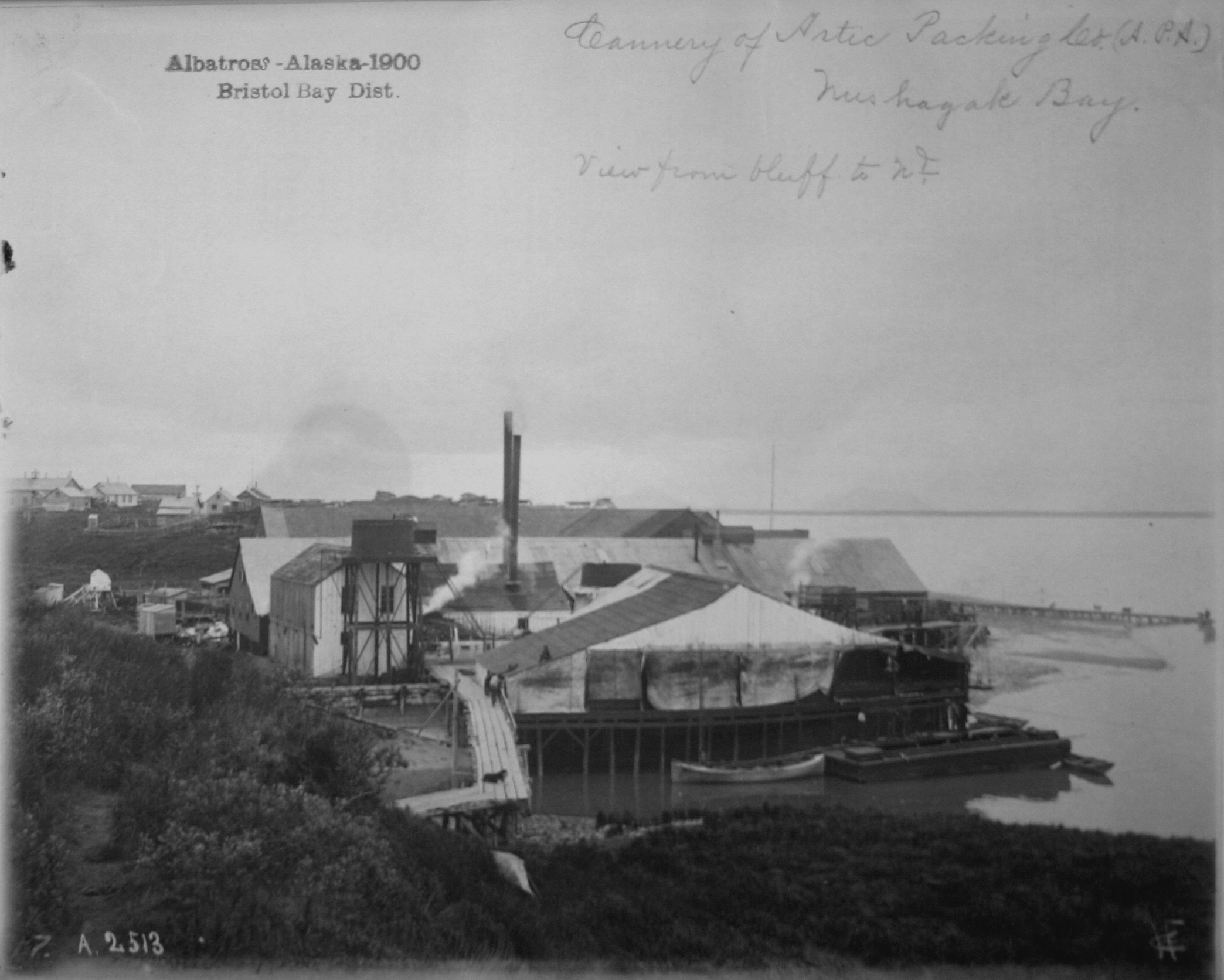
APA cannery, Arctic Packing Co., Nushagak Bay, 1900

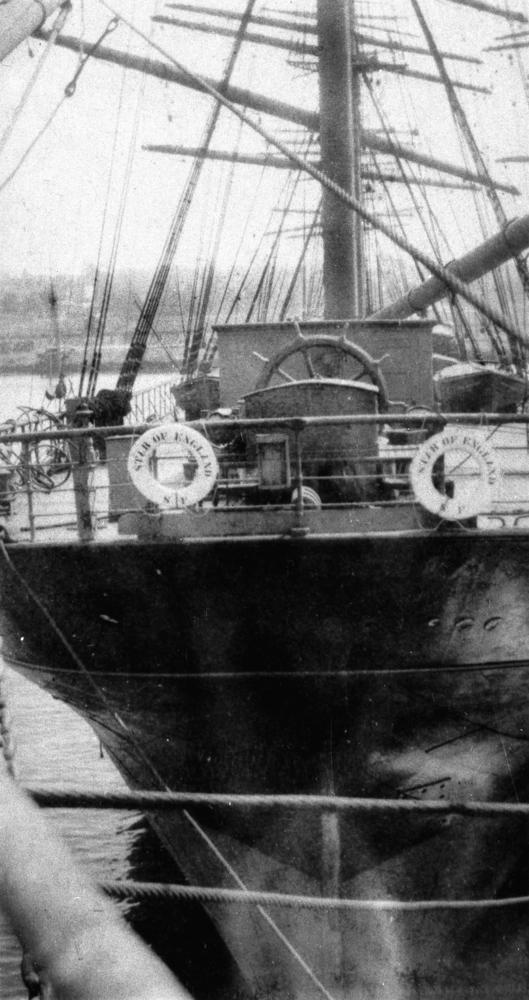
Star of England, APA ship

The Alaska Packers' Association (APA) was a San Francisco-based manufacturer of Alaska canned salmon founded in 1891 and sold in 1982. As the largest salmon packer in Alaska, the member canneries of APA were active in local affairs, and had considerable political influence. The Alaska Packers' Association is best known for operating the "Star Fleet," the last fleet of commercial sailing vessels on the West Coast of North America, as late as 1927.

== Foundation ==
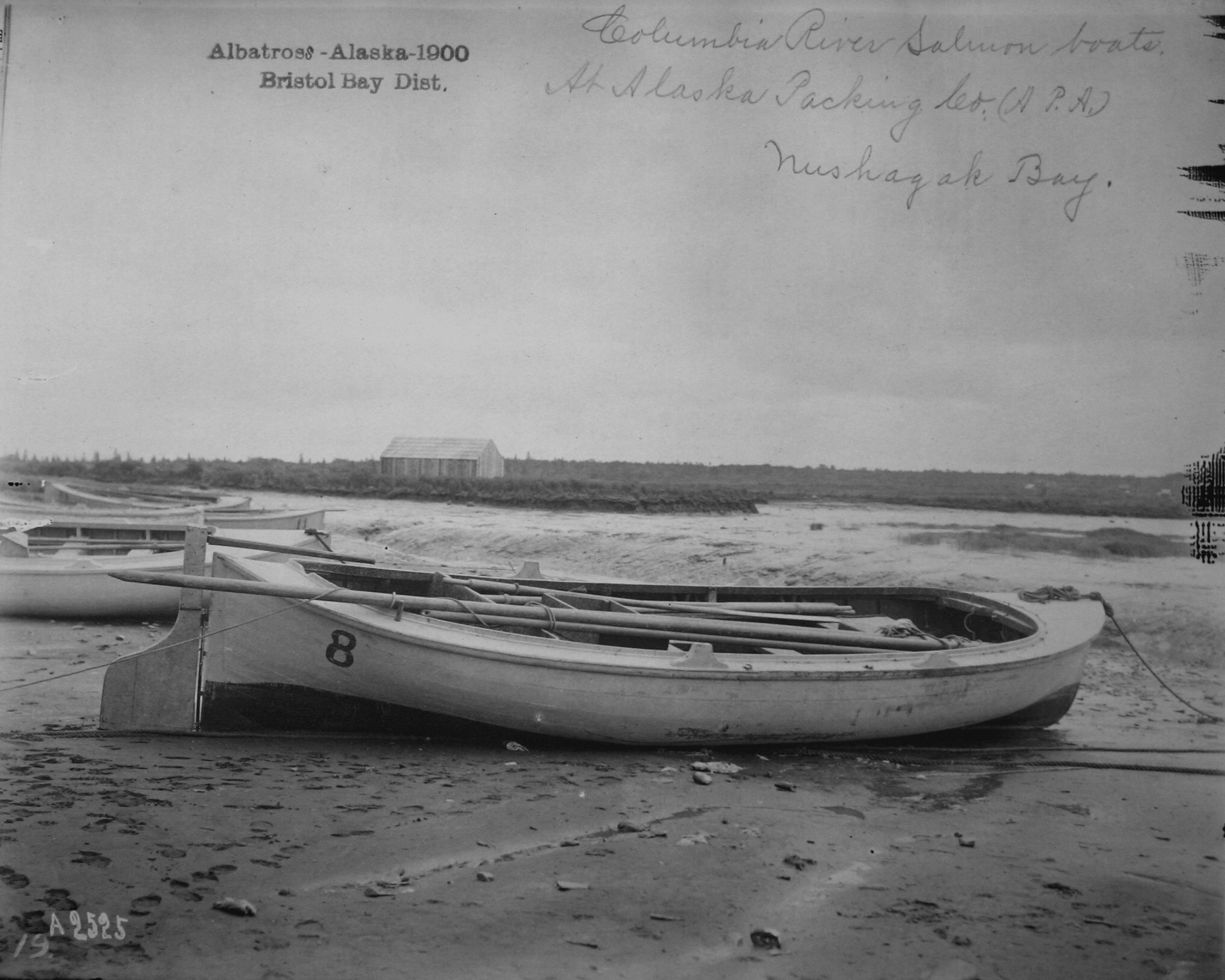
Salmon boats at APA cannery, Nushagak Bay, 1900

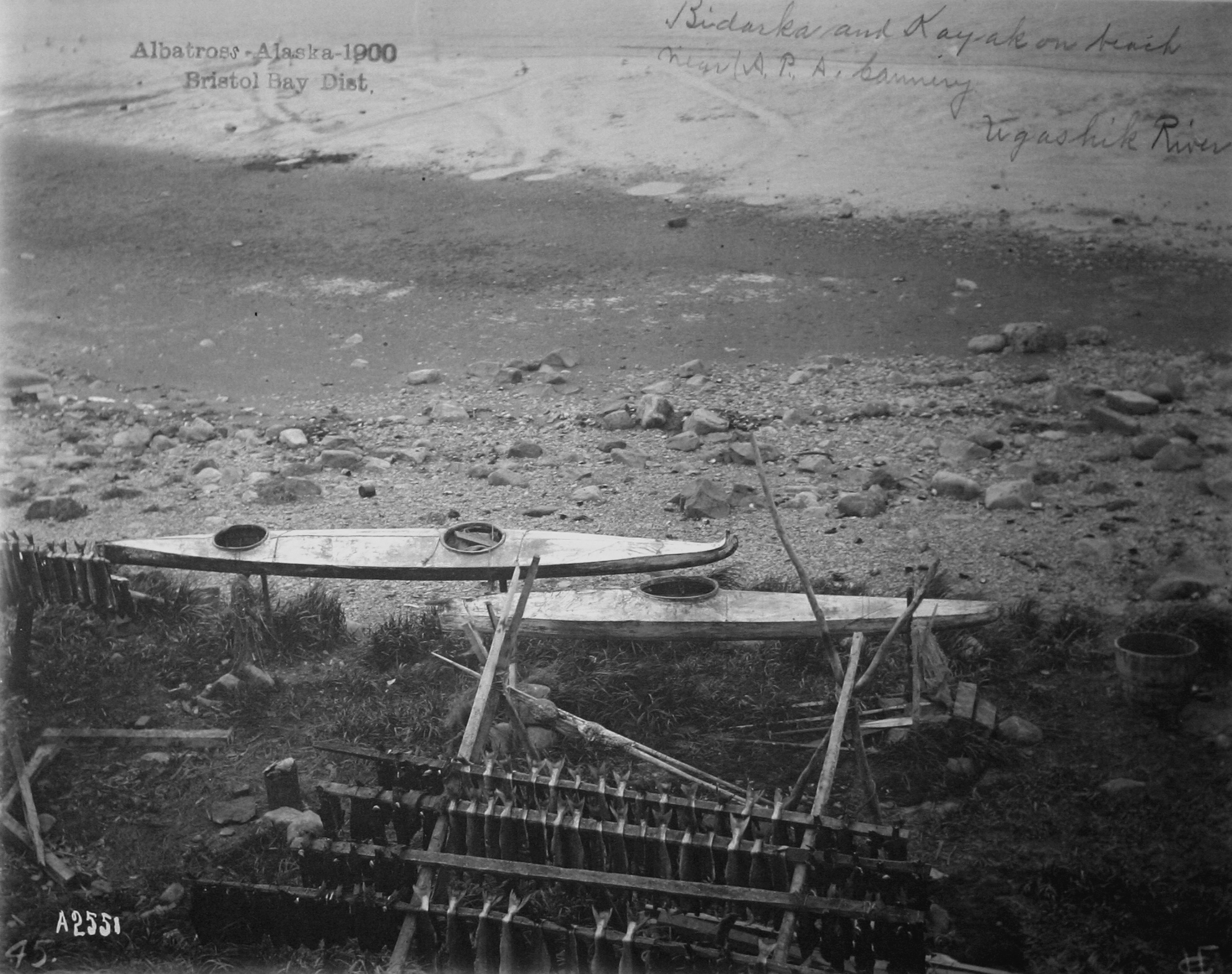
Baidarka kayak near APA cannery, Ugashik River, 1900

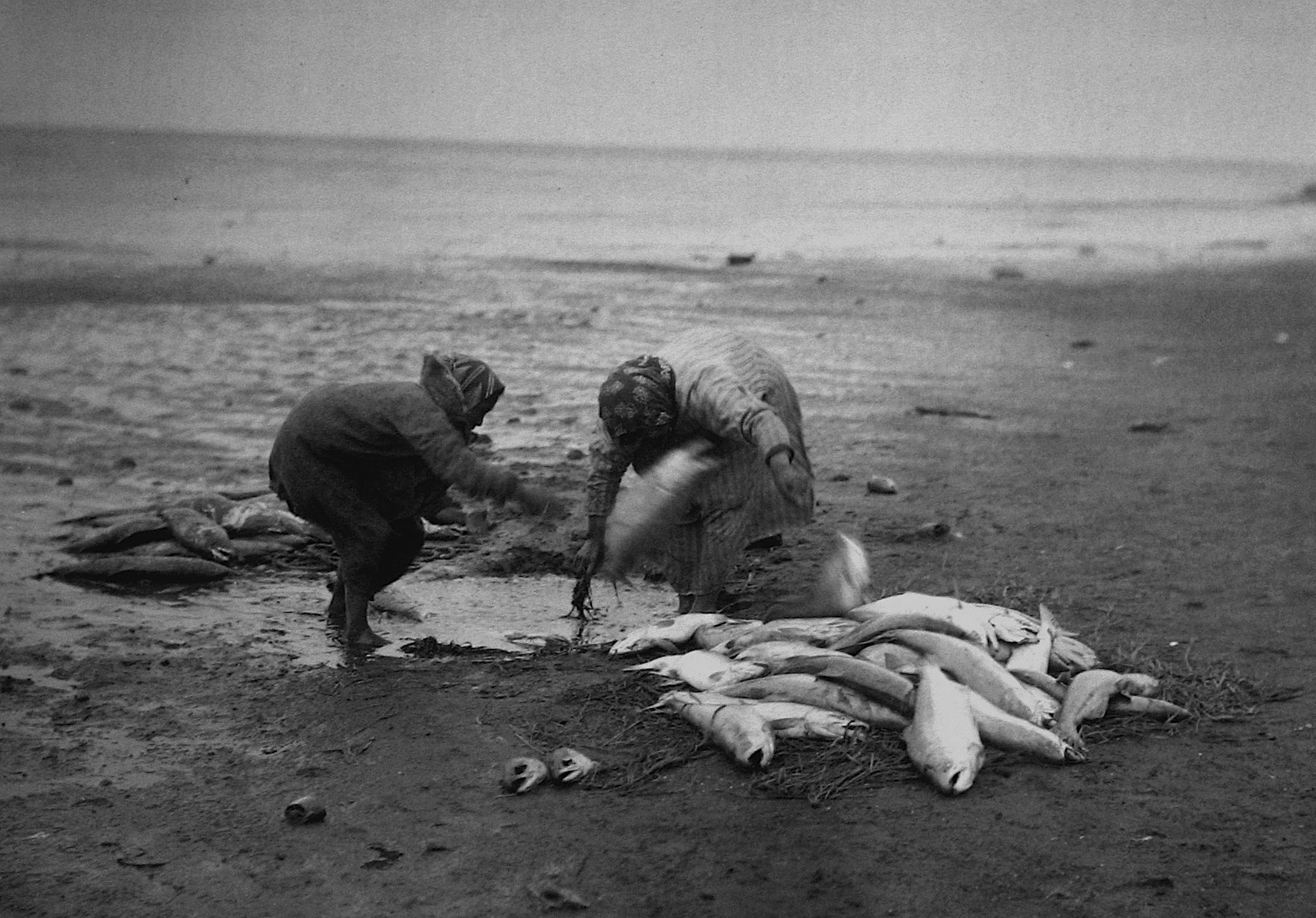
Indigenous women cleaning salmon on beach near the APA cannery on Ugashik River, 1900

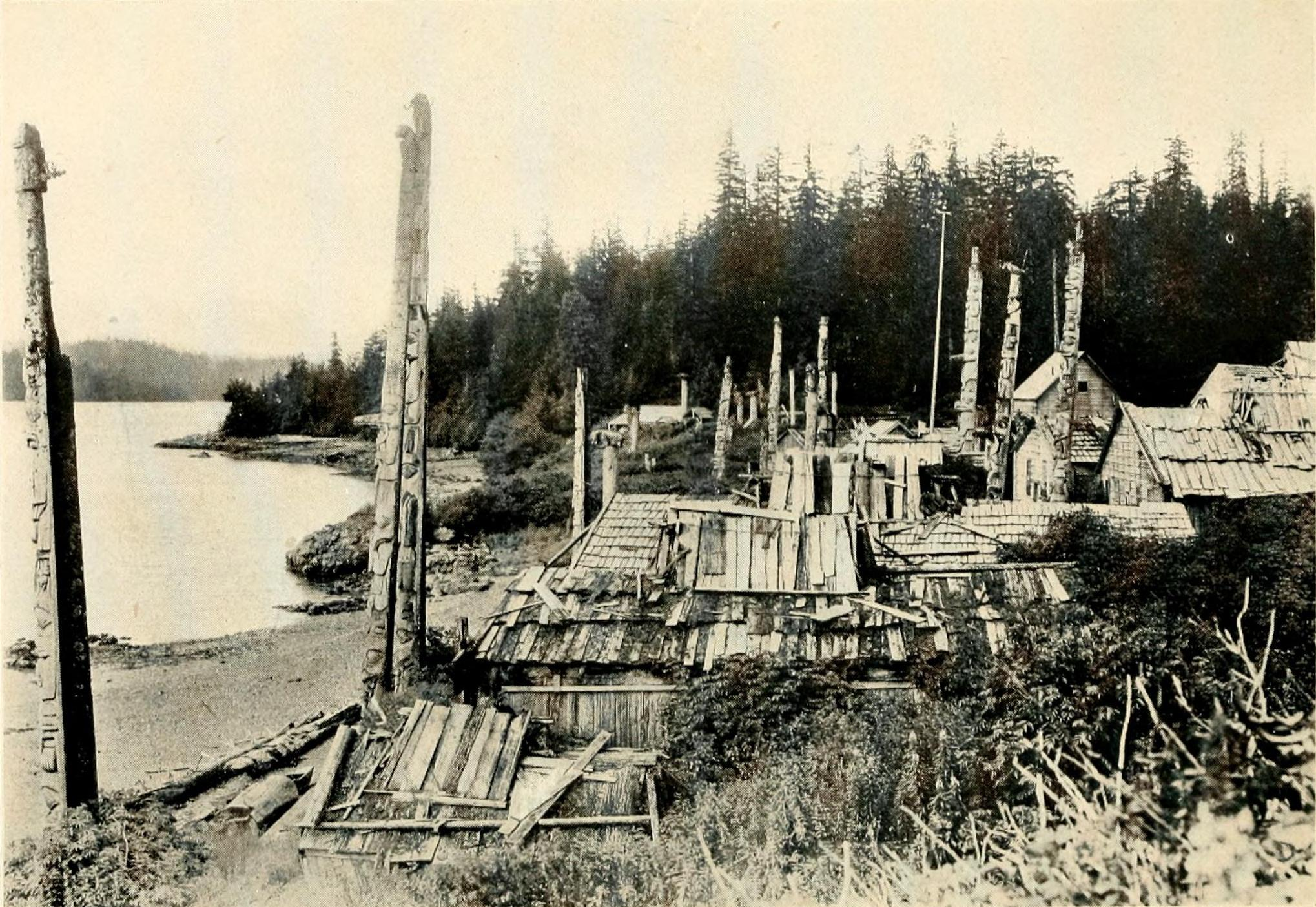
Haida village abandoned around 1902, when people left to take cannery jobs

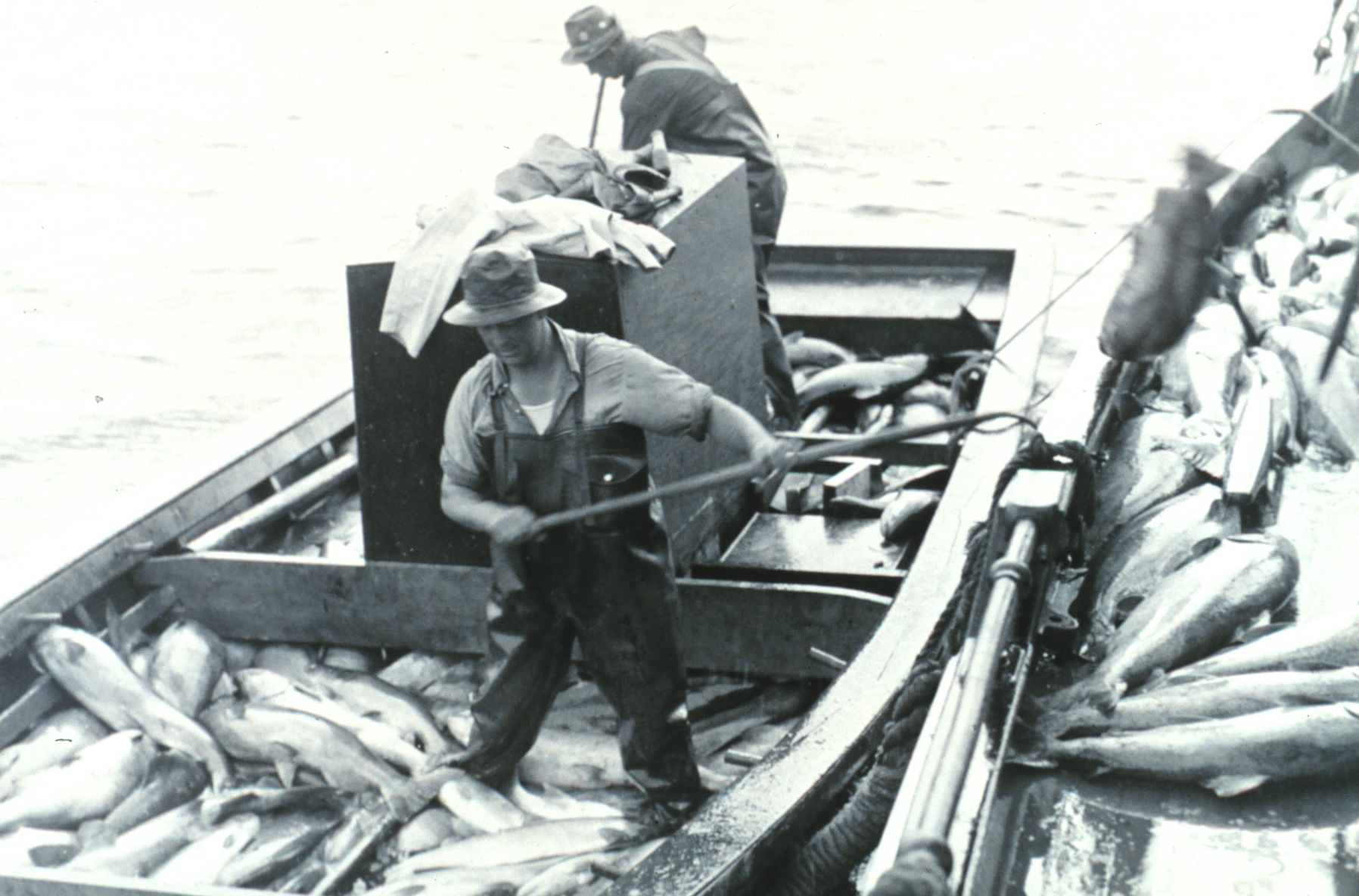
Loading salmon, circa 1938

The APA was formed in 1891 when the Alaska salmon industry was in its infancy but already produced more canned salmon than the market could bear. The association was initially formed to sell off the surplus pack and it proved so successful that it incorporated in 1892 as the Alaska Packing Association to better manage canned salmon production to meet demand. Of the original 31 member canneries across Alaska, 9 were idled that year. With minor changes, the association reincorporated as the Alaska Packers Association in 1893.

Henry Frederick Fortmann (1856–1946), owner of the Arctic Packing Company, one of the original member companies, served as APA president from its inception until 1922 and remained on the board until his death. Other presidents included William Timson and A.K. Tichenor.

== Expansion ==
As the industry later expanded, the APA emerged as the largest salmon packer in Alaska with canneries that stretched from Bristol Bay, Chignik, Karluk, Cook Inlet, and the Southeast Alaska panhandle. The company's various canneries were identified as "Diamonds" followed by an initial including: the Diamond NC was their Clark's Point, Alaska cannery (after its originator the Nushagak Canning Co.), the Diamond E (Egegik), Diamond J and X (Kvichak River) Diamond W (Wrangell). On their boats and frequently in company correspondence the word diamond was not used but a diamond was drawn around the cannery initial. The Diamond NC cannery in Clark's Point, built in 1888 is still in existence but has not been used as a cannery since 1950. The Diamond M and Diamond O cannery in South Naknek built in 1895 is still in operation today.

Canned salmon was then as the largest industry in Alaska and produced over 80% of the territory's tax revenues. The APA wielded considerable clout in the territorial capital Juneau and Washington DC, where the fishery was regulated by the Bureau of Commercial Fisheries in the US Department of Commerce. The absentee control of a major industry and the APA's dominant role provoked resentment among many Alaskans who viewed the industry as greedy, selfish and ruthless. Alaska Territorial Rep. Dan Sutherland reviled the APA as "the great monopolists of Bristol Bay."

The APA used its clout to lessen the impacts of salmon regulations on the industry and reap other benefits. The company operated salmon hatcheries near Karluk and Loring and took tax credits for the salmon smolt that were released. In 1907, the APA canned over $3 million worth of salmon and thanks to credits for hatchery releases that totaled over $32,000, owed just 32 cents in taxes, a bill they paid for with stamps.

To its credit, the APA came to the aid of Alaskans when needed. Its cannery hospitals provided medical care for neighboring Native residents and when the worldwide Spanish flu pandemic ravaged western Alaska in the spring of 1919, the APA helped bury the hundreds of dead, and provided care for the ill and orphaned children, even when the federal government did little to render aid. After a Navy Lieutenant inspected the situation in Bristol Bay and reported the conditions as "satisfactory," the APA's Kvichak cannery superintendent J. C. Bell retorted, "We have not been able to fathom whether the conditions are satisfactory for them or the natives who are dead and buried … and as usual the job is up to the Alaska Packers Association."

== Mergers and acquisitions ==
In 1916, Alaska Packers Association, Griffin & Skelley, Central California Canneries, J. K. Armsby Co., and California Fruit Canners Association merged to form California Packing Corporation (CalPack), a company involved in canned fruits and vegetables and Hawaiian pineapple, and later reorganized as Del Monte Foods after the name of its premier brand. The APA later moved its headquarters to the Seattle area.

The company generally prospered through the 1930s as salmon production grew but many Alaska canneries were idled during World War II and never reopened. During World War II Alaska Packers' Association operated Merchant navy ships for the United States Shipping Board. During World War II Alaska Packers' Association was active with charter shipping with the Maritime Commission and War Shipping Administration.

Alaska Packers' Association operated Liberty ships and other ships for the merchant navy. The ship was run by its Alaska Packers' Association and the US Navy supplied United States Navy Armed Guards to man the deck guns and radio. Example ships operated: USS Alkes, SS Louis A. Sengteller, and SS Joseph Smith, which sank in 1944.

After the war, salmon runs declined for a variety of reasons including past overfishing, lax management and a general downturn in salmon survival due to a change in long-term climate cycles known as the Pacific decadal oscillation. Many APA canneries were 50 years old and in need of major modernization but CalPack accountants questioned the investment in rebuilding canneries when salmon runs were in decline and consumers' tastes were turning from salmon to more cheap and abundant tuna.

Alaska salmon production remained generally poor throughout the 1950s, 60s, and early 70s, by which time the company sought out. In 1982, when salmon runs showed signs of resurgence, most of the APA's assets were sold to ConAgra of Omaha, Nebraska for an undisclosed amount. Many of these properties in Bristol Bay have since been acquired by Trident Seafoods.

== The Star Fleet ==
The APA is perhaps best remembered for operating one of the last fleets of tall ships. Although this invoked the romance of the days of sail, reliance on wind rather than steam was a way for the company to economize. The salmon packing industry was a very seasonal business and old sailing ships were relatively cheap and available. Shortly after the turn of the 20th century, the APA began to replace its wooden ships with iron-hulled vessels by purchasing a number of ships built by Harland & Wolff Co. for James P. Corry and Co.'s Star Line. APA purchased the following ships (in order of build) from others who had purchased from James P. Corry and Co. - Star of Italy, Star of Russia, Star of Bengal and Star of France. The first of these vessels bought by the APA was the Star of Russia. The company liked the naming pattern used for the Star Line's ships so much that it used this pattern for the naming of its other vessels, naming them Star of Alaska, Star of Finland, etc. By 1930, most of the sailing ships were replaced with steam or diesel powered ships.

Alaska's notorious weather resulted in a number of accidents involving the sailing ships, most notably the sinking of the Star of Bengal on September 20, 1908. The vessel was towed from Wrangell, Alaska with the full cannery crew and over 52,000 cases or 2.5 million 1-pound cans of salmon on board. Upon reaching the outer coast, a gale blew up. The towboats cut their lines and the vessel's anchors dragged. The 262 foot ship broke up on the rocks of Coronation Island and 111 people died, mostly Chinese and Japanese cannery workers.

In 1927, the APA still owned fourteen square-rigged sailing vessels in its "Star Fleet" of which only two remain. The Star of India is now ported at the San Diego Maritime Museum. The Star of Alaska, originally named the Balclutha, was given back its original name and is ported in San Francisco as part of the Maritime National Historical Park.

The Star of Russia now lies in 40 metres of water in Port Vila harbor, Vanuatu and is a popular dive site. Other ships in this series that are no longer afloat include the Star of Bengal, Star of England, Star of Falkland, Star of Finland, Star of France, Star of Greenland, Star of Holland, Star of Iceland, Star of Italy, Star of Lapland, Star of Poland, Star of Scotland, Star of Shetland, and Star of Zealand.

Gallery of the Star Fleet

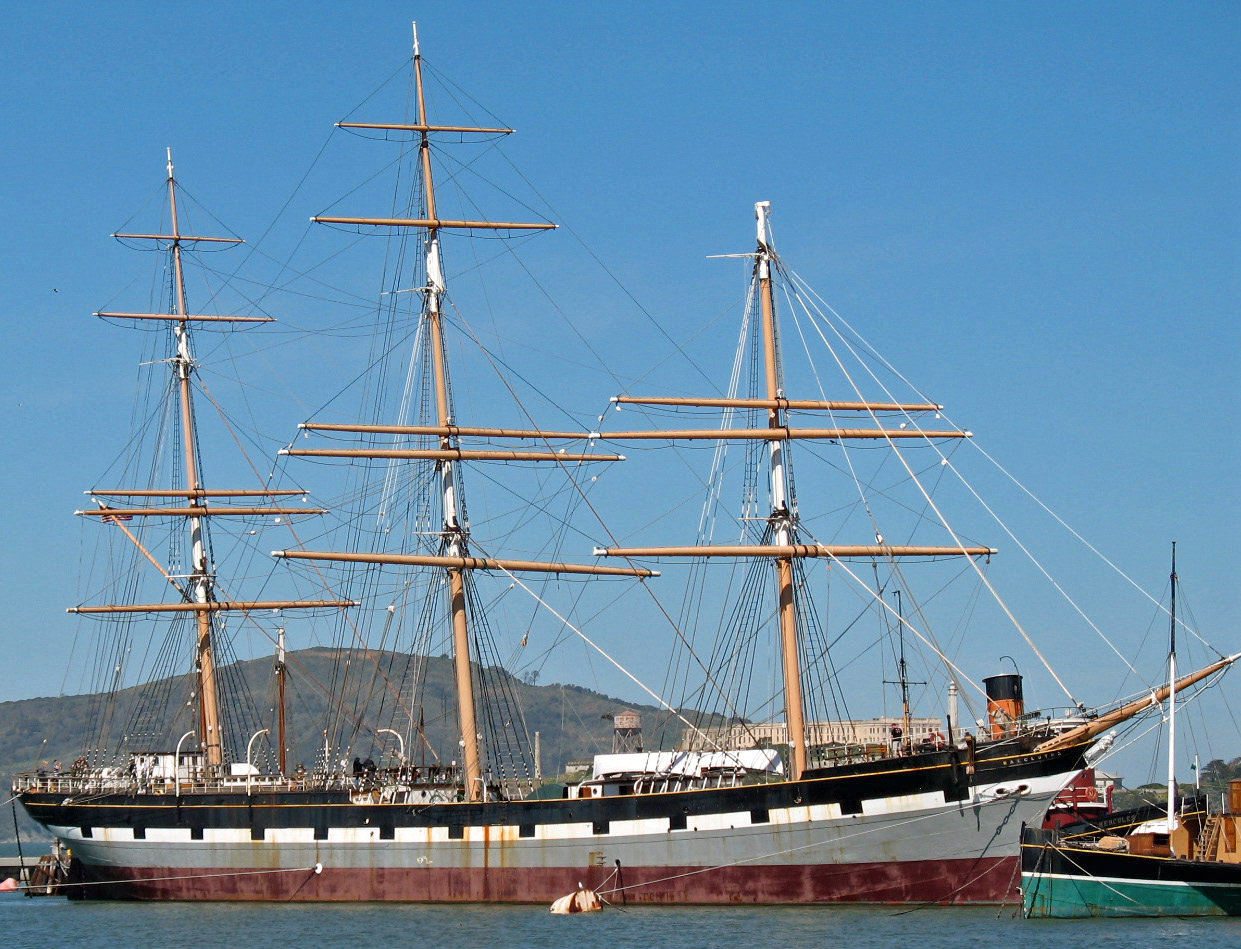
Star of Alaska, now museum ship Balclutha

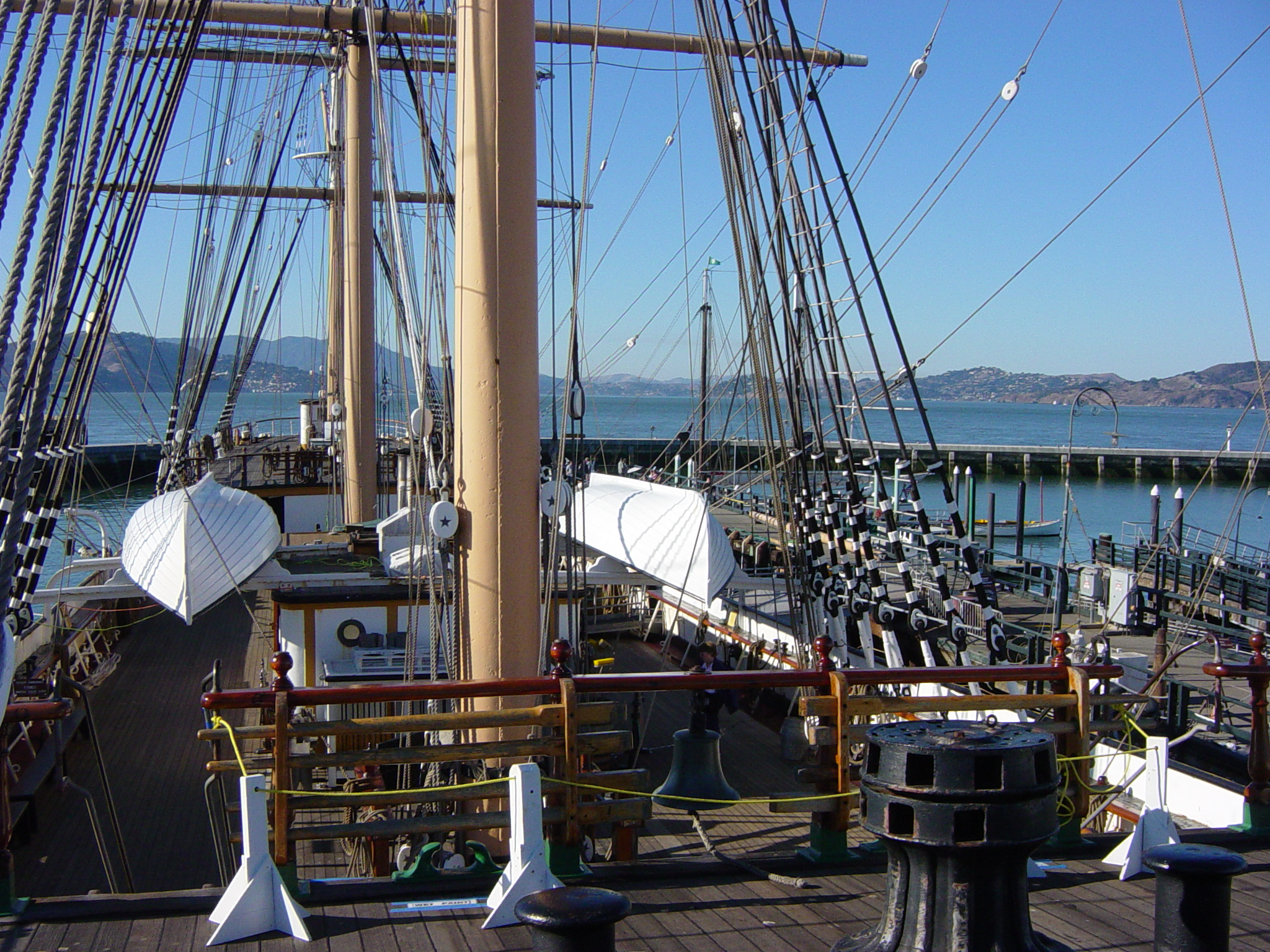
Deck of Balclutha in Maritime National Historical Park, 2005

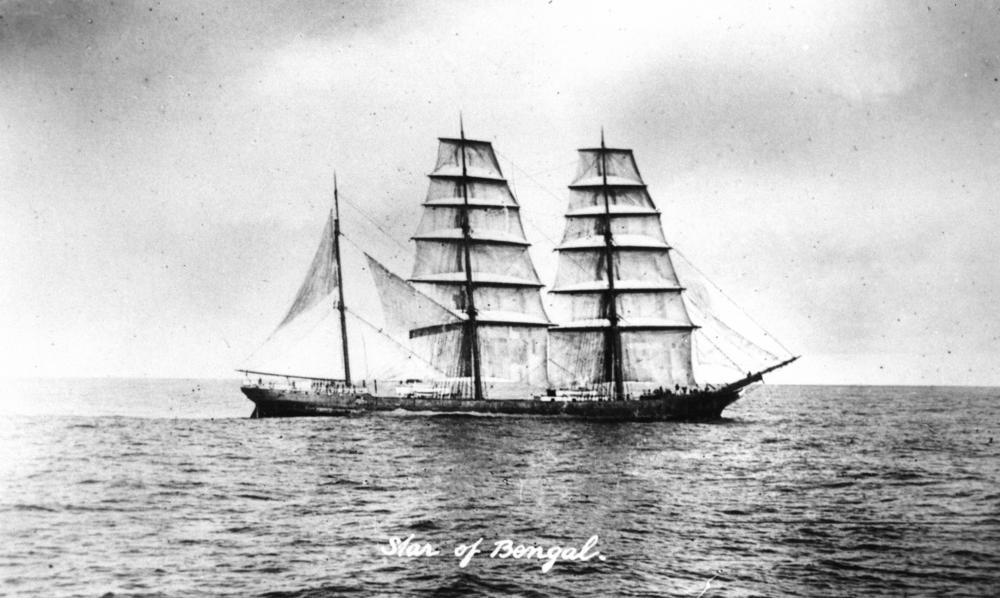
Star of Bengal

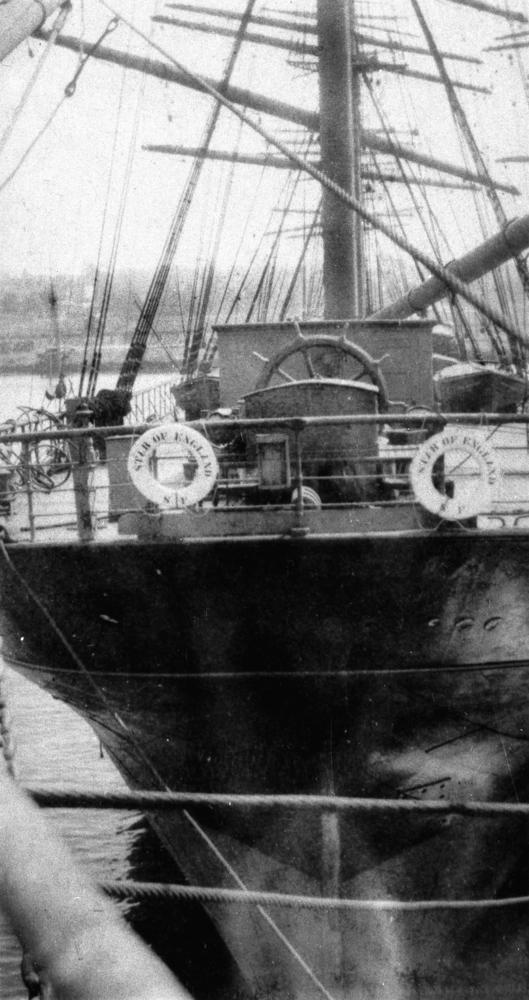
Star of England

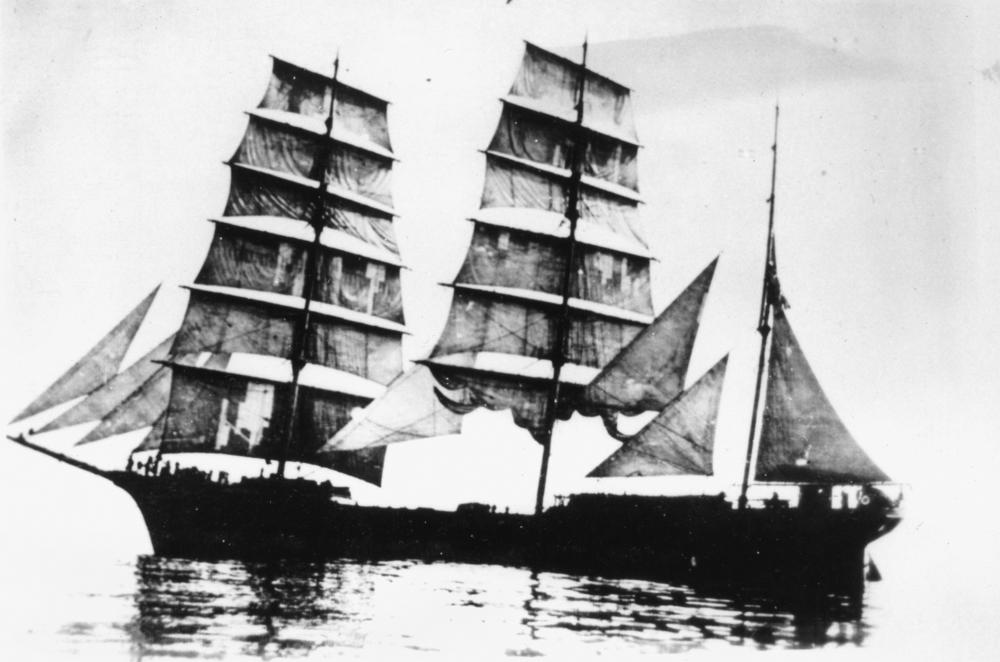
Star of Finland

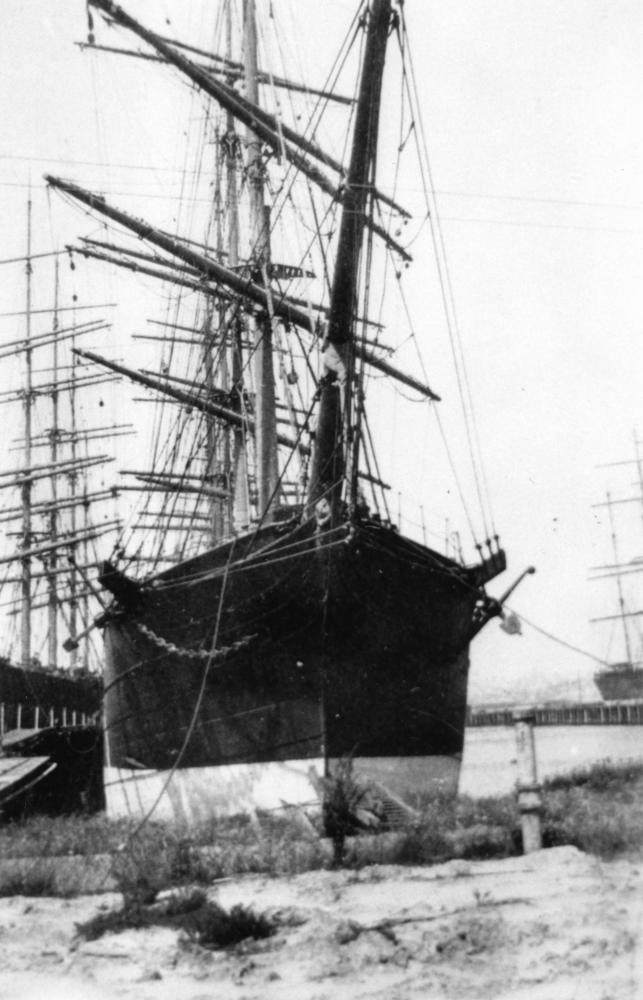
Bow of Star of France

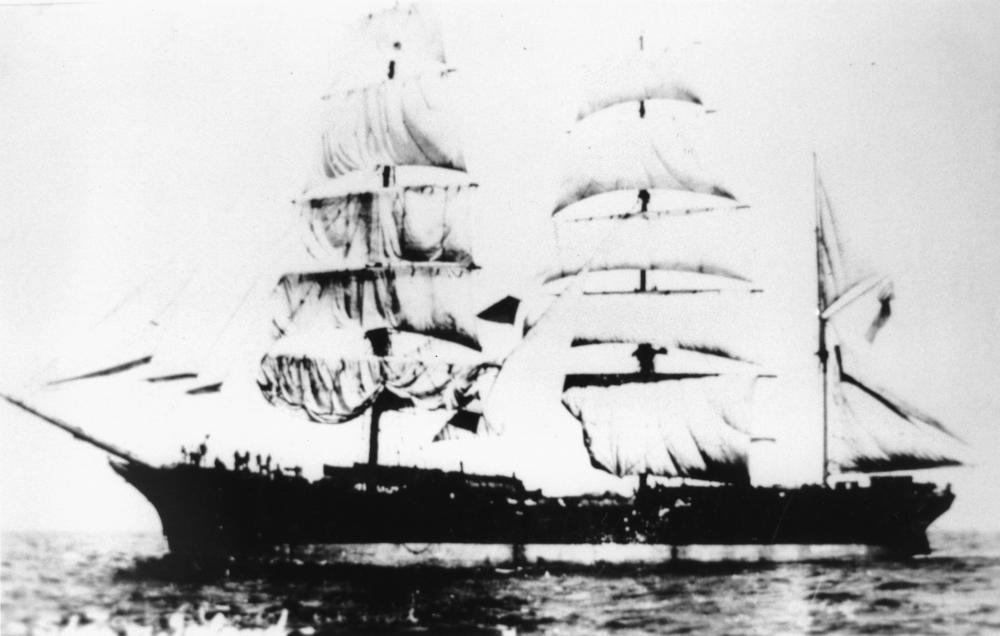
Star of Iceland

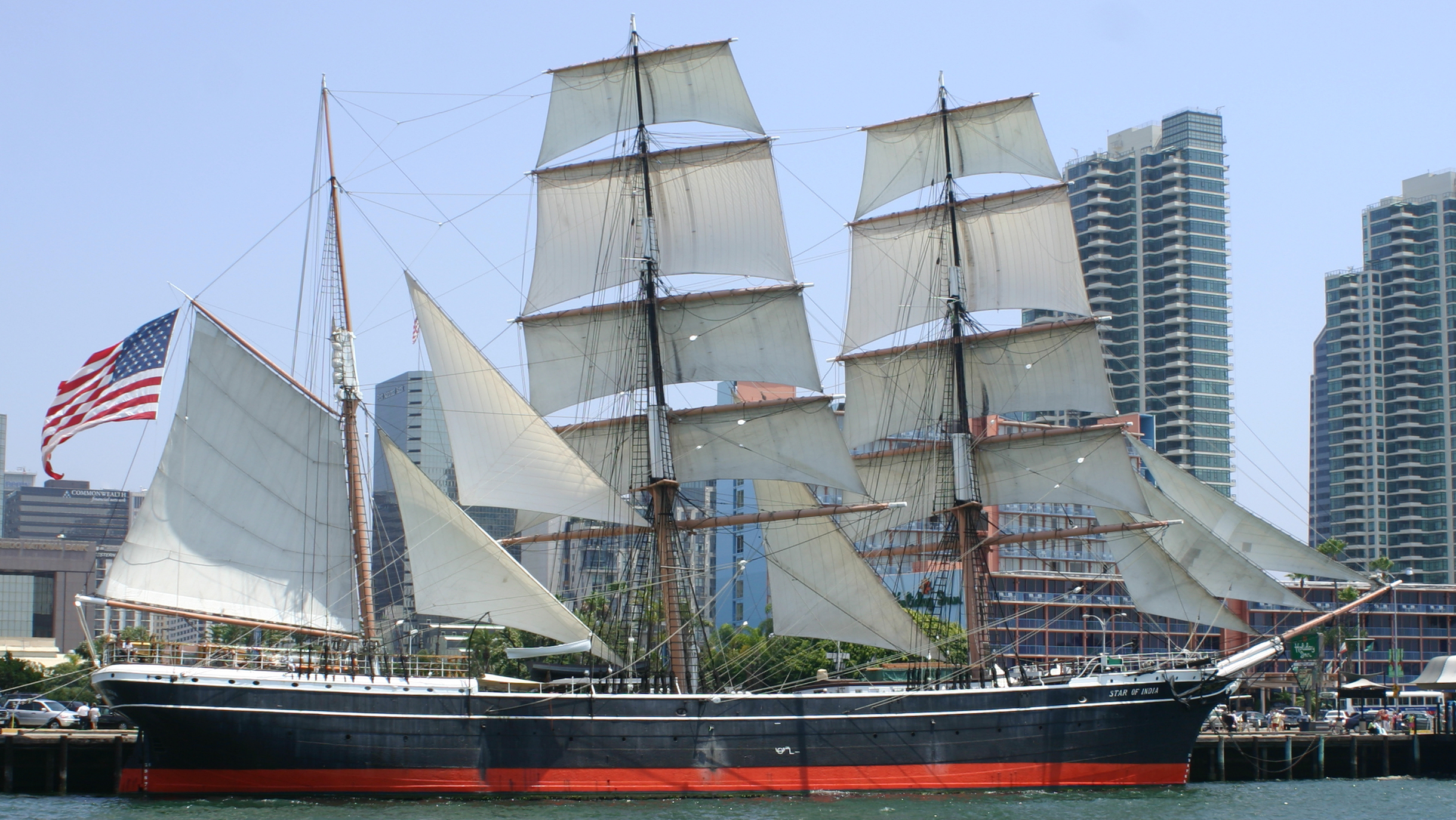
Star of India docked in San Diego, 2005

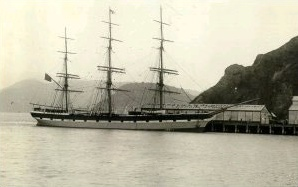
Star of India in 1883

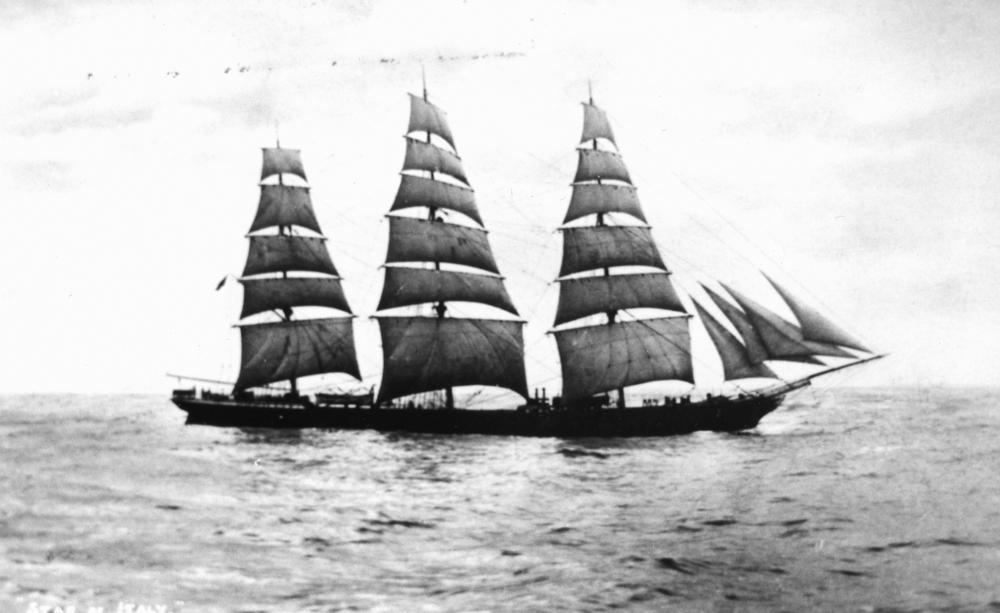
Star of Italy

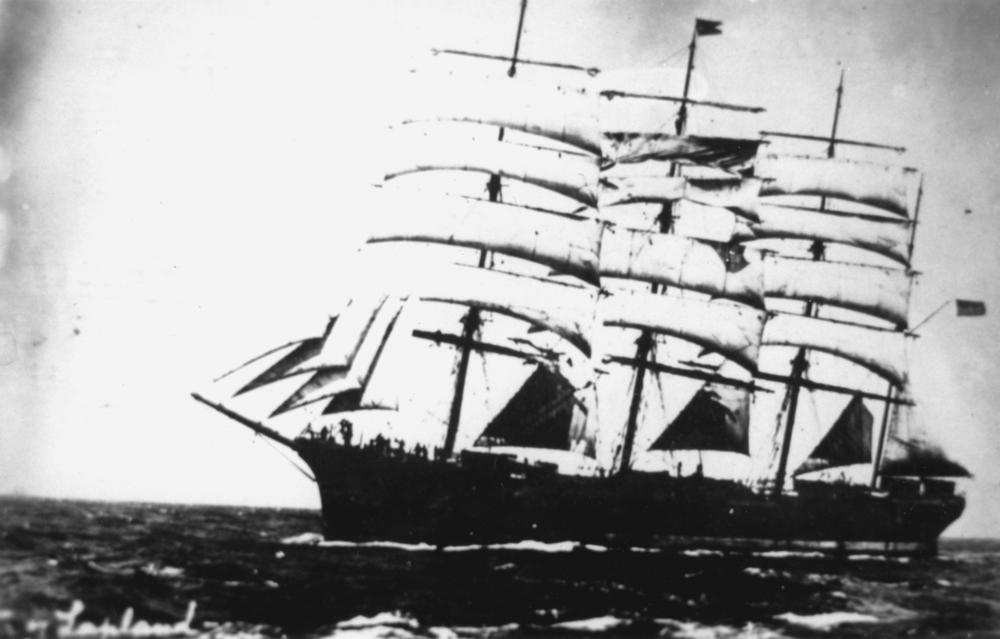
Star of Lapland

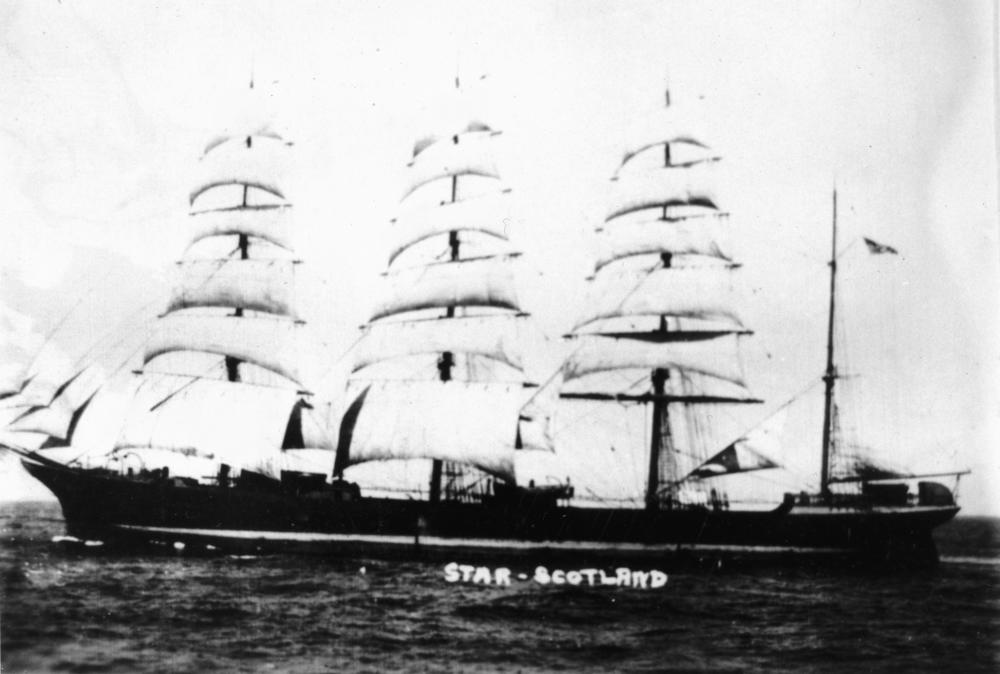
Star of Scotland

== Current status ==
The name APA is now used by the Seattle-based At-Sea Processors Association. This trade association represents seven companies that own and operate 19 US flag catcher/processor vessels active in the Alaska pollock and West Coast Pacific whiting fisheries. At-Sea Processors Association has no connection to the earlier Alaska Packers' Association.
