= Blue Plate Special: An Autobiography of My Appetites =

2013 memoir by Kate Christensen

- Author: Kate Christensen
- Language: English
- Genre: Memoir, Food writing
- Published: 2013 (Doubleday)
- Publication place: USA
- Media type: Print (Hardback)
- Pages: 353
- ISBN: 9780385536264
- OCLC: 823860695

Blue Plate Special: An Autobiography of My Appetites is a 2013 memoir by Kate Christensen from when she was a girl growing up in Berkeley, California and Tempe, Arizona in the 1960s, to Paris, Oregon, Iowa, and New York City to the present-day in Maine, New England.

== Reception ==
The New York Journal of Books, in a review of Blue Plate Special, called it "remarkable" and compared it to the writings of Laurie Colwin: "If Colwin is the All American Girl Cook, Ms. Christensen is more wild, plunging into worldly episodes from Bedouins baking dough disks on hot rocks for breakfast in the desert to daylong meals during a cold Maine winter." The New York Times found it "a paean to cooking and food, from the homey to the haute" and "a toothsome blend of personal and social history."

Blue Plate Special has also been reviewed by Publishers Weekly, Kirkus Reviews, The Wall Street Journal, Library Journal, Booklist, and The Christian Science Monitor.
