= Trouble (novel) =

Book by Kate Christensen

- Author: Kate Christensen
- Language: English
- Genre: Fiction
- Published: 2009 (Doubleday)
- Publication place: USA
- Media type: Print (Hardback)
- Pages: 311
- ISBN: 9780385527309
- OCLC: 235945923

Trouble is a 2009 novel by Kate Christensen. It is about two 40-something friends, Josie from New York and Raquel from Los Angeles, and their adventures in Mexico City.

== Reception ==
The New York Times, in a review of Trouble, called it "a terse and tough little novel" but also wrote "Readers love trouble, too, and “Trouble” doesn't have enough of it. The best part of this novel comes early on .. Over the border, the tension of the novel is forsaken, and it becomes little more than a travelogue, reducing particular lives to anonymous dots. For a writer, that's real trouble."

Library Journal was less critical, writing "The compelling plot will keep readers turning pages, even as clouds of tension and despair drift ever closer.", and Booklist wrote "Bewitching readers with a narcotic blend of eroticism and suspense, Christensen raises unsettling questions about our inability to understand ourselves or others and marvels over our consuming fascination with ritualized confrontation, whether it's the voraciousness of the paparazzi or the ancient drama of the bullfight." BookPage Reviews found it "a smart and sexy look at the way libido plays into the female midlife crisis", and concluded "Still, it's refreshing to read about middle-aged women who are given not only agency, but also vivacity and desire.,

Trouble has also been reviewed by The Washington Post, Kirkus Reviews, the Los Angeles Times, Publishers Weekly, and The Daily Beast.
