= ASTRAL propagation model =

Underwater sound propagation loss model

The Astral propagation model is an underwater sound propagation loss model. It began as a model for predicting range-smoothed (over 30–40 nm) propagation loss (PL) in a range dependent environment in the late 1970s and was developed by C. W. Spoffard. A convergence zone and surface duct capability was added in the mid-1980s, after which it underwent testing by the US Navy along with range dependent Raymode and the Parabolic Equation (PE) model. As a result of these tests, ASTRAL became one of the official US Navy's range dependent PL models along with PE.
