= Kate Christensen =

American novelist

- Education: Reed College; Iowa Writers' Workshop
- Occupation: Novelist
- Website: katechristensen.net

Kate Christensen is an American novelist. She won the 2008 PEN/Faulkner Award for Fiction for her fourth novel, The Great Man, about a painter and the three women in his life. Her eleventh novel, Good Company, is forthcoming from HarperCollins in June 2026. She is also the author of two food-related memoirs, Blue Plate Special (Doubleday, 2013) and How to Cook a Moose (Islandport Press, 2015), the latter of which won the 2016 Maine Literary Award for memoir.

She is a graduate of Reed College and the Iowa Writers' Workshop. Her essays, articles, reviews, and stories have appeared in many anthologies and periodicals.

== Works ==
=== Fiction ===
- In the Drink, Doubleday, 1999, ISBN 9780385494502
- Jeremy Thrane, Broadway, 2001, ISBN 9780767908016
- The Epicure's Lament, Doubleday, 2004, ISBN 9780767910309
- The Great Man, Doubleday, 2007, ISBN 9780385518451
- Trouble, Doubleday, 2009, ISBN 9780385527309
- The Astral, Doubleday, 2011, ISBN 9780385530910
- The Last Cruise, Doubleday, 2018, ISBN 9780385536288
- Welcome Home, Stranger, 2023
- The Arizona Triangle (as Sydney Graves), 2024
- The Sacred & the Divine, 2025
- Good Company, 2026
- Saguaro City (as Sydney Graves), TBA

=== Non-fiction ===
- Blue Plate Special: An Autobiography of My Appetites, Doubleday, 2013, ISBN 9780385536264
- How to Cook a Moose: A Culinary Memoir, Islandport Press, 2015, ISBN 9781939017734
