= Shipentine =

American sailing rig

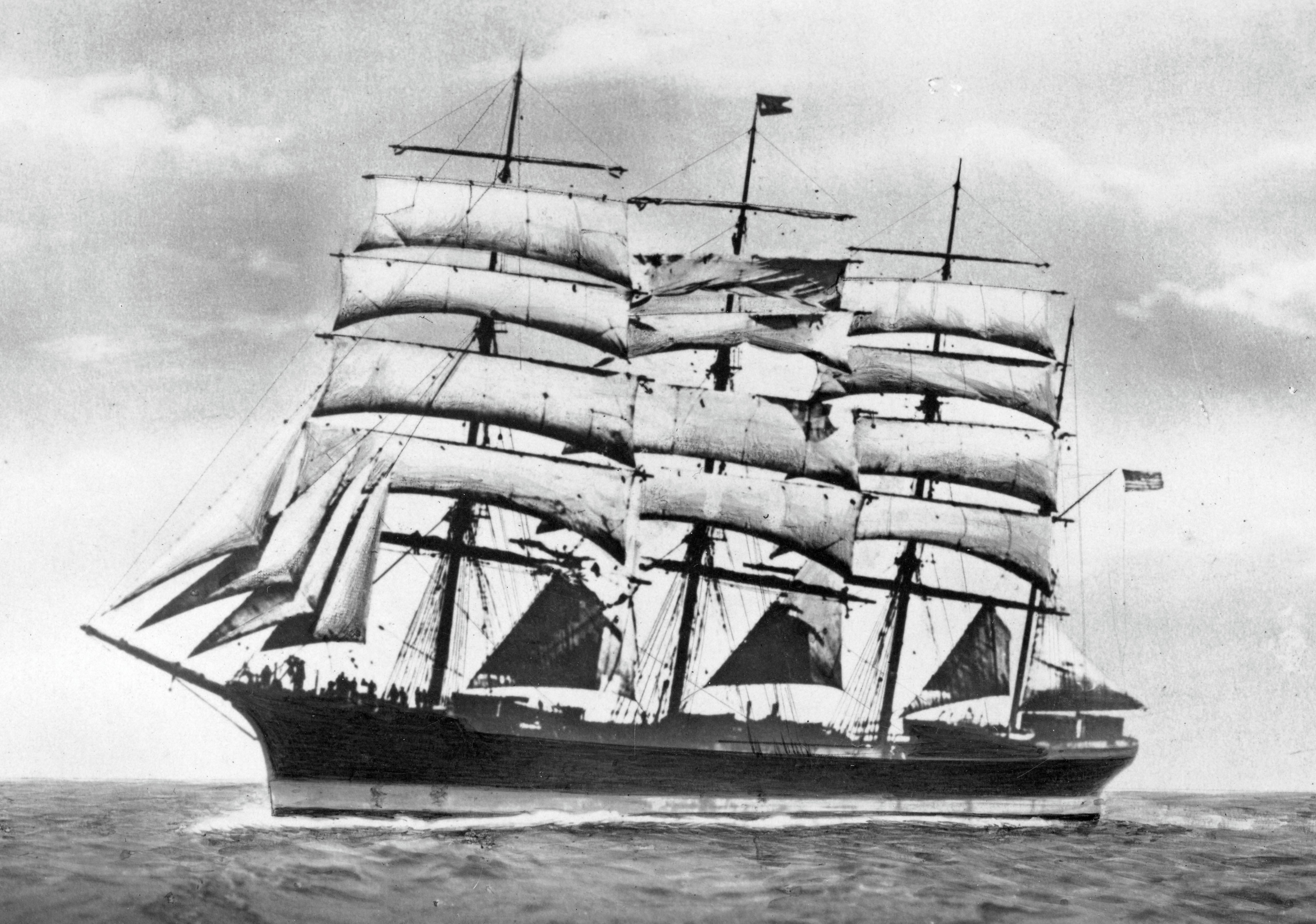
American shipentine Star of Lapland c. 1920

A shipentine (US: /ˈʃɪpənˌtin/) is a sailing vessel with three square-rigged masts and one stern-mounted mast with a fore-and-aft rig. The term was primarily used to describe American vessels that would otherwise be categorized as barques with four masts by British terminology. Unlike British counterparts, shipentines lacked exterior detail with no figureheads, plain sterns, and basic stems. While the first known instance of the term was in 1881, the name was popularized by the large American-built vessel Shenandoah in 1891 as part of an American rejection of seemingly counter-intuitive British nomenclature regarding what was considered a barque.

Similar to barkentines, the term is derived from the suffix "entine", referring to an abbreviated (simplified) rig, and the prefix "ship", which is a sailing vessel with at least three square-rigged masts.
