= 2009 in literature =

This article contains information about the literary events and publications of 2009.

== Events ==
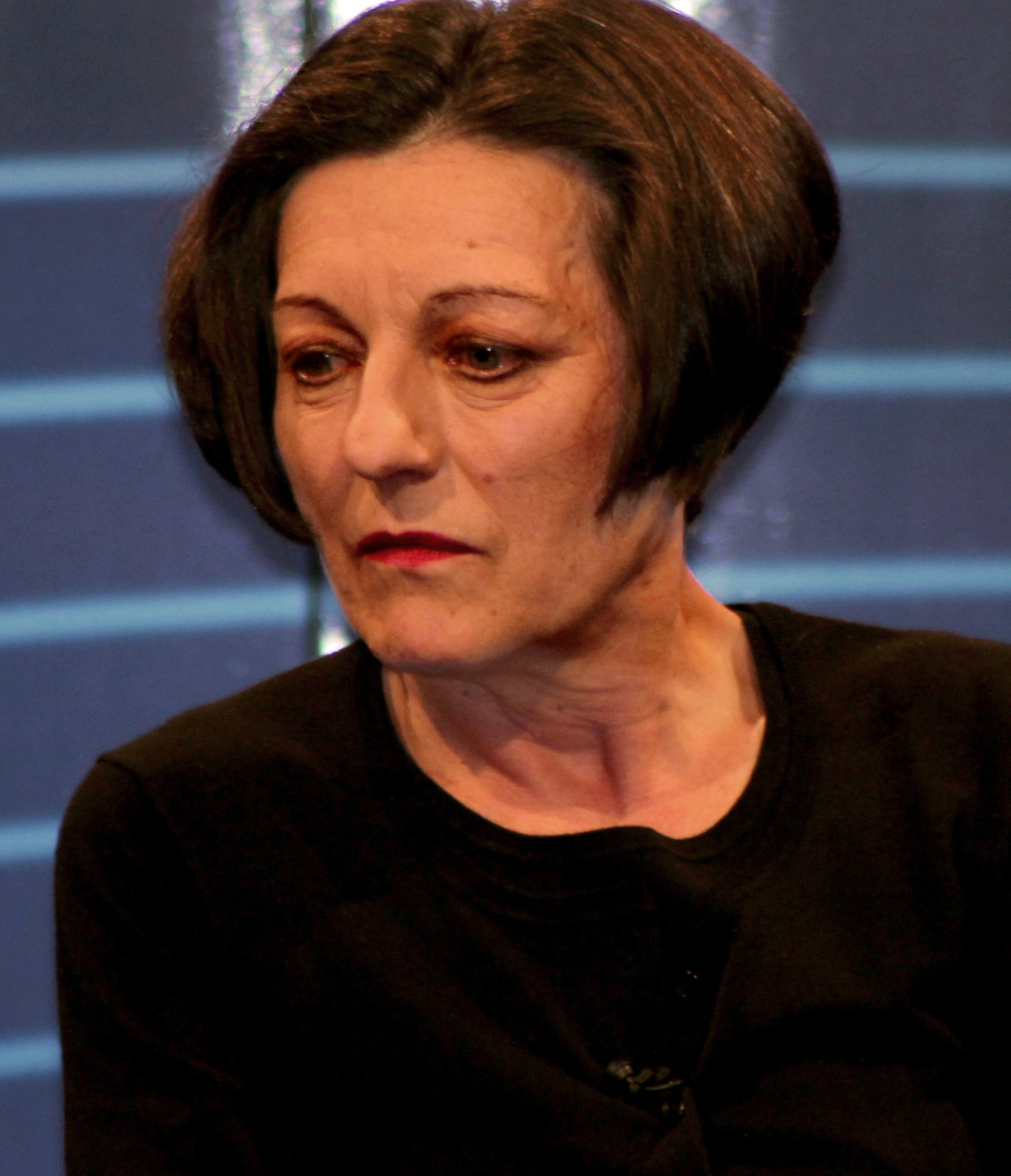
Herta Müller

- April 21 – UNESCO launches the World Digital Library.
- May 1 – Carol Ann Duffy is appointed Poet Laureate of the United Kingdom, the first woman in the position; she is also the first Scot and the first openly gay occupant of the post.
- May 5 – J. R. R. Tolkien's narrative poem The Legend of Sigurd and Gudrún in alliterative verse, based on the 13th century Poetic Edda and probably written in the 1930s, is published posthumously.
- May 16–25 – Ruth Padel becomes the first woman ever elected Professor of Poetry at the University of Oxford but resigns nine days later after it is alleged she was involved in what some sources call as a smear campaign against Derek Walcott, a rival for the post.
- June 25 – American pop singer Michael Jackson dies of an acute propofol intoxication at the age of 50.
- August 10 – Standard orthography for the Silesian language is adopted in Cieszyn, at a meeting of the Standardization Committee of the Silesian Language.
- October 8 – Romanian-born German novelist Herta Müller wins the 2009 Nobel Prize in Literature.
- October 12 – Jacob und Wilhelm Grimm-Zentrum Library opens at Humboldt University of Berlin.
- November 10 – Linden MacIntyre wins the 2009 Scotiabank Giller Prize for his novel The Bishop's Man.
- unknown date – Australian publisher Allen & Unwin suspends its annual Iremonger Award, stating that no manuscript of sufficient merit has been submitted.

== New books ==
=== Fiction ===
- Nelson Algren (died 1981) – Entrapment and Other Writings (collection)
- Margaret Atwood – The Year of the Flood (September 8)
- Nicholson Baker – The Anthologist (September)
- T. C. Boyle – The Women (February 10)
- Dan Brown – The Lost Symbol (September 15)
- Arno Camenisch – Sez ner
- Jan Cempírek – Bílej kůň, žlutej drak
- Chan Koonchung – The Fat Years
- Sam Childers – Another Man's War
- Kate Christensen – Trouble: A Novel
- E. L. Doctorow – Homer & Langley (September 1)
- Dave Eggers – The Wild Things (October 1)
- Adam Foulds – The Quickening Maze
- Rodrigo Fresán – El fondo del cielo
- Glen David Gold – Sunnyside (May 5)
- Philippa Gregory – The White Queen (August 18)
- Lauren Groff – Delicate Edible Birds (January 27)
- Haruki Murakami – 1Q84 (いちきゅうはちよん, Ichi-Kyū-Hachi-Yon, vol. 1–2 (May 29 – Japan)
- Yuri Herrera – Señales que precederán al fin del mundo (Signs Preceding the End of the World)
- Terrence E. Holt – In the Valley of the Kings (September 14)
- John Irving – Last Night in Twisted River (October 20 – Canada; October 27 – US)
- Rabee Jaber – أميركا (America)
- Denis Johnson – Nobody Move (June 5)
- Daniel Kehlmann – Fame (January 16)
- Barbara Kingsolver – The Lacuna: A Novel (November 3)
- Karl Ove Knausgård – Min Kamp (Norway)
- Herman Koch – The Dinner (Het diner – Netherlands)
- Joe R. Lansdale – Vanilla Ride (September 2009)
- Janice Y. K. Lee – The Piano Teacher
- Jonathan Lethem – Chronic City (October 13)
- Yiyun Li (李翊雲) – The Vagrants
- Attica Locke – Black Water Rising
- Hilary Mantel – Wolf Hall (April 30)
- Nadifa Mohamed – Black Mamba Boy (c. December)
- Lorrie Moore – A Gate at the Stairs (September 15)
- Alice Munro – Too Much Happiness (August 25)
- Vladimir Nabokov (died 1977) – The Original of Laura (unfinished last novel, November 3)
- Marie NDiaye – Three Strong Women (Trois Femmes puissantes, August 20)
- Joyce Carol Oates
  - Dear Husband, (March 31)
  - Little Bird of Heaven (September 15)
- Chuck Palahniuk – Pygmy (May 5)
- Lyudmila Petrushevskaya – There Once Lived a Woman Who Tried to Kill Her Neighbor's Baby (short stories translated from Russian, September 29)
- Thomas Pynchon – Inherent Vice (August 4)
- Philip Roth – The Humbling (November 2)
- Richard Russo – That Old Cape Magic (August 4)
- Stig Sæterbakken – Don't Leave Me
- Raphael Selbourne – Beauty (September)
- Steve Sem-Sandberg – De fattiga i Łódź
- Nicholas Sparks – The Last Song (September 8)
- Peter Stamm – Seven Years
- Kathryn Stockett – The Help (February 10)
- Mari Strachan – The Earth Hums in B Flat
- Olga Tokarczuk – Prowadź swój pług przez kości umarłych (Drive Your Plow Over the Bones of the Dead)
- Wells Tower – Everything Ravaged, Everything Burned (March 17)
- Sue Townsend – Adrian Mole: The Prostrate Years (November 5)
- Ferdinand von Schirach – "Verbrechen" (Burglary; short story)
- John Wray – Lowboy (March 3)
- Juli Zeh – Corpus Delicti (February 20)

=== Genre fiction ===
- Yukito Ayatsuji – Another (October 29)
- David Baldacci – First Family (April 21)
- Jim Butcher – Turn Coat (April 7)
- Eoin Colfer – And Another Thing... (October)
- Matthew J. Costello
  - Doom 3: Maelstrom (March 31)
  - Dark Calling (May 2009)
  - Hell's Heroes (October 2009)
- Michael Crichton – Pirate Latitudes (November 24)
- Andrew Hussie – Homestuck (April 13)
- J.C. Hutchins – 7th Son, Book One: Descent (October 27)
- Robert Jordan and Brandon Sanderson – The Gathering Storm (The Wheel of Time volume 12, October 27)
- Stephen King – Under the Dome (November 10)
- Richard Laymon – Dark Mountain (March 2009)
- Attica Locke – Black Water Rising
- Haruki Murakami – 1Q84 (いちきゅうはちよん, Ichi-Kyū-Hachi-Yon, Books 1–2, May 29)
- James Patterson
  - MAX: A Maximum Ride Novel (March 16)
  - Daniel X: Watch the Skies (July 27)
- Lawrence M. Schoen – Buffalito Destiny (June 1, first in the Tales of the Amazing Conroy series)

=== Children and young people ===
- Sagu Aoyama (蒼山 サグ) and Tinkle – Ro-Kyu-Bu! (February 10)
- Hajime Asano (あさの ハジメ) and Seiji Kikuchi (菊池 政治) – Mayo Chiki! (November 21)
- Brent Crawford – Carter Finally Gets It
- James Dashner – The Hunt for Dark Infinity (March 1)
- Joseph Delaney and Mark Walden – The Spook's Tale/Interception Point (March 5)
- John Fardell – The Secret of the Black Moon Moth
- Brian Floca – Moonshot: The Flight Of Apollo 11
- Betsy Franco – A Curious Collection of Cats
- Neil Gaiman – Blueberry Girl (March 10)
- Odo Hirsch – Darius Bell and the Glitter Pool
- Nonny Hogrogian – Cool Cat
- Mandy Hubbard – Prada and Prejudice
- John Hulme and Michael Wexler – The Lost Train of Thought (October)
- Erin Hunter
  - Great Bear Lake (February 10)
  - Sunrise (April 24)
  - Smoke Mountain (May 1)
  - Code of the Clans (June 9)
  - Bluestar's Prophecy (August)
  - The Fourth Apprentice (November 24)
- Gordon Korman - Zoobreak
- Reif Larsen – The Selected Works of T. S. Spivet
- Ursula K. Le Guin – Cat Dreams
- Peter Lerangis – The Sword Thief (April 1)
- D. J. Machale – The Soldiers of Halla (May 12)
- Joshua Mowll, et al. – Operation Storm City (May 12)
- Robert Muchamore
  - Henderson's Boys: The Escape (February 5)
  - Eagle Day (June 4)
- Brandon Mull – Secrets of the Dragon Sanctuary (March 24)
- Marilyn Nelson – Sweethearts of Rhythm: The Story Of The Greatest All-Girl Swing Band In The World
- Patrick Ness – The Ask and the Answer (May 4)
- Jenny Nimmo – Charlie Bone and the Red King
- Charles Ogden – Split Ends (January 27)
- Margie Palatini – Lousy Rotten Stinkin' Grapes
- Steven L. Peck – A Short Stay in Hell (novella, June 20)
- Catherine Rayner – Sylvia and Bird
- Rob Reger – Emily the Strange: The Lost Days (June 2)
- Rick Riordan – The Last Olympian (May 5)
- Amy Krouse Rosenthal – Duck! Rabbit!
- Carina Rozenfeld – Les Clefs de Babel
- Carrie Ryan – The Forest of Hands and Teeth (March 9)
- Angie Sage – Septimus Heap: The Magykal Papers (June 23)
- Michael Scott – The Sorceress (May 26)
- Dugald Steer etc. – Drake's Comprehensive Compendium of Dragonology
- Maggie Stiefvater – Shiver
- Jude Watson – Beyond the Grave (June 2)
- Victor Watson – Paradise Barn (first in eponymous series of four books)
- Tad Williams and Deborah Beale – The Dragons of Ordinary Farm (July 2)
- Jacqueline Wilson – Hetty Feather (first in eponymous series of five books)
- N. D. Wilson – Dandelion Fire
- Izuru Yumizuru and Okiura – Infinite Stratos (May 31)

=== Drama ===
- Jacob M. Appel – Causa mortis
- Jez Butterworth – Jerusalem
- Molly Davies – A Miracle
- Ella Hickson – Precious Little Talent
- Patrick Marber – After Miss Julie
- Lucy Prebble – ENRON
- Sarah Ruhl – In the Next Room (or The Vibrator Play)
- Anna Deavere Smith – Let Me Down Easy
- Zlatko Topčić – I Don't Like Mondays (Ne volim ponedjeljak)

=== Poetry ===
- Christopher Reid – A Scattering
- Toyo Shibata (柴田トヨ) – Kujikenaide (Don't lose heart)

=== Non-fiction ===
- Olivier Ameisen – The End of my Addiction (March 5)
- Daniel Ammann – The King of Oil (October 13)
- Joshua Blu Buhs – Bigfoot: The Life and Times of a Legend
- Michael Chabon – Manhood for Amateurs (October 6)
- Barbara Demick – Nothing to Envy: Ordinary Lives in North Korea (December 29)
- Wendy Doniger – The Hindus: An Alternative History
- Dave Eggers – Zeitoun (July 15)
- Christopher M. Fairman – Fuck: Word Taboo and Protecting Our First Amendment Liberties
- Craig Ferguson – American on Purpose (September 22)
- Brian Floca – Moonshot: The Flight Of Apollo 11
- Jonathan Safran Foer – Eating Animals (November 2)
- Jade Goody (died March 22) – Forever in My Heart: the Story of My Battle against Cancer
- David Grann – The Lost City of Z (February 24)
- Mitch Horowitz – Occult America (September 15)
- Michael Jones – The Retreat: Hitler's First Defeat
- Thomas Levenson – Newton and the Counterfeiter (June 3)
- Mark Levin – Liberty and Tyranny: A Conservative Manifesto (March 24)
- Norman Mailer (died 2007) – MoonFire ($112,500 coffee table edition)
- Patricia A. McAnany and Norman Yoffee - Questioning Collapse: Human Resilience, Ecological Vulnerability, and the Aftermath of Empire (November)
- Paul Midler – Poorly Made in China
- Joel Mokyr – The Enlightened Economy
- Brian A. Nelson – The Silence and the Scorpion
- Ram Oren – Gertruda's Oath
- Eric W. Sanderson – Mannahatta: A Natural History of New York City (May 1)
- Bill Simmons – The Book of Basketball (October 26)
- Peter Sloterdijk – You Must Change Your Life (Du mußt dein Leben ändern)
- Guy Sorman – Economics Does Not Lie (July 20)
- Michael H. Stone – The Anatomy of Evil (July 28)
- Bron Taylor – Dark Green Religion (November)
- Joel D. Vaughan - The Rise and Fall of the Christian Coalition (2009)
- William T. Vollmann – Imperial (July 29)
- Helen Waldstein Wilkes – Letters from the Lost

== Deaths ==
- January 1 – Johannes Mario Simmel, Austrian novelist and screenwriter (born 1924)
- January 7 – Valerie Flint, English medieval historian (born 1936)
- January 20 – Sheila Walsh, English novelist (born 1928)
- January 27 – John Updike, American novelist (born 1932)
- February 18 – Tayeb Salih, Sudanese fiction writer and cultural commentator (born 1929)
- February 20 – Christopher Nolan, Irish poet and author (choking; born 1965)
- February 25 – Philip José Farmer, American science fiction writer (born 1918)
- March 13 – James Purdy, American novelist, poet and playwright (born 1914)
- March 21 – Winifred Foley, English memoirist (born 1914)
- March 31 – Michael Cox, English novelist and biographer (hemangiopericytoma, born 1948)

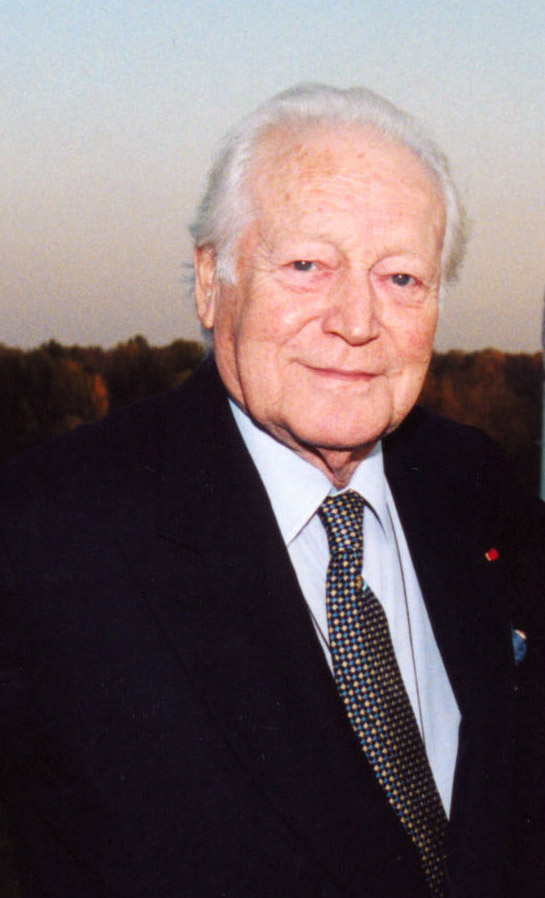
Maurice Druon

- April 14 – Maurice Druon, French historical novelist (born 1918)
- April 15 – Clement Freud, German-born English writer and broadcaster (born 1924)
- April 19 – J. G. Ballard, English novelist (born 1930)
- May 6 – Lev Losev, Russian American poet (born 1937)
- May 17 – Mario Benedetti, Uruguayan writer (born 1920)
- June 2 – David Eddings, American novelist (born 1931)
- June 25 – Michael Jackson, American pop singer, songwriter and author (born 1958)
- June 27 – Frank Barlow, English historian (born 1911)
- July 6 – Vasily Aksyonov, Russian novelist (born 1932)
- July 14 – Phyllis Gotlieb, Canadian novelist (born 1926)
- July 19 – Frank McCourt, American memoirist and Pulitzer Prize winner (born 1930)

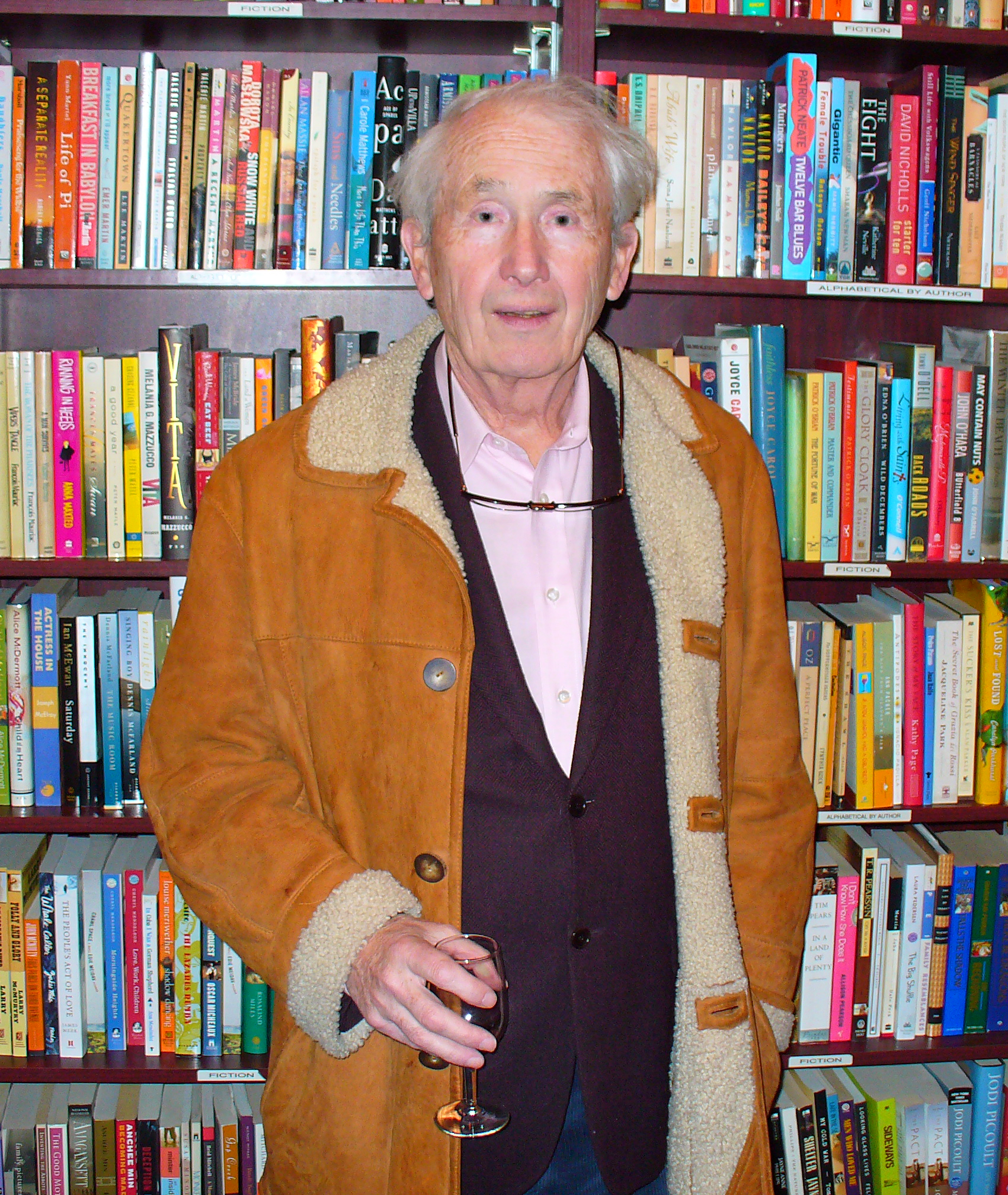
Frank McCourt

- July 23 – E. Lynn Harris, African American novelist (heart disease; born 1955)
- July 25 – Stanley Middleton, English novelist (cancer; born 1919)
- July 27
  - Aeronwy Thomas, English-born Welsh translator and writer (born 1943)

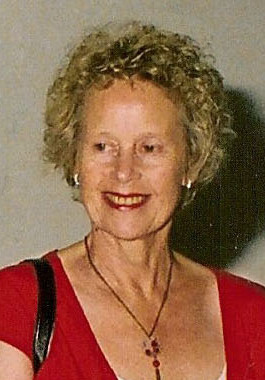
Aeronwy Thomas

  - Michaël Zeeman, Dutch critic, poet and writer (born 1958)
- July 31 – Tim Guest, English writer (drug overdose; born 1975)
- August 2 – Adolf Endler, German writer (born 1930)
- August 4 – Blake Snyder, American screenwriter and author (born 1957)
- August 5 – Budd Schulberg, American screenwriter and novelist (born 1914)
- August 6
  - Jack T. Kirby, American historian (born 1938)
  - Willibrordus S. Rendra, Indonesian poet (born 1935)
- August 7 – Danko Popović, Serbian writer (born 1928)
- August 8 – Alfonso Calderón, Chilean writer and poet (born 1930)
- August 9 – Thierry Jonquet, French writer (born 1954)
- August 10
  - Josef Burg, Ukrainian writing in Yiddish (born 1912)
  - Merlyn Mantle, American author (born 1932)
- August 16 – Alistair Campbell, New Zealand poet (born 1925)
- August 18
  - Dic Jones, Welsh poet writing in Welsh (born 1934)
  - Hugo Loetscher, Swiss author writing in German (born 1929)
  - Fernanda Pivano, Italian writer (born 1917)
- August 20 – Karla Kuskin, American children's author (born 1932)
- August 22 – Elmer Kelton, American Western novelist (born 1926)

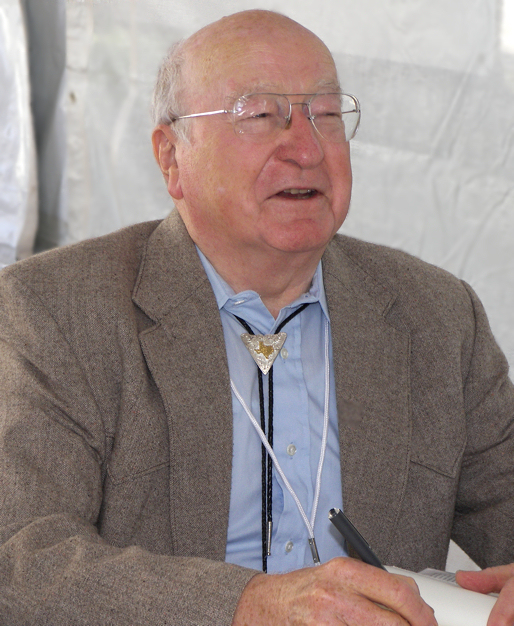
Elmer Kelton

- August 25
  - Bob Carroll, American historian and author (born 1936)
  - Sergey Mikhalkov, Russian writer and poet (born 1913)
- September 3 – Christine D'Haen, Belgian poet writing in Flemish (born 1923)

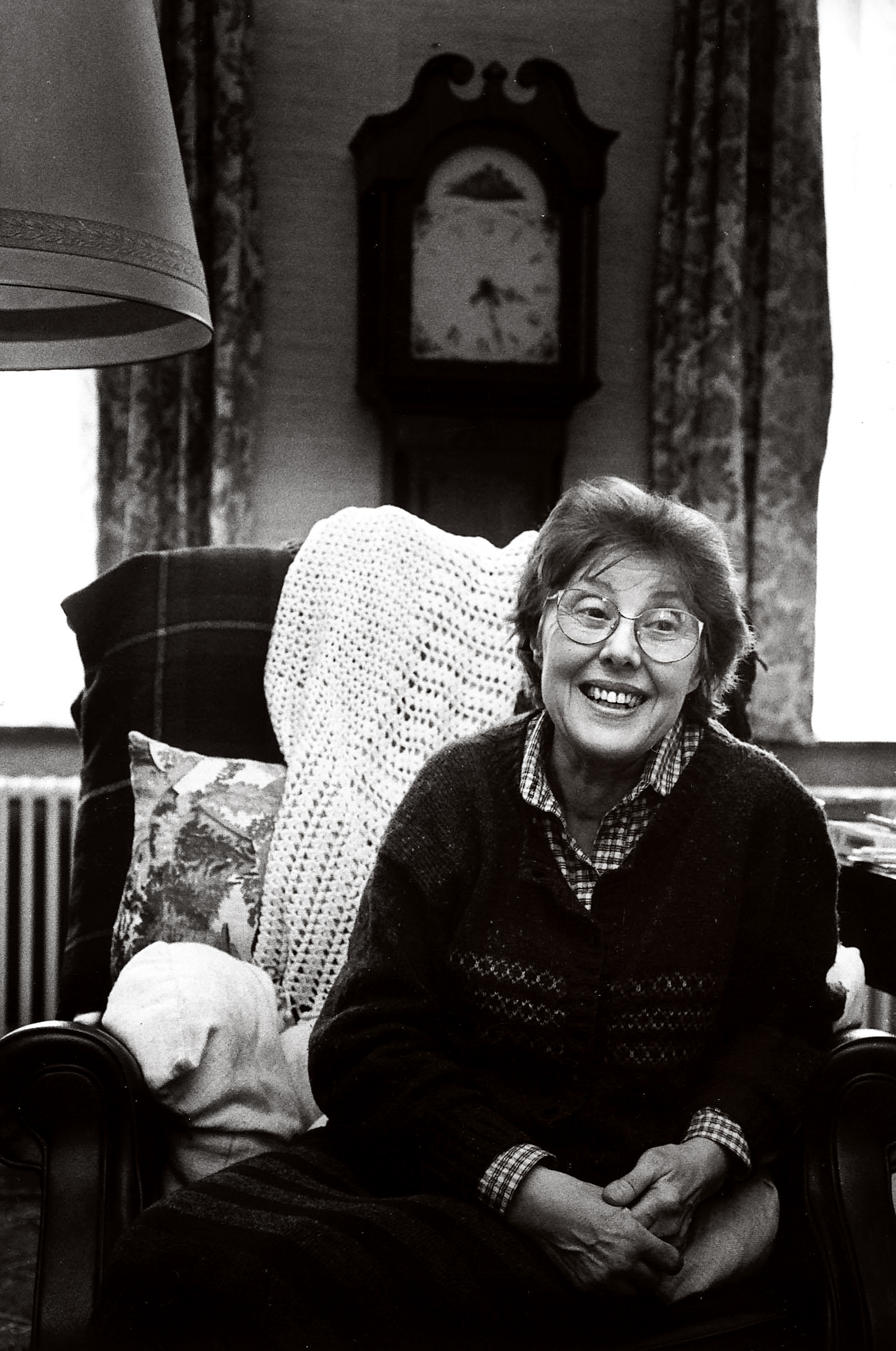
Christine D'Haen

- September 4 – Keith Waterhouse, English author and playwright (born 1929)
- September 6
  - Catherine Gaskin, Irish-born Australian romantic novelist (born 1929)
  - Nada Iveljić, Croatian children's writer (born 1931)
- September 10 – Lyn Hamilton, Canadian author (born 1944)
- September 11 – Jim Carroll, American writer and poet (born 1949)
- September 12
  - William Hoffman, American novelist (born 1925)
  - Antônio Olinto, Brazilian writer (born 1919)
- September 13 – Sarah E. Wright, American novelist (born 1928)
- September 15 – Trevor Rhone, Jamaican playwright (born 1940)
- September 19 – Milton Meltzer, American historian and author (born 1915)
- September 21 – Junzo Shono (庄野 潤三), Japanese author (born 1921)
- September 22 – Kole Čašule, Macedonian essayist, dramatist and short story writer (born 1921)
- September 24 – Nelly Arcan, Canadian novelist writing in French (suicide; born 1973)
- September 25 – Willy Breinholst, Danish author (born 1918)
- September 27 – William Safire, American columnist (born 1929)
- October 1
  - Otar Chiladze, Georgian writer (born 1933)
  - Cintio Vitier, Cuban poet (born 1921)
- October 4 – Veikko Huovinen, Finnish writer (born 1927)
- November 1 – Esther Hautzig, Polish-born American autobiographer (born 1930)
- November 20 – Naomi Frankel, German-born Israeli novelist (born 1918)
- November 29 – Robert Holdstock, English fantasy novelist (born 1949)

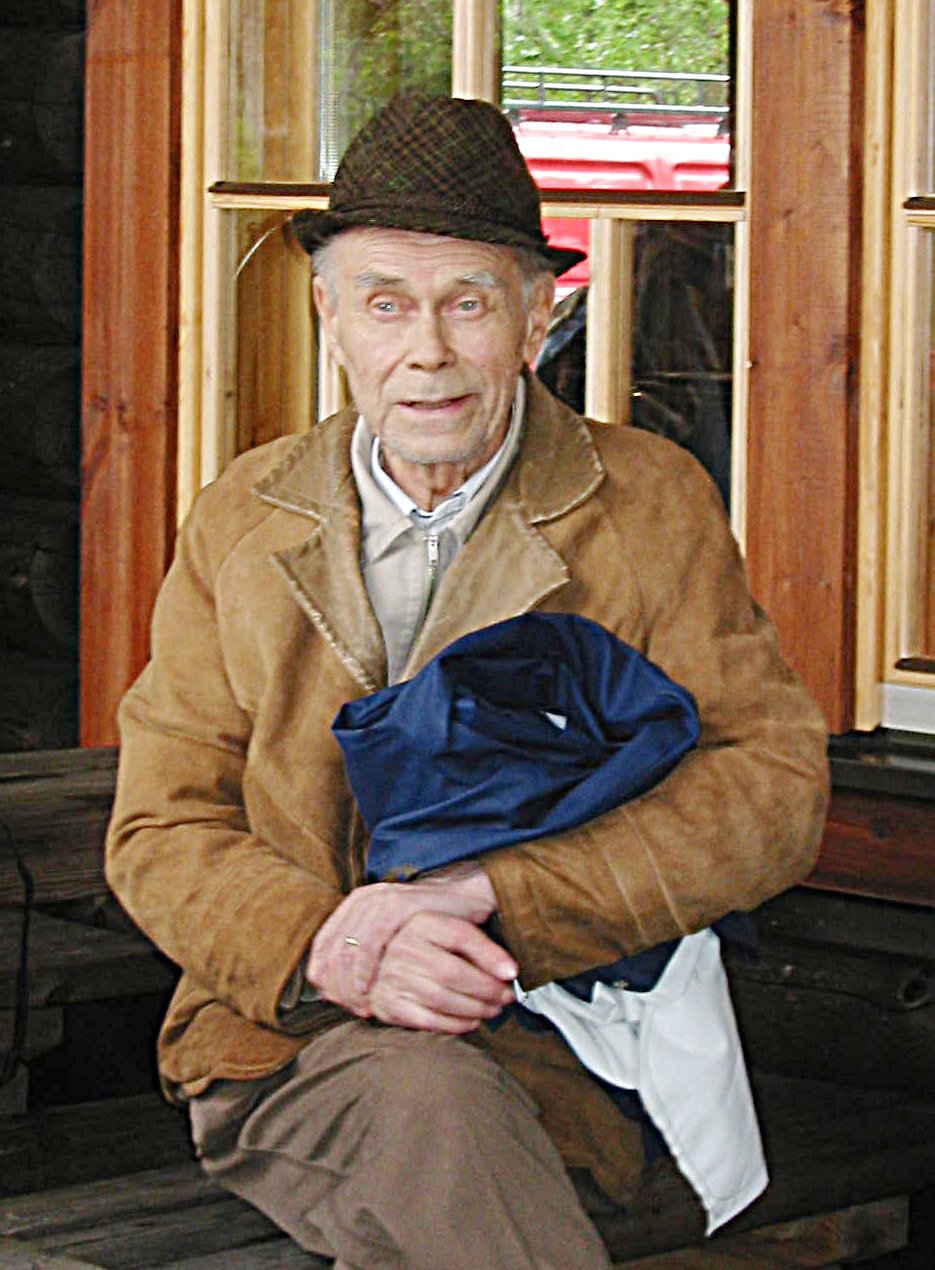
Veikko Huovinen

- November 30 – Milorad Pavić, Serbian writer (born 1929)
- December 2 –Elizabeth Berridge, British novelist (born 1919)
- December 5 – William Lederer, American author (born 1912)
- December 7
  - Carlene Hatcher Polite, American novelist (born 1932)
  - Pyotr Vail, Latvian-born Russian essayist and journalist (born 1949)
- December 13 – Julian Fane, British author (born 1927)
- December 15 – C. D. B. Bryan, American author (born 1936)
- December 19 – Loren Singer, American novelist (born 1923)
- December 20 – Vera Rich, English poet and journalist (born 1936)

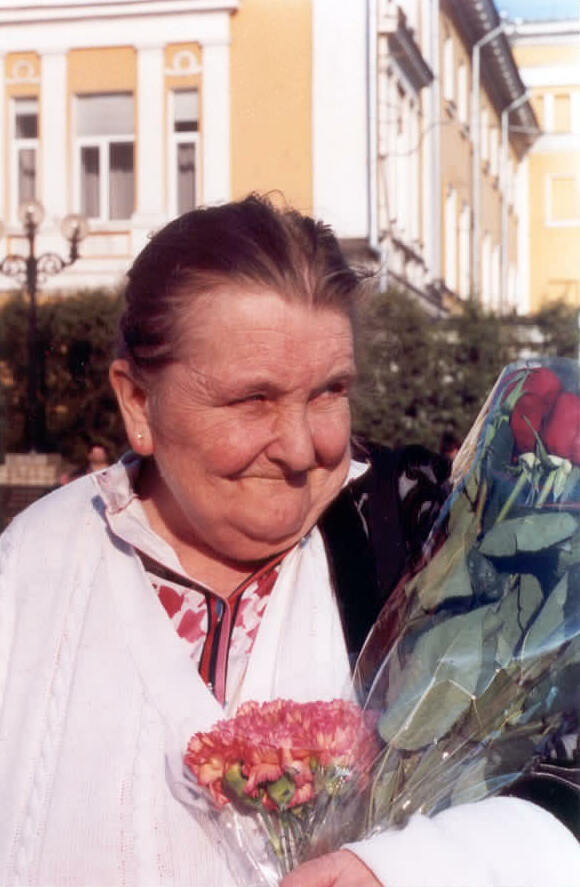
Vera Rich

- December 23 – Grigory Baklanov, Russian novelist (born 1923)
- December 25
  - Vrindavanam Venugopalan, Indian journalist (born 1935)
  - (or 24th) Rachel Wetzsteon, American poet (suicide; born 1967)
- December 26
  - Dennis Brutus, South African poet (born 1924)
  - Norval White, American author (born 1926)
- December 30 – Jacqueline Sturm, New Zealand poet and writer (born 1927)

== Awards ==
- Nobel Prize in Literature: Herta Müller

=== Australia ===
- Miles Franklin Award: Tim Winton, Breath

=== Canada ===
- Canada Reads: Lawrence Hill, The Book of Negroes
- Dayne Ogilvie Prize: Main award, Debra Anderson; honour of distinction, Greg Kearney.
- Edna Staebler Award for Creative Non-Fiction: Russell Wangersky, Burning Down the House
- Governor General's Awards: Multiple categories; see 2009 Governor General's Awards.
- Hilary Weston Writers' Trust Prize for Nonfiction: Brian Brett, Trauma Farm: A Rebel History of Rural Life
- Rogers Writers' Trust Fiction Prize: Annabel Lyon, The Golden Mean
- Scotiabank Giller Prize: Linden MacIntyre, The Bishop's Man
- Writers' Trust Engel/Findley Award: David Bergen

=== France ===
- Grand Prix du roman de l'Académie française: Pierre Michon, Les Onze

=== Sweden ===
- Astrid Lindgren Memorial Award: Tamer Institute for Community Education

=== United Kingdom ===
- Bookseller/Diagram Prize for Oddest Title of the Year: Crocheting Adventures with Hyperbolic Planes, Daina Taimina
- Caine Prize for African Writing: E. C. Osondu, "Waiting"
- Carnegie Medal for children's literature: Siobhan Dowd, Bog Child
- Man Booker Prize: Hilary Mantel, Wolf Hall
- Orange Prize for Fiction: to Home by Marilynne Robinson

=== United States ===
- Lambda Literary Awards: Multiple categories; see 2009 Lambda Literary Awards.
- National Book Award for Fiction: Colum McCann, Let the Great World Spin
- National Book Critics Circle Award: Hilary Mantel, Wolf Hall
- National Book Critics Circle Award for General Nonfiction: Richard Holmes, The Age of Wonder: How the Romantic Generation Discovered the Beauty and Terror of Science
- Newbery Medal for children's literature: Neil Gaiman, The Graveyard Book
- PEN/Faulkner Award for Fiction: Joseph O'Neill, Netherland
- Pulitzer Prize for Fiction: Elizabeth Strout, Olive Kitteridge
- Whiting Awards: Fiction: Adam Johnson, Nami Mun, Salvatore Scibona, Vu Tran; Nonfiction: Michael Meyer, Hugh Raffles; Plays: Rajiv Joseph; Poetry: Jericho Brown, Jay Hopler, Joan Kane

=== Elsewhere ===
- Camões Prize: Arménio Vieira
- David Cohen Prize: Seamus Heaney
- European Book Prize: Mariusz Szczygieł, Gottland and Sylvie Goulard, L'Europe pour les Nuls
- Friedenspreis des Deutschen Buchhandels: Claudio Magris
- International Dublin Literary Award: Michael Thomas, Man Gone Down
- International Prize for Arabic Fiction: Youssef Ziedan, Azazel
- SAARC Literary Award: Jayanta Mahapatra, Uday Prakash, Kamaal Khan

== See also ==
- 2009 in Australian literature
- 2009 in comics
- List of literary awards
- List of poetry awards

== Notes ==
- Hahn, Daniel (2015). The Oxford Companion to Children's Literature (Second ed.). New York, NY: Oxford University Press. ISBN 9780198715542.
