= Drak =

Drak may refer to:

- Drak (mythology), a legendary creature from German folklore
- Dorje Drak, one of the Six "Mother" Nyingma Monasteries in Tibet
- Karak Drak, race of short, stout humanoids similar to the dwarves of Middle-earth
- Lyssa Drak, alien supervillainess published by DC Comics
- Zhang Yudrakpa Tsöndru Drak (1122–1193), founder of the Tshalpa Kagyu sect of Tibetan Buddhism
- Drak Pack, animated television series
- Drak Yerpa, monastery and ancient meditation caves east of Lhasa, Tibet

== See also ==
- Bílej kůň, žlutej drak, Czech novel, written by Jan Cempírek
- Za humny je drak, 1982 Czechoslovak film
- Darak
- Darakh
- Drac, fictional language of the Dracs, alien species in Barry B. Longyear's The Enemy Papers trilogy
- Draka (disambiguation)
- Drake (disambiguation)
- Drakh, alien race in the Babylon 5 universe
- Durack (disambiguation)
- Durak
