= Through the Night =

Through the Night may refer to:

- BBC's title for the radio programme Euroclassic Notturno
- Through the Night (novel), a 2011 novel by Stig Sæterbakken
- Through the Night (album), a 2012 album by Ren Harvieu
- "Through the Night" (Drumsound & Bassline Smith song), a 2013 song by Drumsound & Bassline Smith
- "Through the Night" (IU song), a 2017 song by IU
- Through the Night (2020 film), an American documentary film
- Through the Night (2023 film), a Canadian-French-Belgian film
