= Daniel Genis =

Russian-American journalist and writer (born 1978)

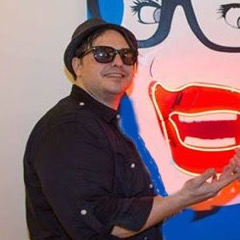
- Daniel Genis in Manhattan, 2015
- Born: August 2, 1978 (age 48); New York City
- Citizenship: American
- Occupations: Journalist, Writer, Media Personality
- Spouse: Petra Szabo (m. 2003)
- Relatives: Alexander Genis (father)
- Writing career
- Period: 2003 – present
- Genre: Non-fiction
- Subject: Marginality
- Website: danielgenis.net

Daniel Genis (born August 2, 1978) is a Russian-American journalist, writer, and media personality.

== Early life and career ==
Daniel Genis was born in New York City to Alexander and Irina Genis, only a few months after their emigration from the Soviet Union, in 1977. He grew up in Washington Heights, Manhattan, NY.

His father, Alexander Genis is a Jewish Russian writer, broadcaster, and cultural critic. During the 1980s and 1990s, Genis's parents' apartment doubled as a clubhouse for Russian writers and artists. Genis was exposed to literature and the arts from a young age, mixing with artists and intellectuals, including Russian ballet dancer Mikhail Baryshnikov, Umberto Eco, Norman Mailer, Joseph Brodsky, and Czech film director Miloš Forman.

Daniel's father and his collaborators edited Семь дней (Seven Days) (a weekly literary supplement to Новое Русское Слово) in the living room of his childhood home for a short time. They later became the chief literary critics of the weekly newspaper Новый Американец. Alexander Genis, Pyotr Vail, Sergei Dovlatov and Vagrich Bakhchanyan collaborated on a weekly emigre magazine which became an early publisher of Eduard Limonov, Vladimir Sorokin, Victor Pelevin and Andrei Sinyavsky.

Genis graduated from Stuyvesant High School in 1996. He continued his education at New York University, graduating with a bachelor's degree in History and French in 1999. Genis also spent one year studying at the University of Copenhagen in 1999. Genis developed an interest during this time in antiquarian bookshops and specifically, eighteenth and nineteenth century editions of Greek and Roman classic literature.

While in college, Genis initially worked as an intern and then as an editorial assistant at the publishing house Applause Books, from 1997 to 1998. His tasks entailed setting manuscripts into digital versions and, after two years, Genis ended with an editing credit on The Encyclopedia of Fantastic Film. Moreover, Genis worked in the production team for the publication of American theatre and film book editor John A. Willis's Theatre World in 1997.

After graduating from NYU, Genis worked for Nancy Love as an agent-associate. This literary agency was on the Upper East Side; Genis's role entailed finding new authors to represent, although his literary interests did not match his employer's taste for self-help books. Genis and Nancy Love parted ways in 2001.

== Arrest and incarceration ==
In 2001, Genis traded in his publishing career for a life of crime to feed a raging heroin appetite. His taste for the illegal substance (costing Genis $100 per day) led him to embark on a string of robberies in order to pay his debts. The month-long robbery spree centered around the Lower East Side, Greenwich Village, Chelsea, Gramercy Park, and the Financial District. Nicknamed the "apologetic bandit" by the press, Genis offered apologies to his victims as he took their cash and returned their wallets. His 18 robberies accounted for $700 in total.

During one week in 2003, Genis committed five robberies. In November of the same year, he was identified by one of his victims, arrested, and eventually convicted of five counts of armed robbery, for which he served 10 years in prison.

While serving his sentence, Genis spent four years in close proximity to American mass murderer Ronald DeFeo. Genis had not only shared with DeFeo the horror of substance addiction, but both hailed from Amityville as well. Since his release, Genis wrote an article for Vice Magazine, commenting on their interactions "inside". Genis currently has a bi-weekly column at Vice, titled "In the Margins".

Genis has also collaborated with fellow drug addict and convict Michael Alig. In a 2014 interview with Genis, after being released on parole, Alig said that his time spent reading while in solitary inspired him to write his memoirs, which he titled Aligula, and he particularly identified with the character Raskolnikov from Dostoevsky's Crime and Punishment.

Genis's prison sentence granted him time to plan his literary career. In fact, Genis remarks that his authentic education as a reader and writer began not while he was a history major or working at a literary agency in Manhattan, but at the Green Haven Correctional Facility in Stormville, New York; where Genis read 1,046 books. Genis kept a diary of his readings, numbering and annotating each entry. While exploring books that helped make sense of his situation, he spent most of his attention on serious fiction and, in particular, long-difficult novels. Genis read for practical knowledge and for the sake of his own sanity, reading an assortment of books ranging from incarceration memoirs by Malcolm X to classic literature written by James Joyce, Marcel Proust, and Fyodor Dostoevsky and at his father's request, Ulysses. Additionally, Genis read In Search of Lost Time alongside two academic guidebooks full of French notations and a dictionary, stating that no other novel gave him as much appreciation for his time in prison.

Genis continued work on his 300-page novel after spending $275 on a Swintec typewriter (with clear plastic cases allowing easy inspection for drugs, weapons, or other contraband. These typewriters are commonly found in prison). Genis's dystopian novel, titled Narcotica, is based on the acceptance of narcotics in Western culture. It offers an alternate version of a society that had illicit drugs which become the legally or socially accepted inebriant of choice.

Additionally, Genis wrote thousands of letters and journal entries. The tri-lingual Genis was often given the task of translating from Russian to English, in exchange for commissary money. For instance, Genis was tasked to translate his father's work for the American publication Read Russia.

Alongside his literary progression, Genis became an avid weightlifter. Since being released from prison, he has criticized the efforts of some US states to remove weights from prisons. He recently wrote about prison weightlifting and its benefits for Deadspin magazine. Additionally, Genis developed a taste for cooking and has since written on the topic of cooking in prison for the Daily Beast and the publication KCRW, discussing the variable cooking opportunities depending on the security levels of one's prison.

In several articles since his release, Genis has explored the theme of the religion in prison. He attributes the high numbers of religious inmates to a lack of education. Furthermore, he has reported extensively on the discriminatory nature of life in jail for Jewish inmates. Additionally, Genis has unpacked the realities of sexuality and masculinity for inmates with HuffPost Live's academic, journalist and author Marc Lamont Hill, American author and academic Mark Anthony Neal, and former inmate turned public speaker, author, and activist Shaun Attwood.

== Post-prison works ==
After his release from prison, Genis was selected for representation by the Mary Evans literary agency. He sold his forthcoming memoirs, titled Sentence, to Penguin Books in the summer of 2014. The publication discusses the 1,046 books he read during his incarceration.

His writings have appeared in Gothamist, Süddeutsche Zeitung, The Daily Beast, Moscow Times, Vice, Paris Review, The Washington Post, New York Daily News, Thrillist, Deadspin, The Fix, Testosterone Nation, Chicago Tribune, Minneapolis Star, and The Guardian online. Genis wrote an article for Vice entitled, "New York State's Scariest Prison", concerning the escapees at Clinton Correctional Facility in June 2015. Genis also appeared on NBC Universal's Deadline in June 2015 to discuss Clinton's escape, CNN's Newday (regarding Joyce Mitchell) and was quoted by The Buffalo News in its article "Escaping prison, surviving the wild: the journey of Matt and Sweat". His appearance on Burl Barer's Outlaw Radio show necessitated a second interview. Genis became a contributor to the museum/art work that is Joe Coleman's Odditorium by offering a seven-inch pony tail he grew over seven years of incarceration. It was inducted in a ceremony and placed on a shelf with Wild Bill Carlisle's Stetson hat.

Genis published his fifth article in Newsweek in 2015, continuing to explore his interest in Chinese art. He profiled the gallery owner who is integral to the evolution in this art movement's reputation in "Eli Klein on Riding the Wave China's Contemporary Art Scene" for Klein Sun Gallery in Chelsea, New York. Previously, Genis has written extensively on the celebrated Chinese artist Zhang Dali. Genis's publication, entitled "A Gentleman's Guide to Sex in Prison", was listed in the "30 Great Articles and Essays about Sex" and has been viewed over 850,000 times. Genis reviewed the art opening Michael Alig had in three galleries in one night. Manager Kirsten Bowen and the Woolly Mammoth Theatre reference Genis's article in their show, Lights Rise on Grace. which explores themes of incarceration.

Genis has written for numerous German, Russian, and Austrian newspapers, including The Moscow Times and Süddeutsche Zeitung. Translations of his work exist in French, Italian, Spanish and Hebrew. Genis has featured on multiple radio talk shows, such as National Public Radio, discussing subjects concerning weightlifting and masculinity in prison. Further talk show appearances include speaking with KCRW on topics concerning "Cooking in Prison", "Celebrating Thanksgiving: Stomach, Strategy, Leftovers and Lore", as well as for the Texas radio program Walter and Johnson, WBAL's Morning News, Talkline with Zev Brenner on the discussion of "Jews in Jail", and Friendly Atheist Podcasts talk show.

In addition to his writing and appearances, Genis has delivered several lectures on his writing career. As a guest lecturer for Scott Anderson, Assistant Professor of Philosophy at the University of British Columbia, he addressed a class of Philosophy graduate students who had been assigned Genis's work to read for an ethics course. Genis answered questions for two hours after speaking about life ethics.

Genis's talk, titled "Why Terrorists Weep: The Socio-Cultural Practices of Jihadi Militant", brings attention to his writings on culture inside American prisons.

In the summer of 2015, Genis had two magazine debuts. His viral article on cooking in prison, published by the Thrillist Media Group, was selected for inclusion in The Week. The article was also paraphrased in Esquire His feature on the unlikely winners of war with abstract opponents put Genis on the cover of Fräulein Intersections Magazin Numéro Homme in Berlin.

Genis was voted Employee of the Month by Vice Magazine in September 2014. He also received Rookie of the Year award by Deadspin and was nominated for Deadspin's Hall of Fame in 2014.

== Personal life ==
In June 2003, five months before his arrest, Genis married Petra Szabo, a photographer and instructor of Vinyāsa and Forrest yoga. Since Genis's release from prison, he and Szabo have lived in Brooklyn, New York.
