= Invisible Hands =

Invisible Hands may refer to:

- "Invisible Hands" (song), a 1983 song by Kim Carnes
- Invisible Hands (novel), by Norwegian author Stig Sæterbakken
- Invisible Hands (EP), a 1997 EP by The Handsome Family
- Invisible Hands Music, an independent record label founded by musician Charles Kennedy

== See also ==
- Invisible hand (disambiguation)
