= Henry W. Pickford =

American philosopher

Academic background
- Education: Yale University (PhD)

Henry W. Pickford is an American philosopher and Professor of German Studies at Duke University. He is known for his works on contemporary philosophy.

== Books ==
- The Sense of Semblance: Philosophical Analyses of Holocaust Art, Fordham University Press 2013
- Thinking with Tolstoy and Wittgenstein: Emotion, Expression and Art, Northwestern University Press 2015
- In Defense of Intuitions: A New Rationalist Manifesto, Palgrave Macmillan 2013
- Der aufrechte Gang im windschiefen Kapitalismus: Modelle kritischen Denkens (ed.), Springer Verlag 2018
- Theodor W. Adorno, Critical Models: Interventions and Catchwords, trans. Henry W. Pickford, New York: Columbia University Press 1998
- Lev Loseff, Selected Early Poems, trans. Henry W. Pickford, Spuytenduyvil Press 2013
- Adorno: A Critical Life, forthcoming
- The Oxford Handbook to Adorno (ed.), forthcoming
