= Lillehammer UNESCO City of Literature =

Member of the UNESCO Creative Cities Network

Lillehammer UNESCO City of Literature is a joint effort by Lillehammer, the Provincial Government of Innlandet, Norwegian Festival of Literature, Nansen Academy, Maihaugen and Inland Norway University of Applied Sciences. Through different programs and initiatives, these six partners work together to strengthen Lillehammer's position as a creative city, and promoting Norwegian literature abroad.

Lillehammer was designated as a UNESCO City of Literature in 2017, and thus became a permanent member of the UNESCO Creative Cities Network.

The offices of Lillehammer UNESCO City of Literature is located within Lillehammer's House of Literature.

As of 2021, Lillehammer is the only City of Literature in Scandinavia.
