= Invisible hand (disambiguation) =

Invisible hand is a term used by Adam Smith to describe the basis of the self-regulating nature of the marketplace.

Invisible hand may also refer to:

- Invisible Hand (TV series), a 1960s and 1970s Polish Television series
- Invisible Hand (Star Wars), the flagship of General Grievous in Star Wars: Episode III – Revenge of the Sith
- The Invisible Hand (play), a 2012 play by Ayad Akhtar
- The Invisible Hand (serial), a 1920 American silent film serial
- "The Invisible Hand" (The Spectacular Spider-Man), a television episode

== See also ==
- Invisible Hands (disambiguation)
- The Other Invisible Hand, a 2007 economics book by Julian Le Grand
