= Operation Typhoon Shore =

2006 young adult novel by Joshua Mowll

- Author: Joshua Mowll
- Language: English
- Series: The Guild of Specialists
- Genre: Young adult novel
- Published: 2006 (Walker Books)
- Publication place: United Kingdom
- Media type: Print (Hardcover)
- Preceded by: Operation Red Jericho
- Followed by: Operation Storm City

Operation Typhoon Shore is the second novel in The Guild of Specialists trilogy following Operation Red Jericho by Joshua Mowll. It was published in the UK by Walker Books and in the US by Candlewick Press in 2006.

== Plot summary ==
It continues the journey of Becca and Doug MacKenzie. In this second adventure, Becca and her brother, Doug, have escaped Wenzi Island and Sheng-Fat, but find themselves right back in the action.

Their ship is struck by a powerful typhoon and is driven ashore on Sulphur Island. There the two teens, Doug and Becca; their uncle, Captain MacKenzie; his brave crew and the Sujing Quantou warriors find themselves once again facing their nemesis, Julius Pembleton-Crozier, his hired army of Kalaxx warriors, and several other people such as his wife Lucrieta, Alfonso Borelli, a Treasurer of the HGS who has betrayed the HGS and joined Julius Pembleton-Crozier in the resurrected Coterie Of St. Petersburg. Alfonso Borelli also gives Julius the Eastern gyrolabe, which he took from the HGS after he betrayed it.

It takes all of their ingenuity, bravery, and wit to figure out his intent and why the islands are so very important to these enemies of the Honourable Guild of Specialists (HGS). The captain's Northern gyrolabe is stolen by the Kalaxx and Becca and Doug discover clues that lead to the finding of the Southern chapter of The 99 Elements and the Southern gyrolabe. Xu and Xi manage to save the southern part of The 99 Elements but the southern gyrolabe is taken by Julius Pembleton-Crozier. Also the Expedient, the captain's ship, is broken beyond repair and has to be scuttled. They also say goodbye to Liberty Da Vine who, failing to regain her plane Lola, is given the plane that was aboard the Expedient, called the Fighting Dragon, and flies off to find her father. The captain plans to send Doug and Becca back to school, but they decide to take a ship to the harsh desert of Sinkiang to search for their parents.

This book rolls along with plenty of action and fun and includes sketches, photographs, newspaper clippings, and foldout information on technology.

== Characters ==
- Rebecca MacKenzie (Becca)
- Douglas MacKenzie (Doug)
- Liberty da Vine
- Captain MacKenzie
