= Sauermugg =

1999 novel by Stig Sæterbakken

- Author: Stig Sæterbakken
- Language: Norwedian
- Publisher: Cappelen
- Publication date: 1999
- Publication place: Norway
- Pages: 174
- ISBN: 9788202184094

Sauermugg is a novel by Norwegian author Stig Sæterbakken. It was published in 1999 as the final part of his "S trilogy", following Siamesisk (1997) and Selvbeherskelse (1998). The book introduces Sæterbakken's alter-ego Sauermugg. The novel has since been released in different revised and expanded versions, such as the Swedish Sauermugg Redux-edition in 2007, with c. 50 pages of additional material.
