= Chan Koonchung =

Chinese science-fiction writer

- 陈冠中
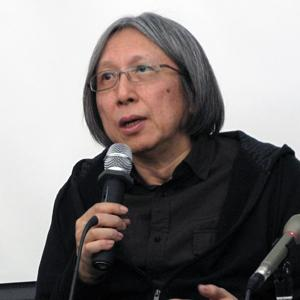
- Born: 1952 (age 73–74); Shanghai, China
- Occupations: Author, activist, environmentalist, journalist
- Writing career
- Genre: Science fiction
- Notable work: The Fat Years (2009)

Chan Koonchung
- Traditional Chinese: 陳冠中
- Simplified Chinese: 陈冠中
Transcriptions
Standard Mandarin
- Hanyu Pinyin: Chén Guānzhōng
Yue: Cantonese
- Jyutping: can4 gun3 zung1

Chan Koonchung (born 1952) is a Chinese science-fiction writer who has previously lived in Hong Kong, Taiwan, and the United States. He currently lives in Beijing. Chan also holds Canadian citizenship. He is the founder of Green Power (綠色力量), Green Garden Organic Farm (綠田園有機農場) and the Hong Kong Film Directors Association (香港電影導演會) among other organizations, and is currently on the international board of directors of Greenpeace. Previously, he worked as a reporter for the Hong Kong tabloid, The Star. In 1976 he co-founded City Magazine (號外) with Qiu Shiwen and Deng Xiaoyu and Hu Junyi. In the 1990s he worked as an overseas publisher for the mainland literary journal Dushu (读书), published by the China Publishing Group (中国出版集团) and SDX Joint Publishing Company (生活读书新知三联书店). In 1991 he played the role of Professor Liu Yuebai in Yan Hao and Tsui Hark's adaptation of Ah Cheng's 1984 novel, The Chess Master.

== Biography ==
Chan was born in 1952 in Shanghai, China. Chan earned his BA from the University of Hong Kong and completed graduate study at Boston University.

== Works ==
His dystopian novel The Fat Years (2009) was published in English by Doubleday in 2011.

In his book, The Unbearable Dreamworld of Champa the Driver (2014), the Tibetan driver and lover of a Chinese businesswoman falls in love with her daughter. It is a satirical metaphor of the unbalanced relations between China and Tibet.

Chan's novella Zero-Point Beijing (2020) imagines a surrealistic narrative in which Mao Zedong becomes obsessed with physical immortality and becomes an adherent of Russian cosmism. This leads him to mastermind an attempt at future rebirth through cryopreservation. Those tasked with secretly preserving and resurrecting his body in the future ultimately make a desperate deal with a Chinese American entrepreneur in an effort to achieve their mission. PRC intelligence agents learn of the effort. Fearing that a successful rebirth would lead to Neo-Maoists revolting against the government, they crackdown on the cryonics lab and destroy Mao's preserved brain.

== Awards and honors ==
- 2013 Jan Michalski Prize for Literature, finalist, The Fat Years
