= Pyotr Vail =

- Born: 29 September 1949; Riga
- Died: 7 December 2009 (aged 60); Prague
- Education: Moscow Polygraphic Institute
- Occupations: writer, editor, radio executive
- Writing career
- Language: Russian
- Literary movement: deputy director of Radio Liberty's Russia service
- Pyotr Vail's voice From the Echo of Moscow program, 7 December 2006

Pyotr Lvovich Vail (Russian: Пётр Львович Вайль; born 29 September 1949, Riga, Latvian SSR – 7 December 2009, Prague, Czech Republic) was a Russian author, journalist, essayist and deputy director of Radio Liberty's Russia service.

== Life ==
Born in Riga 1949, he studied at the Moscow Polygraphic Institute. He moved to the United States in 1977, joining the station in the mid-1980s. He moved to the Prague headquarters in 1995. In 1995, he reported from Chechnya.

Vail's best-known books include Genii mesta (The Genius of Place) and Stikhi pro menya (Poems About Me). He produced several books with Alexander Genis, including Russkaya kukhnya v izgnanii (Russian Cuisine in Exile) and 60-e. Mir sovetskogo cheloveka (The '60s. The World of Soviet People). He co-edited Iosif Brodsky: trudy i dni (Joseph Brodsky: Works and Days), about Nobel Prize-winning poet Joseph Brodsky, with Lev Losev. He died in a Prague hospital.
