= Sylvia and Bird =

2009 picture book by Catherine Rayner

- Author: Catherine Rayner
- Language: English
- Subject: Children's literature, Picture book
- Published: 2009 (Little Tiger Press)
- Publication place: England
- Media type: Print (hardback, paperback)
- Pages: 24 (unpaginated)
- ISBN: 9781845068561
- OCLC: 271774172

Sylvia and Bird is a 2009 picture book by Catherine Rayner. It is about the friendship between a dragon, called Sylvia, and a little yellow bird.

== Reception ==
Booktrust described Sylvia and Bird as "a story that gently explores themes of expectation, loneliness, friendship and valuing others". and The Daily Telegraph called it a "strange and simple story".

Kirkus Reviews, in its review, wrote "Though pleasant enough, no new ground is broken on the subject, and the plot turns are far from organic." and concluded "In all, though, it may impress the adult eye more than a child's."

Sylvia and Bird has also been reviewed by Booklist, Literary Review, the Irish Examiner, and The Scotsman.

== See also ==
- Solomon Crocodile, another picture book by Rayner
