= Operation Red Jericho =

Young adult adventure novel by Joshua Mowll

- Author: Joshua Mowll
- Language: English
- Series: The Guild of Specialists
- Genre: Young adult novel
- Publisher: Walker Books
- Publication date: 9 August 2005
- Publication place: United Kingdom
- Media type: Print (Hardcover)
- Pages: 266
- ISBN: 1-84428-625-8
- OCLC: 60838315
- Followed by: Operation Typhoon Shore

Operation Red Jericho (September 5, 2005) is the first novel in The Guild of Specialists trilogy by Joshua Mowll.

== Plot summary ==
In 1920, the heroes of the story Rebecca and Doug McKenzie, leave Shanghai aboard their uncle's ship, the Expedient, intent on discovering the whereabouts of their missing parents, who have disappeared while on a secret mission to the deserts of Western China. Faced with terrifying bloodthirsty pirates, submarines, and deadly torpedoes, their task quickly becomes a dangerous struggle to survive. Rebecca and Doug discover that the answers they seek lie in a tangle of mysterious age-old societies guarding ancient secrets, and particularly a strange and dangerous substance, known as Daughter Of The Sun, which lies at the heart of the mystery.

== Reception ==
Upon publication, Operation Red Jericho won the Poppy Red Award for Innovation in Children's Books at the 2006 British Book Trade Awards.

The book was well received, with Operation Red Jericho being the Sunday Times Children's Book of the Week during September 2005.

The Sunday Times said the novel "is not just an adventure story; it is a designer object". A reviewer for the South China Morning Post expanded on this sentiment, writing, “Mowll's genius [...] is in his clever mixing of old and new storytelling devices, and a clear and intelligent voice that should appeal to both girls and boys”.

Publishers Weekly referred to the novel as "intriguing" and highlighted the novel's various inclusions, such as "Becca's diary entries and sidebars" and "drawings from Doug's sketchbook", which provide useful background information". Kirkus Reviews also highlighted such inclusions, stating that the "excerpts from Rebecca’s diary, four beautifully produced gatefolds detailing ships, weapons, and submersible crafts, wonderful pencil sketches, photographs (and more) add dimension and authenticity to the high-seas hijinks." Booklist's Francisca Goldsmith added that the "highly detailed" and "suitably authentic" reproductions "will have great appeal for readers who thrive on schematics and puzzles."

Despite indicating that "readers will revel in the exciting setting, the abundant science and history," and numerous action sequences, Kirkus Reviews critiqued the development of the novel's primary plot, indicating that "the urgency of the siblings’ search for their parents, the emotional core of the story, drowns in the wake of swashbuckling action".

Goldsmith described the main characters, Becca and Doug, as "bold, inquisitive, and creative". They further commented on Mowll's writing style, mentioning the characters' "distinctive traits", such as Doug's overuse of the word lethal.

== Sequels ==
Operation Red Jericho was written as the first of a trilogy of books. A sequel, Operation Typhoon Shore was published in 2006, and the third book of the trilogy, Operation Storm City, was published in 2008.
