= Les clefs de babel =

2009 novel by Carina Rozenfeld

- Author: Carina Rozenfeld
- Language: French
- Genre: Fantasy children's novel
- Publisher: Syros
- Publication date: 2009
- Publication place: France
- Media type: Print (Paperback)

Les clefs de babel (literally The keys of Babel) is a French language children's novel written by Carina Rozenfeld. The book was published in 2009 by Syros and features in a children's book collection organised by Denis Guiot called Soon.

== Plot summary ==
The book takes place inside the tower of Babel in to which humanity took refuge 1,000 years ago, as so to take protection from a cloud that poisoned the earth. The group of humans entered the tower in five separate groups, each also separated their area of the tower off as so to prevent possible diseased persons entering. The plot begins in the highest most portion of the tower when the main character's father gives him a cat who he says can speak; the opposition leader who is also the main character's father is assassinated whilst attending an Opera.

The boy (Liram) then flees and is told by an acquaintance of his father that he must delve into the lower reaches of the tower; taking his cat with him, Liram descends alone. On the next floor, he awakes in a hospital and they recognise him as not being a member of their society; their belief of staying clean requires the shaving of one's hair, and after a medical inspection, a barber comes to shave his hair. The barber had discovered several years before, a baby girl with a pentagonal tattoo on her left shoulder. The barber notices that after shaving the hair on the boy's head; that he also has a similar tattoo.

The barber introduces the boy to the girl (Maïan) whom he discovered as a baby; and they inform him that he is a clef de Babel (a key of Babel), that there are five in total and that each of them has a specific power, Maïan is able to walk through objects and walls, Maïan then explains of a disc she saw in a temple which had a marking on that was very similar to their tattoos. They agree to steal the object, which they do. The monks discover who stole it and set out to hunt down and kill the culprits, thus forcing Maïan and Liram to venture further down the tower.

== Main characters ==
- Liram

Teenage boy who is a clef de Babel and has the power to converse with animals.

- Maïan

A girl who was discovered as a baby by a barber, she's a clef de Babel, she possesses the power to traverse through objects.
