= Don't Leave Me (novel) =

Book by Stig Sæterbakken

- Cover of the first edition
- Author: Stig Sæterbakken
- Original title: Ikke forlat meg
- Translator: Seán Kinsella
- Language: Norwegian
- Publisher: Cappelen Damm
- Publication date: 2009
- Publication place: Norway
- English publication date: July 2016
- Pages: 241
- ISBN: 9788202308476

Don't Leave Me (Norwegian: Ikke forlat meg) is a 2009 novel by the Norwegian writer Stig Sæterbakken. It tells the story of a 17-year-old boy with a dark personality who falls in love with a woman for the first time, but his fear that she will leave him destroys the relationship. The story is told in reverse chronology and written in second person.

== Publication ==
The book was published in 2009 through Cappelen Damm. An English translation by Seán Kinsella is set to be published in July 2016.

== Reception ==
Anne Cathrine Straume of NRK wrote:

Sæterbakken doesn't explain, he lays out situations. And they are distinctively teenager-like, where small details in friends' word choices can get unproportional importance. ... If you aren't tempted by yet another unhappy love story, you should read Sæterbakken because of the language. This text gives me the sensation that every sentence is carefully elaborated, that the language wants something, moves towards something, grabs ahold.

Dagbladet's Maya Troberg criticised the story for being predictable, but wrote:

Don't Leave Me is a novel that comes close to formal perfection. With elegance and ease, a complex story is served—about existential loneliness and isolation, inner rage and darkness.
