= Draka =

Draka may be:

- Draka, Bulgaria, village in Sredets, Burgas Province
- Draka Holding N.V., Dutch cable manufacturer
- Fictional empire in The Domination series
- Draka Nunatak, a nunatak in Antarctica
