= Through the Night (novel) =

2011 psychological novel by Stig Sæterbakken

- First edition
- Author: Stig Sæterbakken
- Original title: Gjennom natten
- Translator: Seán Kinsella
- Language: Norwegian
- Publisher: Cappelen Damm
- Publication date: 2011
- Publication place: Norway
- English publication date: 1 June 2013
- Pages: 272
- ISBN: 9788202357993

Through the Night (Norwegian: Gjennom natten) is a 2011 novel by the Norwegian writer Stig Sæterbakken. It tells the story of a father who goes through the mourning process after his 18-year-old son commits suicide. It was Sæterbakken's last book.

The book was awarded P2-lytternes romanpris and Ungdommens kritikerpris in Norway. The English translation by Seán Kinsella was longlisted for the 2014 Best Translated Book Award.

== Reception ==
Ole Øyvind Sand Holth of Dagbladet reviewed the novel:

It is painful, but also rewarding to read, primarily because Sæterbakken writes enormously well. The language never becomes a shield or filter, quite the opposite, it drills into the darkness, with a precision and ingenuity in the use of images that paradoxically feels liberating[.] ... None of the simple constituents is particularly original, it is rather about playing with familiar motifs, but Sæterbakken shows that he masters classic, fear-inducing storytelling.

Publishers Weekly wrote about the English translation:

Saeterbakken's confident articulation of the myriad emotions and symptoms that make up Meyer's grief is a grand example of drawing universality from extreme specificity; the prose is evocative in a way that forces the reader to feel deeply the entire gamut of his particular sorrow and guilt while also being an observer of his wife divergent experience. ... Readers may lose the plot's thread in a surreal sequence towards the end, but it is not wholly disorienting. Though hardly uplifting, Saeterbakken last is notable for the beauty and heartbreak of its narration.
