= Joshua Mowll =

British writer of children's fiction (born 1970)

- Born: 1970 (age 55–56)
- Occupation: Author
- Writing career
- Genres: Historical, thriller
- Notable work: The Guild of Specialists trilogy
- Website: joshuamowll.wordpress.com

Joshua Mowll (born 1970) is a British writer of children’s fiction. His award-winning The Guild of Specialists trilogy has been published in 20 countries worldwide.

Mowll's book The Great Space Race was published in the UK on 2 August 2010

== The Guild of Specialists trilogy outline ==
The trilogy was the subject of an international bidding war in 2004. Publishers were sent boxes of artefacts and documents taken from an archive apparently bequeathed to Mowll by his recently deceased great aunt; the archive is said to have provided the material for the three books in The Guild of Specialists trilogy.

Walker Books won the auction and Operation Red Jericho was published in 2005, followed by Operation Typhoon Shore in 2006, and Operation Storm City in 2008 (May 2009 in the USA).

Mowll's books are unusual for having extensive colour illustrations linked to proper novel length plots. The writer's experience as a graphic artist for one of the UK's national newspapers, The Mail on Sunday, is evinced by an abundance of pullout illustrations, cutaway technical drawings, sketches, and maps.

There are also many photographs of characters, artefacts, and ephemera connected to the story; extensive side notes and appendices support the text.

== Summary ==
The Guild of Specialists trilogy is set in Asia in 1920 and follows the adventures of Becca and Doug MacKenzie hunting for clues to the mystery of why their parents went missing on a secret expedition to Sinkiang (Xinjiang) in the remote desert wastes of western China. It is very much Indiana Jones meets Dan Brown in genre, with secret societies, amazing weaponry and ripping-yarn villains.

== The books ==
Book 1: Operation Red Jericho

In 1920, the heroes of the story Rebecca and Doug MacKenzie, leave Shanghai aboard their uncle's ship Expedient, intent on discovering the whereabouts of their missing parents who have disappeared while on a secret mission to the deserts of Western China. Faced with terrifying bloodthirsty pirates, submarines, and deadly torpedoes, their task quickly becomes a dangerous struggle to survive. Rebecca and Doug discover the answers that they seek lie in a tangle of mysterious age-old societies guarding ancient secrets, and particularly a strange substance which lies at the heart of the mystery called Zoridium. Imprisoned on a pirate island off the China coast and facing certain death, they must find a way to escape if they are to continue their desperate quest.

Book 2: Operation Typhoon Shore.

The second book is separated from the first by only a few days. Becca and Doug's journey continues, but now the stakes are even higher than before. Their uncle's ship Expedient, partially wrecked during the battle with the pirate Sheng-Fat in Operation Red Jericho, battles through a typhoon to pursue the evil Julius Pembleton-Crozier who has taken over an archipelago of islands in the Celebes Sea. He and his confederates have and built an extremely dangerous machine there powered by the strange substance zoridium, and they must be stopped. A new array of deadly enemies and challenges face Becca and Doug. Vital clues to past and present must be found which will lead them to their ultimate goal – to discover the whereabouts of their parents.

Book 3: Operation Storm City

Operation Storm City is the final installment of the trilogy. From India to the desert wastes of China, Becca and Doug must follow every clue and scrap of information discovered so far in their adventures to guide them to the truth about their missing parents. Old friends join them in new alliances, for Becca and Doug know now that they must find Ur-Can, the fabled machine at the very heart of the story, which is hidden deep in the Taklamakan Desert – the so-called 'Desert of Death'. They now know Ur-Can holds the answers they seek, as it was the destination of their parents' lost expedition. But Ur-Can has fallen into the hands of a mad Russian general intent on using the machine's colossal power for his own evil ends. Becca and Doug are tested beyond anything they have so far endured in the trilogy as they try to conclude their grueling quest.

Awards On publication Operation Red Jericho won the prestigious Poppy Red Award for Innovation in Children's Books at the British Book Trade Awards, (2006).

Operation Typhoon Shore was listed one of the UK Government's 160 recommended reads for teenage boys in 2007. The Times, London 16.05.07

The books were well received, with Operation Red Jericho being the Sunday Times Children's Book of the Week during September 2005.

== The Guild of Specialists trilogy reviews ==
“This is not just an adventure story; it is a designer object..." Sunday Times, London 25.09.05

“Mowll's genius, though, is in his clever mixing of old and new storytelling devices, and a clear and intelligent voice that should appeal to both girls and boys..." South China Morning Post, Hong Kong 28/08/05

“...hypnotically packed with detail... " Daily Telegraph, London 09.12.06

“...beware of the cheap imitations it will undoubtedly spawn." The Guardian, London 12.11.05

“Makes an Indiana Jones adventure look half asleep" The Ultimate Teen Book Guide

“A cracking adventure... Crammed with maps, blueprints and illustrations." The Bookseller, London

“A fascinating and witty mixture of factual and fictional detail which will have any half-awake child revisiting it time and again." The Glasgow Herald, Scotland

“Presented as a mock journal with maps and diagrams, this is an intriguing debut set in Twenties Shanghai." The Observer, London

== International publication ==
The books have been published in over 20 countries worldwide.

In June 2004 it was reported in Publishing News that Walker Books had notched up its highest-ever rights sale in a fiercely contested auction for Japanese rights to Operation Red Jericho. The book was sold to Sony Magazines Inc for an undisclosed six-figure sum.

Many of the foreign editions of the trilogy have kept with the design and illustrative content of the original, although in France the trilogy has been published by Flammarion under alternative titles:

Les aventuriers du cercle, Tome 1 : Opération Zoridium

Les aventuriers du cercle, Tome 2 : Opération Typhon

Les aventuriers du cercle, Tome 3 : Opération Désert de la mort

== Post-Guild of Specialists work ==
Mowll's first book following his Guild of Specialists trilogy, called The Great Space Race, was published in the UK on 2 August 2010. It is unrelated to The Guild of Specialists trilogy, and follows a family trying to regain their fortune by landing a rocket on the Moon. In 2014, Mowll's fifth book, Beautiful Titan was made available through Amazon Kindle.
