= Norwegian Festival of Literature =

Literary festival in Lillehammer, Norway

Coordinates: 61°06′58″N 10°27′48″E

The Norwegian Festival of Literature (in Norwegian Sigrid Undset-dagene) is the biggest non commercial literary festival in the Nordic countries taking place in May/June in Lillehammer every year since 1995.

The festival includes all the Nordic countries in its scope and has developed into a popular festival where both writers and people from the book publishing industry, both domestic and foreign, are represented. The 2013-festival had over 200 events, 400 artists/writers and counted 24,173 visitors. The program consists of debates, readings, concerts, films, seminars, theater, interviews and more and the visitors are represented by kids, journalists, publishers, up and coming writers, librarians, students, translators, critics, politicians, local readers and the general public. Pegasus is the festival's offering to children and youths and consists of nearly one-third of the program.

J. M. Coetzee, Herta Müller, Amos Oz, Zadie Smith, Per Petterson, Märta Tikkanen, André Brink, Margaret Atwood, John Irving, Ko Un, Sofi Oksanen, Shaun Tan, Adonis, Antony and the Johnsons, Abdulrazak Gurnah are amongst the previous guests at the festival.

== History ==
The festival originated from the Nansen Academy's Sigrid Undset seminaries in 1993 and 1994. The festival has been named after the Norwegian author and Nobel laureate Sigrid Undset who lived in Lillehammer between 1919 and her death in 1949.Oppland county municipality has provided support for the festival since its inception. In 1999 the Norwegian government contributed financially allocating a grant in the annual state budget as an earmarked part of the budget post for the Maihaugen cultural museum in Lillehammer. In 2001 the Norwegian Publishers Association commenced regularly contributing financially. Since 2006 the festival has been classified as a "Junction Festival", which entails a separate item in the State Budget.

Artistic directors:

- Øyvind Berg between 1997 and 2003
- Birgit Hatlehol from 2004 till 2006.
- Stig Sæterbakken was artistic advisor from 2006 until October 9, 2008.
- Endre Ruset 2009-2011. (Lars Mytting had the responability during the 2011-festival.)
- Gabriel Moro was artistic adviser for the 2012-festival.
- Lina Undrum Mariussen is the current artistic adviser.

Festival directors:

- Randi Thorsen from 1997 to 2003
- Tone Kolaas from 2003 to 2006.
- Randi Skeie from 2006 until 2010
- Kjersti Stenseng 2010-2011
- The present festival director is Marit Borkenhagen starting in 2011.

Past themes

- 1999 – Damned writers
- 2000 – Folly and writers
- 2001 – Power
- 2002 – Myths
- 2003 – Crime and poetry
- 2004 – Europe
- 2005 – Conflict and reconciliation
- 2006 – Staging
- 2007 – Infidelity
- 2008 – Future
- 2009 – Truth
- 2010 - Break away
- 2011 - The city
- 2012 - Money
- 2013 - Responsibility

=== David Irving controversy in 2008/2009 ===
In October 2008 a controversy erupted over the invitation to controversial historian and Holocaust denier David Irving to speak at the 2009 festival. Several of Norway's most distinguished authors protested the invitation. Leader of the board for the festival, Jesper Holte, defended the invitation by stating that "Our agenda is to invite a liar and a falsifier of history to a festival about truth. And confront him with this". Irving has been invited to discuss his concept of truth "in light of his activity as a writer of historical books and the many accusations he has been exposed to as a consequence of this." Although Irving is introduced in the festival's webpages as "historian and writer" the board chair leader defended the more aggressive language being used to characterize Irving in connection with the controversy that had arisen. Lars Saabye Christensen and Roy Jacobsen were two authors who had threatened to boycott the festival on account of Irving's invitation and Anne B. Ragde stated that Sigrid Undset would have turned around in her grave. As the festival has as its subsidiary name "Sigrid Undset Days", a representative of Undset's family had requested that the name of the Nobel laureate be removed in connection with the festival. Also the Norwegian free speech organization Fritt Ord was critical towards letting Irving speak at the festival and had requested that its logo be removed from the festival. In addition Edvard Hoem announced that he would not attend the 2009 festival with Irving taking part. Per Edgar Kokkvold, leader of the Norwegian Press Confederation advocated cancelling Irving's invitation.

In a matter of days after the controversy had started, the invitation was rescinded. This led to the resignation of Stig Sæterbakken from his position as content director as he was the person who had invited Irving. The head of the festival, Randi Skeie, deplored what had taken place, stating "Everything is fine as long as everyone agrees, but things get more difficult when one doesn't like the views being put forward." Sæterbakken characterized his colleagues as "damned cowards" arguing that they were walking in lockstep.

According to editor-in-chief Sven Egil Omdal of Stavanger Aftenblad the opposition to Irving's participation at the festival appeared as a concerted effort and Omdal suggested campaign journalism from two of Norway's largest newspapers, Dagbladet and Aftenposten and Norway's public service broadcaster NRK.

David Irving commented that he had not been told that the festival was going to present him as a liar, and that he was preparing a lecture about the real history of what took place in Norway during World War II, contrary to what official historians have presented. Irving stated that he had thought the Norwegian people to be made of tougher stuff.

Only days after the cancellation David Irving announced that he would go to Lillehammer during the literature festival and deliver his 2-hour lecture from a hotel room.

== Other cultural festivals in Lillehammer ==
Other cultural festivals in Lillehammer following the 1994 Lillehammer Olympics are DølaJazz Lillehammer Jazzfestival, and the Amandus Festival, the latter being a festival for young Norwegian filmmakers.

== See also ==
- Bjørnson Festival
