= Solomon Crocodile =

2011 picture book by Catherine Rayner

- Author: Catherine Rayner
- Language: English
- Subject: Children's literature, Picture book
- Published: 2011 (Macmillan Children's Books)
- Publication place: England
- Media type: Print (hardback, paperback)
- Pages: 28 (unpaginated)
- ISBN: 9780230529229
- OCLC: 701020935
- Followed by: Solomon and Mortimer (2016)

Solomon Crocodile is a 2011 picture book by Catherine Rayner. It is about a mischievous crocodile called Solomon who wants to play with various birds and animals but just annoys them until he finally meets another playful crocodile.

== Reception ==
Booktrust, in a review of Solomon Crocodile, wrote that "Catherine Rayner's lovely artwork vividly depicts a lively cast of animal characters in this gorgeous picture book," found similarities between the book's illustrations and those of Quentin Blake, and concluded, "this is a picture book to treasure." The Scottish Book Trust called it a "beautifully illustrated picture book," while The Horn Book Magazine and a King County librarian recommended it for storytime.

Solomon Crocodile has also been reviewed by Kirkus Reviews, Books for Keeps, Publishers Weekly, AARP, Booklist, and School Library Journal.

== Awards ==
- 2012 Kate Greenaway Medal - shortlist
- 2012 Scottish Children's Book Award - nominee
- 2014 CPNB Picture Book of the Year - winner

== Solomon and Mortimer ==
Rayner wrote a sequel in 2016, titled Solomon and Mortimer. It involves Solomon and his new buddy Mortimer, the crocodile that Solomon met at the end of the previous book, getting up to further mischief.

== See also ==
- The Enormous Crocodile
