= Carina Rozenfeld =

French writer

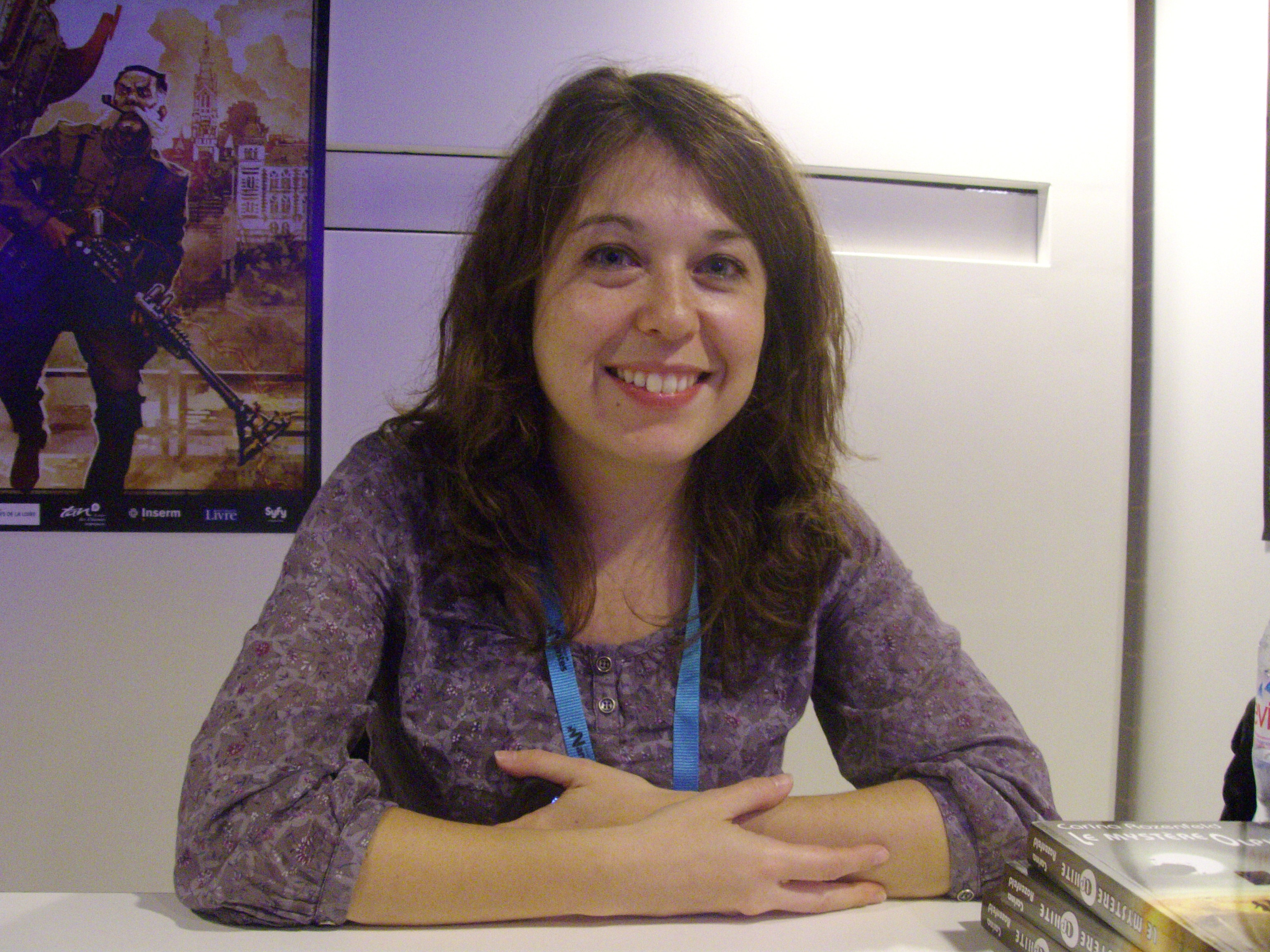
- Carina Rozenfeld at Utopiales, 2011
- Born: 13 February 1972 (age 54); Paris, France
- Occupation: author
- Known for: children's books, science-fiction and fantasy genres

Carina Rozenfeld (born 13 February 1972 in Paris) is a French author who writes children's books in the science-fiction and fantasy genres. In 2004, her first novel Lucille et les dragons sourds was published.

== Publications ==
- Lucille et les dragons sourds, 2004
- Le Mystère Olphite, 2008
- La Quête des Livre-Monde - tome 1 - Le Livre des Âmes, 2008
- Les Clefs de Babel, 2009
- La Quête des Livres Monde - tome 2 - Le Livre des Lieux, 2010
- À la poursuite des humutes, 2010
- Doregon, - tome 1 - Les Portes de Doregon, 2010
- Doregon, - tome 2 - La Guerre de l'ombre, 2011
- La Quête des Livres Monde - tome 3 - Le Livre du temps, 2012
- Doregon, - tome 3 - Les Cracheurs de lumière, 2012
- Phænix - tome 1 - Les Cendres de l'oubli, 2012
- Phænix - tome 2 - Le Brasier des souvenirs, 2013
- Les sentinelles du futur, 2013.

== Miscellaneous ==
- Le Guide des 100 plus belles plages du monde, éd. Grands Voyageurs, 2004
- Le Guide du voyage de noces, éd. Grands Voyageurs, 2005
- Graines de voyageurs - Normandie, 2008
