= Green Power =

Environmental NGO in Hong Kong

Green Power is a non-governmental environmental organization based in Hong Kong. It was established in 1988 and focuses on promoting awareness of environmental issues and sustainable practices, primarily through education and community outreach programs.

== Green Power Hike ==
Since 1994, Green Power has organised the Green Power Hike, an annual fundraising event held along the Hong Kong Trail. The event raises funds to support the organization's environmental education initiatives, which target students in kindergartens, primary schools, and secondary schools. Green Power also develops programs aimed at the conservation of local ecosystems, including initiatives to protect butterfly habitats in Hong Kong.
