= Prada and Prejudice =

2009 young adult novel by Mandy Hubbard

- First edition cover
- Author: Mandy Hubbard
- Publisher: Razorbill
- Publication date: June 2009
- ISBN: 978-1-59514-260-3

Prada and Prejudice is a young adult novel by Mandy Hubbard, published by Razorbill in 2009.

The novel tells the story of Callie, a 15-year-old girl who buys a pair of designer heels while on a school trip, falls, and wakes up in 19th-century England.

== Reception ==
A review in Publishers Weekly called Prada and Prejudice "a fast-reading, playful novel", noting its humor and themes of feeling out of place. Donna Miller, writing for the Journal of Adolescent & Adult Literacy, praised the novel for its moral lessons about popularity and peer pressure but considered the plot to be clichéd. Jennifer Schultz agreed that "some aspects of the book and character traits are stock and predictable" in a review for the School Library Journal, but nevertheless found the novel entertaining and humorous. Irene Cooper of Booklist stated that "if you don't look too closely, there is fun to be had here".
