= In the Valley of the Kings =

2009 collection of short stories by Terrence E. Holt

- Cover of the first edition
- Author: Terrence E. Holt
- Cover artist: Ruth Martin
- Language: English
- Genre: New Wave sci-fi, eschatological fiction, Lovecraftian horror, psychological thriller, experimental, occult detective fiction, existentialist fiction, supernatural fiction
- Publisher: W.W. Norton
- Publication date: September 14, 2009
- Publication place: United States
- Media type: Print (hardcover)
- Pages: 224
- ISBN: 978-0-393-07121-4

In the Valley of the Kings: Stories is a collection of short stories by the American author, doctor and former professor Terrence Holt. It was published on September 14, 2009, by W. W. Norton & Company.

The book, Holt's only publication, garnered the author a large following and much positive appraisal. In the Valley of the Kings has been praised by Pulitzer Prize winner Junot Díaz, National Book Award winner Gerald Stern, and National Book Award finalist Aleksandar Hemon, among other reviewers. Various stories from the book have individually been featured in the O. Henry Prize Stories, The Kenyon Review and Best of Zoetrope periodicals.

Holt's book crosses a number of genres, placing several short stories in outer space under a Lovecraftian science fiction theme, while others are highly minimal in setting or consistently focus on the narrator's voice. Nearly all of the works exhibit an element of suspense and sometimes horror as well as an experimental or absurdist tendency.

The book's cover art, a semi-transparent detail on a dark blue background, was produced by Ruth Martin.

== Plot summaries ==
In the Valley of the Kings is divided into eight sections (according to the inner lining of the book's dust jacket, "seven short stories and one novella"), each with its own diverse plot and setting.

=== "Ό Λογος" ===
An investigative journalist stumbles upon and relates a tale of events regarding an incurable disease as it progresses throughout the world. The outbreak begins with a small child, Tabitha Van Order, who reads the term "Ό Λογος" in a newspaper local to a town in upstate New York. The girl slowly becomes ill and increasingly debilitated before she dies and post-mortem is examined by autopsy workers. Although according to the morticians, there is no conceivable physical cause of death, it is noted that an inscrutable Greek phrase, the aforementioned "Ό Λογος", had appeared subcutaneously etched into her skin for three days prior to her death. These marks were particularly noticeable on Tabitha's hands and forehead.

Later on, all the physicians who had previously examined the girl's body are found dead. All have expired by various means, the only pattern being that before death every one of them succumbed to a strange, crippling state of mystical psychosis.

While the story portrays the phrase "Ό Λογος" as if it were undecipherable, in reality the Greek may roughly translate to "logos" or "word".

=== "My Father's Heart" ===
This story revolves around the life of a man who keeps his deceased father's still-beating and somehow sentient and mobile heart in a glass jar above his fireplace.

=== "Charybdis" ===
"Charybdis" concerns the fate of a doomed astronaut whose spacecraft is irreversibly heading towards the surface of the Sun.

=== "Aurora" ===
A self-aware, post-human, cyborg spacecraft struggles with existential perils as it finds itself forever stranded among the rings of Saturn. The machine attempts to come to terms with the reality and memories of its human past while still accepting its destiny as a now lone, purposeless fragment of consciousness trapped within the hull of a robotic mechanism.

=== "Eurydike" ===
This story presents a foreboding and terror-driven psychological horror about a man who awakens in a disheveled and abandoned building complex located on the surface of a distant planet, suffering from total amnesia and not knowing who he is or where he comes from.

=== "In the Valley of the Kings ===
The eponymous and longest section of the book (deemed a novella by the author), In the Valley of the Kings tells the story of an obsessive Egyptologist who has discovered the most massive underground structure ever built: a giant tomb for an unnameable God-king of ancient Egypt whose powers of immortality the researcher tries to unveil, all while fighting a debilitating disease.

=== "Scylla" ===
A retired and nostalgic sailor has been made bitter by an institution known only as the "Law".

=== "Apocalypse" ===
"Apocalypse" depicts an end-of-the-world scenario from the point of view of a married man living in a suburban area crumbling in anarchy in the wake of an inter-galactic, impending doom.
