= Carter Finally Gets It =

2009 young adult novel by Brent Crawford

- Author: Brent Crawford
- Language: English
- Genre: Young adult novel
- Publisher: Hyperion Books
- Publication date: April 7, 2009
- Publication place: United States
- Media type: Print
- Pages: 300
- ISBN: 1-4231-1246-6
- OCLC: 244065119
- Followed by: Carter's Big Break

Carter Finally Gets It is a 2009 young adult novel by Brent Crawford. The novel follows the misadventures of William Carter, who has ADD, as he enters his first year of high school. He must face bullies, rejection, and going to the same school as his sister. It won't be easy, especially when his friends start having more fun than him. But he makes it through eventually.

== Reception ==
Critics gave generally positive reviews to Crawford's first novel. The School Library Journal said "Crawford's debut is hysterical from start to finish." While Booklist commented "[Crawford’s] stream-of-consciousness, first-person narrative flails around in an excellent imitation of a freshman, complete with volume changes, dumb jokes, and sudden flashes of elation and despair. Occasionally poignant and frequently hilarious."
