= Nami Mun =

American novelist

- Born: Seoul, South Korea
- Education: University of California, Berkeley; University of Michigan (MFA)
- Occupations: Novelist; short story writer
- Writing career
- Notable awards: Whiting Award (2009)

Nami Mun is a Korean American novelist and short story writer.

== Life ==
Nami Mun was born in Seoul, South Korea, though she grew up in The Bronx. She graduated from University of California, Berkeley, and from the University of Michigan, with an MFA.

Her stories have been published in Granta, Pushcart Prize Anthology, The Iowa Review, Evergreen Review, Witness, Bat City Review, and Tin House.

== Awards ==
- 2012 Chicago Public Library 21st Century Award
- 2009 Orange Prize finalist
- 2009 Whiting Award

== Works ==
=== Books ===
- Miles From Nowhere. Penguin Group. 2009. ISBN 978-1-59448-854-2.

=== Short stories ===
- "The Anniversary". Granta (114: Aliens). Spring 2011. (Subscription Required)
