= The Guild of Specialists trilogy =

The Guild of Specialists
- Operation Red Jericho (2005); Operation Typhoon Shore (2006); Operation Storm City (2009)
- Author: Joshua Mowll
- Country: United Kingdom
- Publisher: Walker Books
- Media type: Print (Hardback & Paperback)

The Guild of Specialists trilogy is a series of novels by British children's author Joshua Mowll, published by Walker Books. The series follows the lives of Rebecca and Douglas MacKenzie in their quest to find their parents after they had gone missing on an expedition to the Sinkiang desert in China. They meet up with their uncle, now guardian, Captain Fitzroy MacKenzie, who welcomes them onto his ship, the Expedient. They stumble upon the Guild of Specialists, a secret society of which their uncle is a part, as they embark upon their journey. Slowly, they begin to uncover the secrets of the Guild and begin to wonder what their parents had been looking for in the Sinkiang desert.

The first book in the series, Operation Red Jericho, was published in 2005. The trilogy concluded with Operation Storm City, published in 2009.

== Books ==
- Operation Red Jericho (2005)
- Operation Typhoon Shore (2006)
- Operation Storm City (2009)
