= Stig Sæterbakken =

Norwegian author and translator

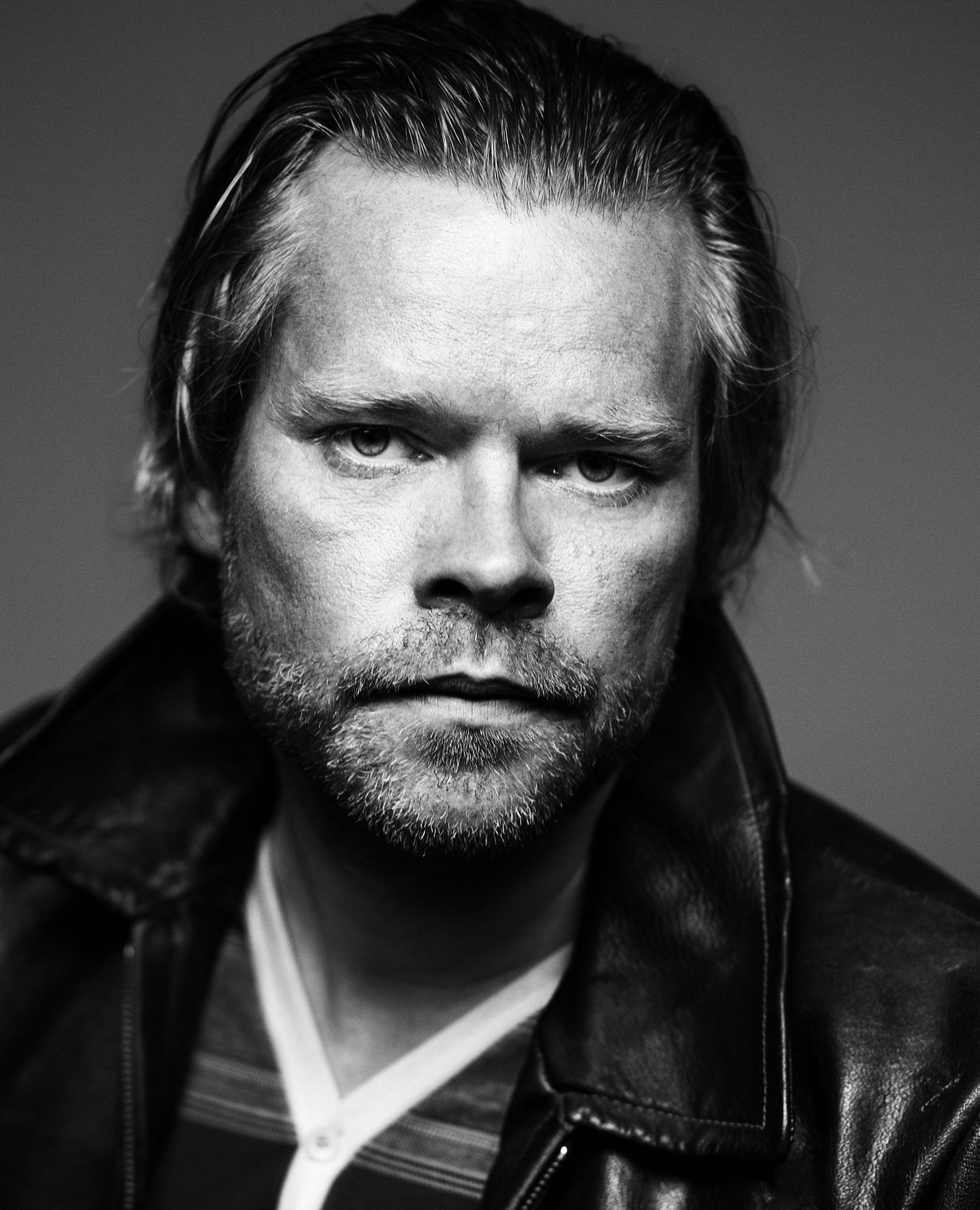
- Stig Sæterbakken in 2007
- Born: 4 January 1966; Lillehammer, Norway
- Died: 24 January 2012 (aged 46); Norway
- Occupation: Writer

Stig Sæterbakken (4 January 1966 – 24 January 2012) was a Norwegian author. He wrote novels, essays and poems, and worked as a translator.

== Life and career ==
Stig Sæterbakken published his first book at the age of 18, a collection of poems called Floating Umbrellas, while still attending Lillehammer Senior High School. In 1991, Sæterbakken released his first novel, Incubus, followed by The New Testament in 1993. Estetisk salighet (Aesthetic Bliss) (1994) collected five years of work as an essayist.

Sæterbakken returned to prose in 1997 with the novel Siamese, which marks a significant departure in his style. The following year saw the release of Self-Control. And in 1999, he published Sauermugg. The three books, the S-trilogy—as they are often called—were published in a collected edition in 2000.

In February 2001, Sæterbakken's second collection of essays, The Evil Eye was released. As with Aesthetic Bliss, this book also represents a summing up and a closing of a new phase in the authorship. In many ways the essays throw light on Sæterbakken's own prose over the last years, the S-trilogy in particular.

Siamese was released in Sweden by Vertigo. Vertigo followed up with a translation of Sauermugg in April 2007. This edition, however, was different from the Norwegian original. It included some of the later published Sauermugg-monologues, together with left overs from the time the book was written, about 50 pages of new material all together. The expanded edition was entitled Sauermugg Redux. Siamese has since been translated into Danish, Czech and English.

Sæterbakken's last novels were The Visit, Invisible Hands, Don't Leave Me and Through the Night. He was awarded the Osloprisen (Oslo Prize) in 2006 for The Visit. Invisible Hands was nominated for both the P2-listener's Novel prize and Youth's Critics' Prize in 2007. The same year he was awarded the Critics Prize and Bokklubbene's Translation Prize for his translation of Nikanor Teratologen's Assisted Living.

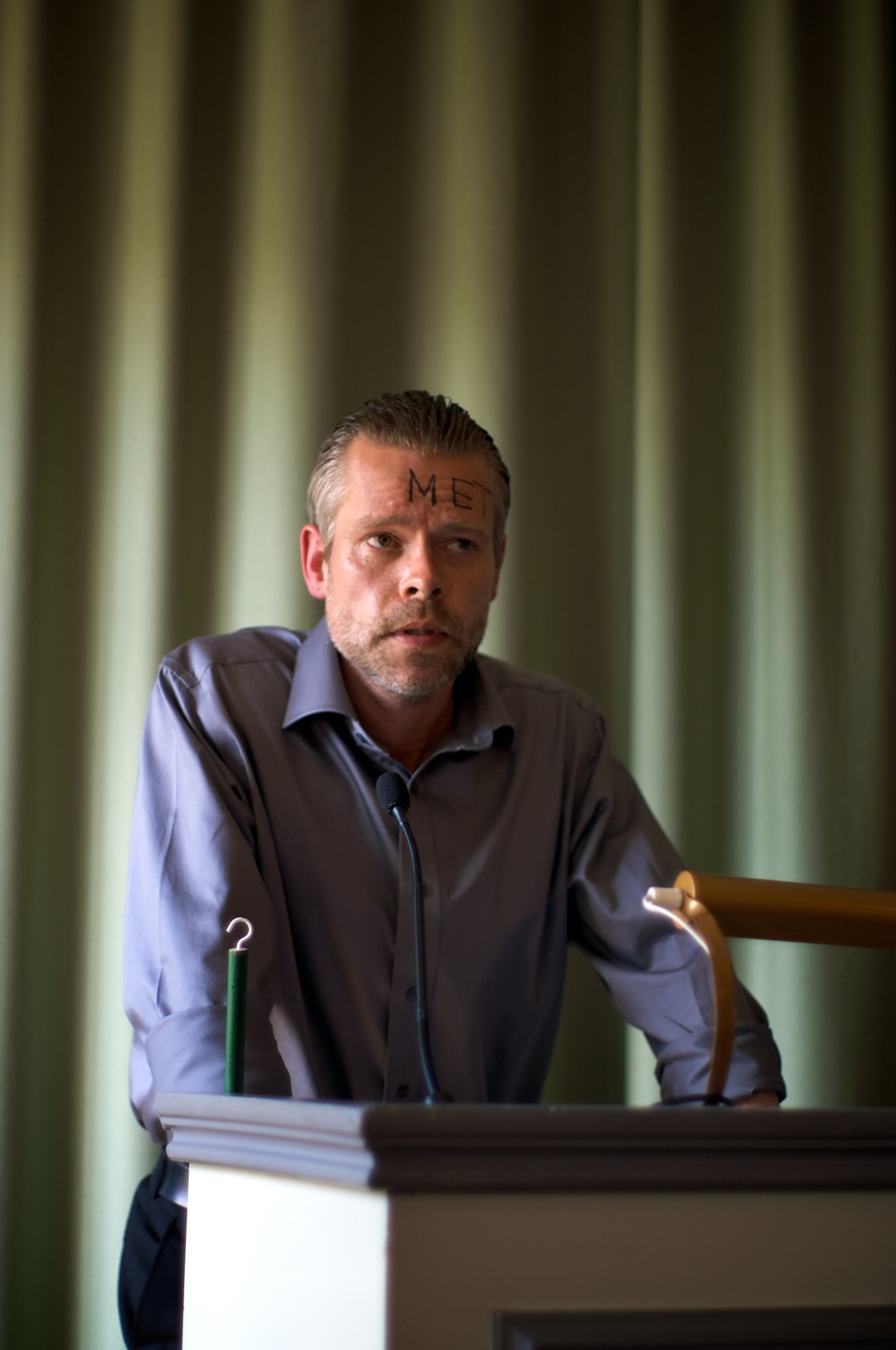
Sæterbakken at the 2009 Norwegian Festival of Literature

Sæterbakken was artistic director of The Norwegian Festival of Literature from 2006 until October 2008, when he resigned owing to the controversy which arose when David Irving was invited to the festival in 2009 (see below).

Sæterbakken's books were released and translated in several countries, among them Russia and US. April 2009 Flamme Forlag released an essay by Sæterbakken, in their series of book-singles, called Yes. No. Yes.

Sæterbakken committed suicide on January 24, 2012, aged 46.

== David Irving controversy in 2008 ==
In October 2008 Sæterbakken angrily resigned from his position as content director of the 2009 Norwegian Festival of Literature at Lillehammer. This followed the decision by the board of the festival on October 8/9 to renege on an invitation to controversial author and Holocaust denier David Irving to speak at the festival. Sæterbakken was the initiator of the invitation. A media storm had erupted in Norway over Irving's appearance and several high-profile writers had denounced the initiative and called for a boycott of the festival. Even Norway's free speech organization Fritt Ord had requested that its logo be removed from the festival. Sæterbakken characterized his colleagues as "damned cowards" arguing that they were walking in lockstep.

== Bibliography ==
Year	Title	Type	Publisher
1984	Flytende paraplyer	Poetry	Cappelen
1985	23 dikt	Poetry	Self-published
1986	Sverdet ble til et barn	Poetry	Cappelen
1988	Vandrebok	Short stories	Cappelen
1991	Incubus	Novel	Cappelen
1993	Det nye testamentet	Novel	Cappelen
1994	Estetisk salighet	Essays	Cappelen
1997	Siamese (Siamesisk)	Novel	Cappelen
1998	Self-Control (Selvbeherskelse)	Novel	Cappelen
1999	Sauermugg	Novel	Cappelen
2001	Det onde øye	Essays	Cappelen
2003	Kapital	Novel	Cappelen
2006	Besøket	Novel	Cappelen
2007	Invisible Hands (Usynlige hender)	Novel	Cappelen
2009	Ja. Nei. Ja	Essay	Flamme Forlag
2009	Don't Leave Me (Ikke forlat meg)	Novel	Cappelen Damm
2010	Dirty Things	Essays	Cappelen Damm
2010	Umuligheten av å leve	Essay	Flamme Forlag
2011	Through the Night (Gjennom natten)	Novel	Cappelen Damm
2011	Det fryktinngydende	Essay	Flamme Forlag
2011	De Press: Block to Block	Non-fiction	Falck Forlag
2012	Essays i utvalg	Essays	Cappelen Damm
2012	Der jeg tenker er det alltid mørkt	Essays	Flamme Forlag

== Books translated to English ==
- "Siamese"(originally published in Norwegian in 1997)issued by Dalkey Archive Press (Champaign, Illinois, USA), January 2010. Translated by Stokes Schwartz.
- "Self-Control" issued by Dalkey Archive Press (Champaign, Illinois, US), November 2012. Translated by Sean Kinsella
- "Through the Night" issued by Dalkey Archive Press (Champaign, Illinois, US), June 2013. Translated by Sean Kinsella. Long-listed for Best Translated Book Award 2014.
