= The Retreat (Jones book) =

The Retreat: Hitler's First Defeat
- Author: Michael K. Jones
- Language: English
- Subject: non-fiction book, German military history, Russian military history, World War II
- Published: 2009 (John Murray)
- Publication place: England
- Media type: Print (hardback)
- Pages: 328
- ISBN: 9780719569524
- OCLC: 429599280

The Retreat: Hitler's First Defeat is a 2009 book by military historian Michael K. Jones. It is about the Battle of Moscow concentrating on the German retreat from Moscow during 1941-1942.

== Contents ==
In the shadow of Napoleon
Typhoon
At the gates of Moscow
The tipping point
Ten days in December
Stand fast!
"This is all there really is?"
Looking into the abyss
Enter General Model
The first butterfly of Spring
The grand illusion

== Publishing history ==
- 2009, The Retreat: Hitler's First Defeat (John Murray) ISBN 9780719569524
- 2010, The Retreat: Hitler's First Defeat (Thomas Dunne Books) ISBN 9780312628192

== Reception ==
A reviewer of The Retreat in Adrian Gilbert's War Books Review, wrote "On the whole, Jones’ approach works very well, giving the reader a discomfiting vision of the hideous nature of the war on the Eastern Front." and although critical of Jones overusing available source material, concluded "The Retreat is a fine piece of work, which shows the horror of the Moscow campaign in all its searing detail."

The Library Journal found it to be "Fluently written with good sourcing" and Booklist called it "Sound and readable."

The Retreat has also been reviewed by Kirkus Reviews, Publishers Weekly, the Sunday Times, and News Weekly.
