= Terrence Holt (writer) =

American novelist

Terrence "Terry" E. Holt M.D. (sometimes credited as "T. E. Holt") is an American Geriatric Internal doctor, and writer as well as a former professor of literature at Rutgers University and Swarthmore College.

== Biography ==
He graduated from Cornell University, and from University of North Carolina, Chapel Hill.

His single debut book, a collection of short stories entitled In the Valley of the Kings, which was praised by Pulitzer Prize winner Junot Díaz, National Book Award winner Gerald Stern, National Book Award finalist Aleksandar Hemon.

== Works ==
- In the Valley of the Kings: Stories. W W Norton. 2010. ISBN 978-0-393-33908-6.; W.W. Norton. ISBN 978-0-393-07121-4.
- Internal Medicine: A Doctor's Stories, Liveright Publishing Corporation, 2015, ISBN 9781631490873
