= Alexander Genis =

Author and broadcaster (b. 1953)

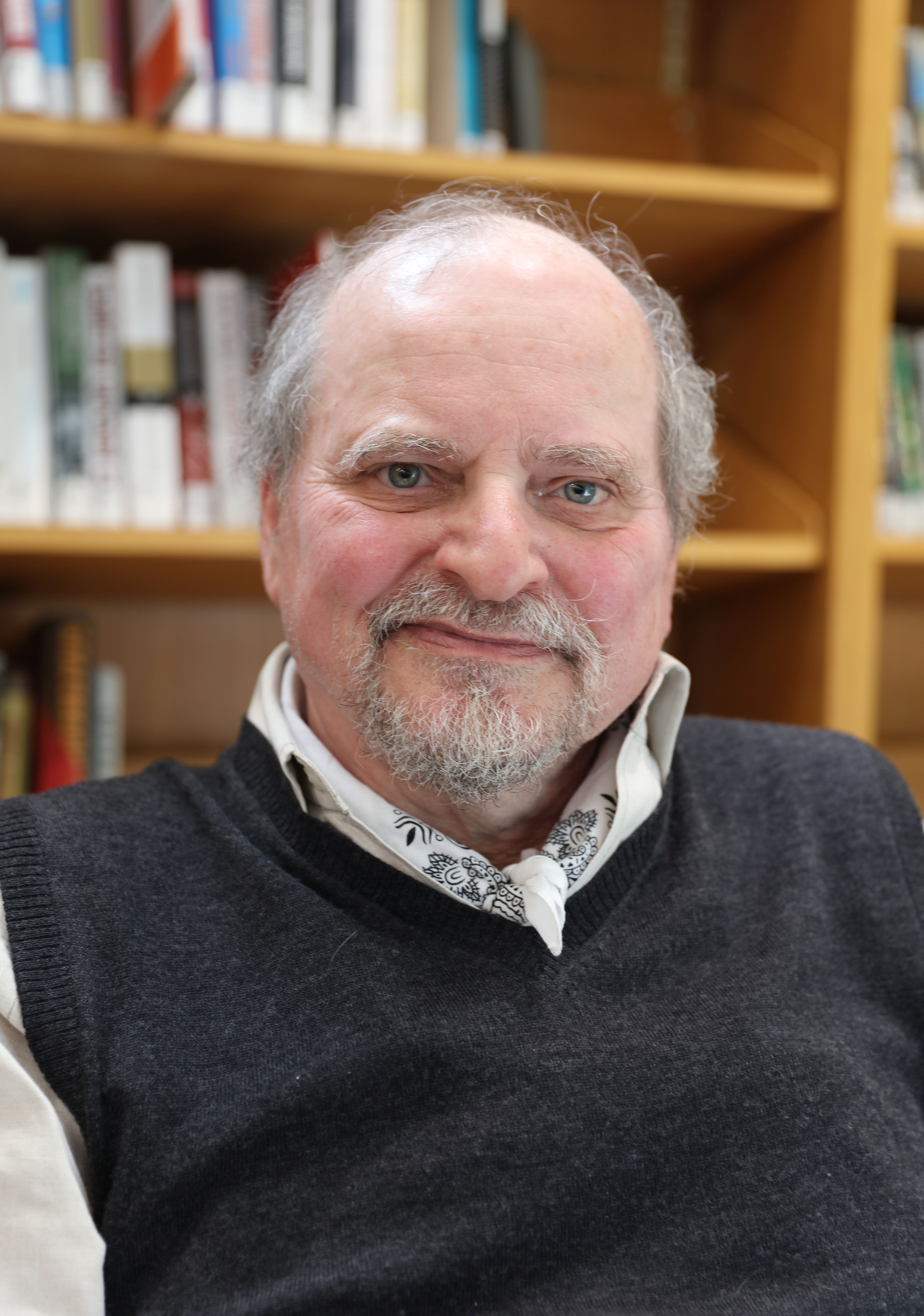
- Genis in 2018
- Born: February 11, 1953 (age 73); Ryazan', Russia
- Occupations: Author, broadcaster, cultural critic
- Children: Daniel

Alexander Genis (born February 11, 1953) is a Russian–American writer, broadcaster, and cultural critic. He has written more than a dozen non-fiction books.

Genis, an American citizen, resides in the New York City area. He is the father of Daniel Genis, writer and journalist.

== Life and career ==
Genis was born in Ryazan, Russian SFSR, in 1953. After graduating from the Latvian State University in Riga, he immigrated to the USA in 1977 at the age of 24.

Genis is an anchorman of the weekly radio-show American Hour with Alexander Genis, broadcast in Russian by Radio Liberty since the 1990s. Genis is a columnist and a contributing writer for the main liberal Russian newspaper Novaya Gazeta, and used to be the host of the TV show Alexander Genis. Letters from America, shown on Russian TV channel "Culture".

In September 2024, Genis was listed in Russia as a foreign agent. His new book in 2025 about totalitarian regimes was inspired by Dmitry Muratov and is all about Vladimir Putin without mentioning him - "In this book, of course, there is no word “Ukraine,” no “war with Ukraine,” and no “Putin.” But, on the other hand, the whole book is just about that."

== Bibliography ==
- fashizmy, 2025
- Red bread (collection of essays).
- USA from A to Y (cultural travelogue from the outside in).
- Knit (autobiographical essays).
- Darkness and Stillness (meditations).
- 6 Fingers (intellectual autobiography).
- Candy Wrappers( analysis of classical Russian paintings).
- Ginger-man (culinary essays).
- The Tower of Babel (cultural criticism).
- Dovlatov and his Environs (non-fiction novel, as of 2016 it had 6 publications in Russian).
- Ivan Petrovich is dead (essays on modern Russian literature).
- Ticket to China (cultural criticism).
- A Particular Case (essays on writers).
- Portrait of the Poet: 1978–1996 : Joseph Brodsky (Essay in English and Russian).
