= Invisible Hand (TV series) =

Invisible hand (Polish: Niewidzialna ręka) is a TV series by Maciej Zimiński. The program was aired by public Polish Television (Telewizja Polska) in 1960s and 1970s during two programs for kids and youth: "Ekran z bratkiem" and "Teleranek".

== TV series (1960s-1970s) ==
The form of this TV series targeted mostly scouts and shaping their social values by directing their energy towards selflessly helping others. In order to draw the young people into not-for-profit voluntary actions (altruism), the series presented the para-intelligence ambience. The narrator's face was not presented only his silhouette. Also the guidance was in a set style: secret welcoming and farewell: "Niewidzialna ręka to także ty" (English – "Invisible hand is also yourself"). The you was supposed to realise the tasks of interest-free help to others, especially elderly and sick but in a way that no one could see them, and the helper was only to leave a hand-stamp as symbolic signature. Only the feeling of providing a service that was needed was to fulfill the satisfaction. Participants were reporting in writing by describing the task implementation and own performance on assignment, and the selected ones were presented during the program on air.

== Visible hand (2020 social movement) ==
In response to the outbreak of COVID-19 in 2020 in Poland, a grass root Facebook-based social movement was initiated under the name "Widzialna ręka" (English – visible hand). The movement founders were openly referring to the concept of the "Invisible hand" TV series.

"Visible hand" started with group for Poland, but quickly grew to self organized groups in various cities in Poland, districts and English language group for migrants in Poland (later renamed to: "Visible hand - internationals in Poland") and also one for Polish-Ukrainian support in Poland, and Polish diaspora in several cities abroad (UK, The Netherlands). The group members communicate on a Facebook group with posts marked either #ineed or #icanhelp. The services exchanged are of wide variety from walking dogs to shopping for elderly, from products sharing to legal advice.
