= Michael Meyer (travel writer) =

American travel writer

Michael Meyer (Chinese: 梅英东), is an American travel writer and Professor of English at the University of Pittsburgh.

== Education and early career ==
Meyer graduated from University of Wisconsin–Madison with a BS in Education. He first went to China in 1995 with the Peace Corps. Following Peace Corps, he graduated from the University of California, Berkeley, where he studied writing under Adam Hochschild and Maxine Hong Kingston. In 2005, he completed an Inter-University Program of Advanced Studies in Chinese at Tsinghua University in Beijing. Meyer also completed an International Chinese Language Program in 2022 at National Taiwan University in Taipei.

== Books ==
Meyer is the author of The Last Days of Old Beijing: Life in the Vanishing Backstreets of a City Transformed, In Manchuria: A Village Called Wasteland and the Transformation of Rural China and The Road to Sleeping Dragon: Learning China from the Ground Up. Meyer has also written A Dirty, Filthy Book: Sex, Scandal, and One Woman’s Fight in the Victorian Trial of the Century, and Benjamin Franklin’s Last Bet. The Favorite Founder’s Divisive Death, Enduring Afterlife, and Blueprint for American Prosperity.

In his debut book, The Last Days of Old Beijing, Meyer uses Beijing's past to describe its modernization and subsequent destruction as China itself transformed. Throughout In Manchuria, Meyer documents one of China's first organic rice-farming village's transformation into a company-run town. The book also illustrates how the region’s history informs contemporary Chinese life. Meyer's third book, The Road to Sleeping Dragon, details his experience when first moving to China with the Peace Corps in 1995 and his efforts learning a new language, history, and culture in the midst of China's rapid modernization. After a five-year clearance delay, his book The Last Days of Old Beijing was published in mainland China 2013.

In Benjamin Franklin's Last Bet, Meyer explores Franklin's plan to support tradesman in Philadelphia and Boston and how this plan boosted each city's economy and created the framework for modern day wealth and notions of the American Dream. In his most recent work, A Dirty, Filthy Book, Meyer writes about Annie Besant, who is defending herself on trial in London 1877 for publishing her pamphlet on birth control.

== Career ==
Meyer's work has appeared in The New York Times, Time, Smithsonian, the New York Times Book Review, the Financial Times, Reader’s Digest, Harper's, The Atlantic, the Los Angeles Times, the Chicago Tribune, The Iowa Review, and on This American Life. His writing is known for its blend of immersive reporting and archival history, covering a wide array of subjects, from food to sport to nature to news. Meyer has reported from mainland China, Hong Kong, Taiwan, Mongolia, Japan, Vietnam, Laos, Singapore, Russia, Ireland, the United Kingdom, and the United States.

In China, he has represented the National Geographic Society’s Center for Sustainable Destinations, training China’s UNESCO World Heritage Site managers in preservation practices.

He divides his year between London and Pittsburgh, where he is a Professor of English at the University of Pittsburgh, teaching nonfiction writing. Meyer has also completed work as a Visiting Professor at the Journalism and Media Studies Center at the University of Hong Kong. He is currently Electus Faculty at the University of Pittsburgh's David C. Frederick Honors College and a Faculty Director of the Pitt in London and Pitt Honors at Oxford University Programs.

Meyer is also an avid long distance runner.

== Awards ==
- 2025 Provost’s Award for Excellence in Undergraduate Student Success.
- 2024 The Berlin Prize - Residency at the American Academy in Berlin
- 2024 HOLTZBRINCK FELLOW - American Academy in Berlin
- 2023 Honorary Doctorate, Franklin Cummings Institute of Technology, Boston
- 2023 University of Pittsburgh Chancellor’s Distinguished Teaching Award
- 2021-22 U.S. Fulbright Scholar to Taiwan
- 2021-22 Visiting Scholar, Oxford Centre for Life-Writing, University of Oxford
- 2020 Fellow at MacDowell
- 2018 Lowell Thomas Award winner for Best Travel Book
- 2016-17 National Endowment for the Humanities Public Scholar award
- 2015 Lowell Thomas Award winner for Best Travel Book
- 2014 Fellow, National Committee on US-China Relations Public Intellectuals Program
- 2011 Rockefeller Foundation Bellagio Center Residency
- 2010-11 Resident at the Cullman Center for Scholars & Writers, New York Public Library
- 2010 Guggenheim Fellowship
- 2010 Fellow, Dorothy and Lewis B. Cullman Center for Scholars and Writers at the New York Public Library
- 2010 Whiting Writer's Award for Nonfiction, Mrs. Giles Whiting Foundation
- 2009 Paul Cowan Prize, Best Nonfiction Book, Peace Corps Writers
- 2005 Lowell Thomas Award winner for excellence in travel writing

== Works ==
- "The Last Days of Old Beijing". National Geographic Intelligent Traveler. May 13, 2009. Archived from the original on June 7, 2010.

=== Books ===
- A Dirty, Filthy Book: Sex, Scandal, and One Woman’s Fight in the Victorian Trial of the Century. PenguinUK. February 2024; 2025 paperback subtitle: Annie Besant’s Fight for Reproductive Rights.
- Benjamin Franklin’s Last Bet. The Favorite Founder’s Divisive Death, Enduring Afterlife, and Blueprint for American Prosperity. Mariner/HarperCollins. April 2022.
- The Road to Sleeping Dragon: Learning China from the Ground Up. Bloomsbury. 2017. ISBN 978-1-6328-69357.
- In Manchuria: A Village Called Wasteland and the Transformation of Rural China. Bloomsbury. 2015. ISBN 978-1-6204-0286-3. (book interview and book talk)
- The Last Days of Old Beijing: Life in the Vanishing Backstreets of a City Transformed. Walker & Company. 2009. ISBN 978-0-8027-1750-4. (book interview)
