= Catherine Rayner =

British illustrator and author (born 1982)

Catherine Rayner (born 1982) is an Edinburgh-based British illustrator and writer of children's books. She was born in Harrogate and grew up in Boston Spa, later studying at Leeds College of Art and Edinburgh College of Art.

She won the Kate Greenaway Medal in 2009 for Harris Finds his Feet, and has been shortlisted in 2007, 2011, 2012, 2015.

In 2014, Norris, The Bear Who Shared was named by The Sunday Times as one of the 100 Children's Modern Classics of the past ten years.

== Works ==
=== Writer and illustrator ===
- Augustus and his Smile, Little Tiger Press, 2006
- Harris Finds his Feet, Little Tiger Press, 2008
- Sylvia and Bird, Little Tiger Press, 2009
- Ernest, Macmillan Children's Books, 2009
- Norris, The Bear who Shared, Orchard Books, 2010
- Iris and Isaac, Little Tiger Press, 2010
- Solomon Crocodile, Macmillan Children's Books, 2011
- Abigail, Little Tiger Press, 2013
- Smelly Louie, Macmillan Children's Books, 2014
- Solomon and Mortimer, Macmillan Children's Books 2016

=== Illustrator ===
- Posy, written by Linda Newberry, Orchard Books, 2008
- The Tales of Olga Da Polga, written by Michael Bond, Oxford University Press, 2011
- Gobbolino the Witch's Cat, written by Ursula Moray Williams, Macmillan, 2012
- Tiger Tale, written by Holly Webb, Scholastic, 2014
- Clare and her Captain, written by Michael Morpurgo, published 2015

== Awards ==
- 2006 Winner – Best New Illustrator Award, Booktrust Early Year Awards, Augustus and his Smile
- 2008 Winner – Booktrust Best New Illustrator Award
- 2009 Winner – CILIP Kate Greenaway Medal, Harris Finds His Feet
- 2010 Winner – Top Ten New Illustrators 2000 – 2010
- 2010 Winner – The English Association English 4-11 Book Awards (Key Stage One Fiction), Ernest
- 2011 Winner – Coventry Inspiration Book Awards, Ernest
- 2012 Winner – UKLA Children's Book Award, Iris and Isaac
- 2014 Winner – Picture Book of the Year in The Netherlands by the CPNB, Solomon Crocodile
- 2015 Winner – Peter's Book of the Year, Smelly Louie
- 2021 Mathical Honors - One Happy Tiger
