= Invisible Hands (novel) =

2007 novel by Stig Sæterbakken

Invisible hands
- Author: Stig Sæterbakken
- Original title: Usynlige hender
- Translator: Seán Kinsella
- Language: Norwegian
- Publisher: Cappelen Damm
- Publication date: 2007
- Publication place: Norway
- English publication date: 22 July 2016
- Pages: 213
- ISBN: 9788202275198

Invisible hands (Norwegian: Usynlige hender) is a 2007 novel by Norwegian author Stig Sæterbakken. It tells the story of an inspector who investigates the case of a missing girl and begins a destructive love affair with girl's mother.

== Plot ==
Chief inspector Kristian Wold is assigned to a one-year-old missing persons case. The commission from his superiors is not to be mistaken: a final review before the case is closed. However, Kristian's conscience forces him to comply when Inger Danielsen, mother of the 14-year-old girl who is missing, asks to see him. The meeting holds unexpected consequences for both of them. As Kristian feels obliged to continue an investigation that has so far been fruitless, an emotional tension is ignited between him and the mother. Inexorably, the two are drawn towards each other, in what will become a love affair against all odds, with a disastrous end awaiting.

== Publication ==
The book was published in 2007 through Cappelen. An English translation by Seán Kinsella is set to be published on 22 July 2016.

== Reception ==
Kurt Hanssen of Dagbladet called Invisible Hands "a very strong novel, written with a precise and economical language where every word has meaning and weight, where there is barely a single cliché, where the merciless passion is responsible for the progression."
