= The Rise and Fall of the Christian Coalition =

The Rise and Fall of the Christian Coalition is Joel D. Vaughan's insider's history of the organization. Released by Wipf & Stock in 2009, Vaughan's is the only history of the organization that received much credit for the 1994 Republican takeover of both houses of Congress.

== Background ==
The Christian Coalition was founded in 1989 by religious broadcaster and former Republican presidential candidate M. G. "Pat" Robertson. The Christian Coalition sought to identify ten anti-abortion voters in each of America's 175,000 precincts. Robertson hired University of Georgia doctoral student Ralph E. Reed, Jr., to run the organization and watched Reed take it to greater heights in American politics.

When Reed left the Christian Coalition in 1997 in order to become a full-time Republican political consultant, Robertson brought in Ronald Reagan's Interior Secretary Donald P. Hodel as president and former Representative from Washington State Randy Tate as executive director. Hodel resigned two years later out of a dispute with Robertson over the direction and principles represented by the organization, and Tate left later the same year.

Robertson then brought in board member and South Carolina state chairman Roberta Combs as executive vice president, before turning over the presidency to her in late 2001.

Joel D. Vaughan began with Reed in 1989 as a volunteer, stuffing envelopes and hammering in yard signs. In 1991, he joined the field department, becoming deputy national field director in 1993. He joined Hodel's staff in 1997 as special assistant to the president and was promoted to director of administration in 1998.

Currently serving as Chief of Staff for Focus on the Family, Vaughan has been at the forefront of the Christian Right for over two decades, and alongside its most notable leaders: (in chronological order) Robertson, Reed, Hodel, Dr. James Dobson, and Focus on the Family President James Daly.

Vaughan's book is not only a history of the Christian Coalition but is the definitive book on the Religious Right in American politics. In classroom use at the university level at Georgetown University and elsewhere, The Rise and Fall of the Christian Coalition gives students an inside look at this organization and its controversial leadership.

== Reception ==
Republican strategist and pollster Kelleyanne Conway praised Vaughan's work: "Joel Vaughan relies on neither gossip nor guesswork in this compelling book. His is an insider's account; ten years at the Christian Coalition and an easy writing style provide the reader with a ringside seat to one of the most controversial—and consequential—periods in modern American political history."

Non-profit watchdog Rusty Leonard added: "In a thorough and entertaining manner, Vaughan's The Rise and Fall of the Christian Coalition captures the essence of the Coalition, its leaders, and the political environment in which the group rose to prominence, as well as how it ultimately dwindled into insignificance. All students of political history and social movements will benefit from Vaughan's fair-minded recounting of this unique period of our history, when Christians were able to mold the political landscape in a manner few would have ever believed possible. And those who witnessed this remarkable organization's dramatic evolution will find Vaughan's 'behind the scenes' insights to be both illuminating and engaging."

Former Christian Coalition press secretary and Virginia anti-abortion organizer Chris Freund gave a strong endorsement: "As someone who knows Joel Vaughan from our days working together at the Christian Coalition, I highly recommend his book. If you want to know the truth of what happened, this book is a must read."

Norfolk's Virginian-Pilot writes that Vaughan's book "is no dewy-eyed paean to the Robertson enterprise. For those interested in a detailed and unvarnished inside view of the coalition's meteoric rise and subsequent implosion, it is a worthwhile read."
