= Poorly Made in China =

Book by Paul Midler

Poorly Made in China: An Insider's Account of the Tactics Behind China's Production Game
- Author: Paul Midler
- Subject: Economics, People's Republic of China
- Publisher: John Wiley & Sons
- Publication date: 2009
- Pages: 241
- ISBN: 9780470405581
- OCLC: 769849101

Poorly Made in China: An Insider's Account of the Tactics Behind China's Production Game is a book by Paul Midler, which chronicles his years spent working with American businessmen whose companies' products are manufactured in China.

== Book content ==
The book was published at a time when young entrepreneurial US citizens were encouraged to move to the People's Republic of China (PRC). The first-person account of a Chinese-speaking Wharton School graduate takes the reader to southern China. The experience of helping Western import businesses find and work with Chinese suppliers is recounted vividly.

== Awards ==
- The Economist Best Book 2009
- Inc. (magazine) Best Book for Business Owners

== International Editions ==
A Chinese edition of the book was launched in Taipei in Feb 2011.
