= The Fat Years =

2009 novel by Chan Koonchung

- Author: Chan Koonchung
- Original title: 盛世 中國 2013年
- Translator: Michael S. Duke
- Language: Chinese
- Genre: Speculative fiction
- Publisher: Transworld Publishers
- Publication date: 2009
- Publication place: Hong Kong
- English publication date: 2011

The Fat Years
- Traditional Chinese: 盛世 中國 2013年
- Simplified Chinese: 盛世 中国 2013年
Transcriptions
Standard Mandarin
- Hanyu Pinyin: Shèngshì Zhōngguó 2013 Nián

The Fat Years is a 2009 Chinese science fiction novel written by Chan Koonchung. First published in traditional Chinese versions in 2009 in both Hong Kong by Oxford University Press and also in Taiwan by the Rye Field Publishing Company under the title 'Prosperous Age: China in the year 2013' (盛世—中國2013年), to date it has never been published in mainland China.

== Plot ==
The novel is set in the near future of 2013, where China has entered a shengshi, a historical epoch of prosperity and peace, while Western nations have stagnated after a second financial crisis in early 2011. Lao Chen, a Hong Kong expatriate and writer living in Beijing, finds himself enjoying the atmosphere of prosperity and contentment. Though suffering from writer's block, he makes a modest living off renting apartments and attends monthly film screenings held at a restaurant owned by his friend Jian Lin (and attended by an insomniac Politburo member named He Dongsheng). Lao gradually finds himself pulled into events by his old friend Fang Caodi, who is frantically searching for the missing month of February 2011 (with official records and public memory jumping from January to March), and his former flame Wei Xihong (known as "Little Xi"), a former public security bureau lawyer who now acts as an Internet activist.

Lao's feelings of contentment begin to vanish as he listens to Wei and Fang's partial recollections of February 2011 and discovers that any available literature about the Cultural Revolution and political issues of the 1980s (including the Tiananmen Square protests of 1989) are either highly sanitized or unavailable. Lao and Fang eventually follow Wei to the township of Warm Springs, where she is helping a house church negotiate with the local government. After Lao confesses his love to Wei, they return to Beijing.

After another film screening at Jian's restaurant, Lao is inadvertently pulled into a kidnapping of He Dongsheng by Fang, Wei, and Zhang Dou (an aspiring guitarist who also recalls February 2011), who are determined to understand the meaning of the missing month. After Dongsheng and the others agree their situation means they will "live or die together" (with Dongsheng's disappearance automatically throwing suspicion onto Lao, but Dongsheng admitting his kidnapping would throw cause suspicion of revealing state secrets), they begin to discuss China's present situation. Dongsheng explains that, with growing challenges to the Communist Party's legitimacy and authority, the decision was made in the midst of the financial crisis to enact his "Action Plan for Ruling the Nation and Pacifying the World." For one week, all government services and forces were forbidden to intervene without express permission, with widespread upheaval and rumor mongering only ending with the reentry of the People's Liberation Army and armed police. The restoration of order and ensuing crackdown helped cement the necessity of the Communist Party in the public mind.

Dongsheng further explains that the Chinese government was able to save their economy with intrusive measures such as the conversion of large percentages of national bank savings accounts to expiring vouchers; large-scale deregulation; strengthening property rights; crackdowns on corruption, counterfeit consumer goods, and "misinformation," and price controls (citing those by Walther Rathenau in World War I Germany and in World War II America). This is coupled with a foreign policy calling for a "Chinese Monroe Doctrine," with East Asia developing under Chinese direction; advocating non-interventionist economic cooperation and political stability in Africa, the Middle East, and Central Asia; and even signing a non-aggression pact with Japan. Backing up these challenges to American hegemony is a new "first use" nuclear weapons policy. Dongsheng even reveals that the general atmosphere of contentment is due to the controlled addition of the drug MDMA into the public's drinking water and bottled drinks and that the missing month of February 2011 is simply a case of social amnesia.

After unsuccessfully arguing with Dongsheng over the benefits of liberal democracy, Fang, Zhang, Wei, and Lao release him and part ways in the early morning.

== Characters ==
- Lao Chen: A writer living in Beijing, born in Hong Kong and a longtime Taiwanese resident. After studying in a Jamaican Catholic university and working in a New York Chinese-language newspaper, he returns to work as a reporter in Hong Kong and Taiwan. He becomes an author of some notability, though he finds himself unable by the time of the novel to make progress on his magnum opus. He makes a modest living off royalties and renting apartments in Beijing and Hong Kong.
- Wei Xihong: Also known as "Little Xi", she is a longtime human rights defender and a former public security bureau lawyer (after having resigned after the harshness of the 1983 Anti-Spiritual Pollution Campaign). She and her mother operated a Beijing restaurant named "The Five Flavors," a hotbed of political and social discussion through the 1980s. In the "Golden Age of Ascendancy", however, she finds herself isolated for her critical opinions of the government.
- Fang Lijun: Also known by his pen name "Fang Caodi", he is a longtime friend of Lao Chan. He was born in 1947 in Beijing and raised in a Taoist temple, his Nationalist father having fled to Taiwan and his Taoist mother dying in prison. After suffering for his family's reputation under the Cultural Revolution, he was allowed to travel to the United States as relations with China thawed. He lived for a time in a New Mexico hippie commune and worked at a Chinese restaurant on the East Coast, before moving to Nigeria and finally moving back to mainland China to travel through the west. He is searching for the missing month of February 2011, which he links to his reliance on asthma medications.
- "Big Sister Song:" The mother of Wei Xihong and proprietor of the current "The Five Flavors" restaurant.
- Wei Guo: The illegitimate son of Wei Xihong. An ambitious law student at Peking University, with ambitions of joining the Central Propaganda Department of the Chinese Communist Party, he is also involved in the para-fascist SS Study Group.
- Jian Lin: A friend of Lao Chen, real estate entrepreneur, and restaurant owner with movie showings
- He Dongsheng: The cousin of Jian Lin and a Politburo member, who is ultimately shown to be behind the "Action Plan for Ruling the Nation and Pacifying the World."
- Zhang Dou: A former child slave laborer and aspiring guitarist. He is also aware of the month of February 2011 and the unusual behavior of people in the "Golden Age of Ascendancy."

== Publication history ==
=== Hong Kong and Taiwan ===
The first editions of the novel were published by Oxford University Press (Hong Kong, 2009) and by the Rye Field Publishing Company [麥田出版] (Taiwan, 2009).

=== Mainland China ===
The book has been banned in mainland China, in a 2012 article on the Huffington Post the author explained that "when my novel, 'The Fat Years,' was published in Chinese in Hong Kong and Taiwan in 2009, some publishers in the mainland China approached me. I told them to read the novel first and then we would talk. None of them came back. Well, one did come back, but for the rights to an earlier novel of mine - a novella about Hong Kong. So officially, 'The Fat Years' was not published in China." In the same article, Koonchung goes on to explain that the book has been written about in the mainland press, and that digital copies were disseminated 'on the Internet within the Chinese firewall' before being deleted. Koonchung does not speculate who specifically deleted his novel, but the title of the article ('Chinese Author: My Book Was Banned in My Home Country') strongly implicates the Chinese authorities.

=== United States and England ===
In July 2011 an English translation by Michael S. Duke was published by Transworld Publishers under the Doubleday imprint of Random House, under the title 'The Fat Years', with a blurb on the cover describing the novel as 'The Notorious Novel No One in China Dares to Publish'. This blurb was later changed to a more direct description 'The Notorious Thriller They Banned In China' in the January 2012 ebook version of the novel by the same publisher. Another ebook version of the novel also published in the same month by the Doubleday imprint Anchor Press uses the a blurb similar to the original, describing it as 'The Book No One in China Dares to Publish', while a print version by the same imprint replaces the blurb with a quote from the New York Times review of the novel.

== Awards and honors ==
- 2013 Jan Michalski Prize for Literature, finalist

== See also ==
- Censorship in China
