= Darak =

- Commune and town
- Interactive map of Darak
- Country: Cameroon
- Time zone: UTC+1 (WAT)

Darak is a town and commune in the Logone-et-Chari department of the Far North Region of Cameroon.

== See also ==
- Communes of Cameroon
