= Bílej kůň, žlutej drak =

2009 novel by Jan Cempírek

Bílej kůň, žlutej drak is a Czech novel, written by Jan Cempírek. It was first published in 2009 and has won the "Cena Knižního Klubu" (Knižní klub Award).

It was written as an autobiography of fictional Vietnamese woman Lan Pham Thi living in the Czech Republic.

== Plot ==
The book begins with the arrival of Julia's cousin Tota, they are attacked by skinheads in Prague, Tota is beaten, rescued by an unknown rescuer, Julie later finds out that it is Michal, a comic book painter who decorated the Vietnamese restaurant "Dragon's Bay", which Julia's father is going to Open the sand. A celebration of the roosters will take place during the celebration of the traditional Vietnamese holiday. Julia's uncle Khiem loses his stall, burned down by skinheads. The opening of the restaurant is not possible without bribing Czech government officials, Tonda (Julia's father) is forced to invite the mayor of Písek to the opening ceremony, who wants to help him achieve better election results. The mayor later gets drunk and Julie notices that the driver of his limousine is the skin that attacked her and Tota. Julie is studying at university after graduation, her cousin Tót becomes a writer (a debutant story about her stay in the Czech Republic). Dragon Bay is closed after two years.
