= Lev Loseff =

American poet

Lev Loseff (Russian: Лев Влади́мирович Ло́сев; birth name Lev Lifshitz; June 15, 1937 – May 6, 2009) was a Russian poet, literary critic, essayist and educator.

== Early life and education ==
The son of poet Vladimir Lifshitz, Loseff was born in Leningrad. He attended Leningrad's famous Saint Peter's School and graduated from the journalism department of the Leningrad State University.

== Literary career ==
Loseff immigrated to the U.S. in 1976. He earned a Ph.D. in Slavic Languages and Literatures from the University of Michigan and became a professor of Russian literature at Dartmouth College in Hanover, New Hampshire, a position he held until his death thirty years later. In his later years Loseff was a Russian-language radio personality and a prolific author, writing both poetry and non-fiction works on Russian literature.

Loseff died on May 6, 2009, in Hanover, NH.

== Works ==
- Joseph Brodsky: A Literary Life
- Joseph Brodsky: The Art of a Poem (co-edited with Valentina Polukhina)
- Iosif Brodskii: Trudy i dni (co-edited with Petr Vail)
- On the Beneficence of Censorship: Aesopian Language in Modern Russian Literature
- Poetika Brodskogo
- Brodsky's Poetics and Aesthetics (co-edited with Valentina Polukhina)
- A Sense of Place: Tsarskoe Selo and Its Poets (co-edited with Barry Scherr)
- Eight collections of poetry and prose in Russian.
