= Deaths in May 2011 =

The following is a list of notable deaths in May 2011.

Entries for each day are listed alphabetically by surname. A typical entry lists information in the following sequence:

- Name, age, country of citizenship at birth, subsequent country of citizenship (if applicable), reason for notability, cause of death (if known), and reference.

== May 2011 ==
=== 1 ===
- Alex, 52, Indian actor and magician, brief illness.
- Spyrydon Babskyi, 52, Ukrainian Orthodox hierarch, Archbishop of Vinnytsia in UOC-KP (1992–1993).
- Schalk Booysen, 83, South African Olympic sprinter.
- Sir Henry Cooper, 76, British Olympic heavyweight boxer.
- Brian Evans, 74, Welsh cricketer (Glamorgan).
- Kim Jun-bong, 58, South Korean taxi driver, suicide by crucifixion.
- Agustín García-Gasco Vicente, 80, Spanish Roman Catholic cardinal, Archbishop of Valencia (1992–2009), cardiac arrest.
- Moshe Landau, 99, Israeli jurist, Chief Justice (1980–1982), presided over Adolf Eichmann's trial (1961).
- Ted Lowe, 90, British snooker commentator.
- Steven Orszag, 68, American mathematician, chronic lymphocytic leukemia.
- Anny Rüegg, 98-99, Swiss alpine skier.
- Ivan Slavkov, 70, Bulgarian sports official.
- William O. Taylor II, 78, American journalist and publisher (The Boston Globe), brain tumor.
- J. Ernest Wilkins Jr., 87, American mathematician and nuclear scientist.

=== 2 ===
- Leonid Abalkin, 80, Russian economist.
- Abu Ahmed al-Kuwaiti, 46, Kuwaiti Al-Qaeda computer expert, shot.
- L.V. Banks, 78, American guitarist, singer and songwriter, heart failure.
- Ion Barbu, 72, Romanian football player.
- Robert W. Clower, 85, American economist.
- Lloyd Colteryahn, 79, American football player (Baltimore Colts).
- Sir Basil Hall, 93, British lawyer and civil servant, Treasury Solicitor (1975–1980).
- Danny Kassap, 28, Congolese-born Canadian long-distance runner.
- Osama bin Laden, 54, Saudi founder of Al-Qaeda, planned September 11 attacks, shot.
- Alexander Lazarev, 73, Russian actor.
- Eddie Lewis, 76, English footballer (Manchester United, West Ham United), cancer.
- Owen Roe McGovern, 93, Irish Gaelic football player.
- Lyuben Obretenov, 92, Bulgarian Olympic gymnast.
- René Emilio Ponce, 64, Salvadoran general and defence minister, army chief of staff during the Civil War.
- David Sencer, 86, American public health official, director of Centers for Disease Control and Prevention (1966–1977), heart disease.
- Shigeo Yaegashi, 78, Japanese footballer.

=== 3 ===
- Paul Ackerley, 61, New Zealand hockey player and coach, skin cancer.
- Frédéric Affo, 68, Beninese politician and football executive.
- Robert Marshall Anderson, 77, American bishop, pancreatic cancer.
- Victor Auer, 74, American Olympic silver medal-winning (1972) sports shooter.
- Bob Balog, 86, American football player (Pittsburgh Steelers).
- Robert Brout, 82, American-born Belgian theoretical physicist.
- Odell Brown, 70, American jazz organist and songwriter ("Sexual Healing").
- Jackie Cooper, 88, American actor (Skippy, Our Gang, Superman).
- C. Rollins Hanlon, 96, American cardiac surgeon, lymphoma.
- Richie Hubbard, 78, Canadian politician.
- Sergo Kotrikadze, 74, Georgian football player and coach, heart attack.
- Abdulla Kurd, 34, Turkish Kurdish Islamist militant.
- Mildred Robbins Leet, 88, American philanthropist, co-founder of Trickle Up, complications of a fall.
- Dale Martin, 59, American politician, member of the West Virginia House of Delegates (2000–2011).
- Larry McCormick, 71, Canadian politician, Member of Parliament for Hastings—Frontenac—Lennox and Addington (1993–2004).
- Marianna Nagy, 82, Hungarian pair skater.
- Patrick Roy, 53, French politician, pancreatic cancer.
- Peter Urbach, 71, German Cold War informant.
- Thanasis Veggos, 83, Greek actor, stroke.
- Armand Van Wambeke, 84, Belgian Olympic basketball player.
- Des Williams, 83, South African Olympic boxer.

=== 4 ===
- James Beggs, 87, American Olympic rower.
- Lázaro Blanco, 73, Mexican photographer, cancer.
- Maurice Carpentier, 89, French cyclist.
- Frans de Kok, 87, Dutch conductor.
- Oliver Elmes, 76, British graphic designer (Doctor Who).
- Jacques Georges Habib Hafouri, 94, Syrian Catholic hierarch, Archbishop of Hassaké-Nisibi (1982–1996).
- Sammy McCrory, 86, Northern Irish footballer.
- Ronald H. Miller, 73, American professor of religion.
- Mary Murphy, 80, American actress (The Wild One).
- Thomas G. Nelson, 74, American federal judge, complications from declining health.
- Françoise Olivier-Coupeau, 51, French politician, cancer.
- Emil Reinecke, 78, German cyclist.
- Acacio Valbuena Rodríguez, 88, Spanish Roman Catholic prelate, Prefect for Western Sahara (1994–2009).
- Frans Sammut, 66, Maltese writer, natural causes.
- Bernard Stasi, 80, French politician, Minister for Overseas Departments and Territories (1973–1974), Alzheimer's disease.
- Richard Steinheimer, 81, American railroad photographer, Alzheimer's disease.
- Sada Thompson, 83, American actress (Family), lung disease.

=== 5 ===
- Leslie Audus, 99, British botany professor (University of London), expert on plant growth hormones.
- Alice Bridges, 94, American Olympic bronze medal-winning (1936) swimmer.
- Nikolay Chuchalov, 78, Soviet Olympic wrestler.
- Claude Choules, 110, British-born Australian veteran, last combat veteran of World War I.
- Donald Crump, 78, Canadian commissioner of the Canadian Football League (1990–1991).
- Salomón Hakim, 81, Colombian neurosurgeon, researcher and inventor.
- Al Johnson, 88, American football player and coach.
- Arthur Laurents, 93, American playwright, librettist, stage director, and screenwriter (Anastasia, Rope, West Side Story).
- Dougie McCracken, 46, Scottish football player (Ayr United), suspected suicide.
- Yosef Merimovich, 86, Israeli football player and manager.
- Rolo Puente, 71, Argentine actor, pulmonary emphysema.
- Friedrich Rückert, 90, Austrian Olympic hockey player.
- Tommy Wright, 83, Scottish footballer.
- Dana Wynter, 79, German-born British actress (Invasion of the Body Snatchers, Airport, The Man Who Never Was), heart failure.

=== 6 ===
- Barry Connolly, 72, Australian football player.
- Oniroku Dan, 80, Japanese author, esophageal cancer.
- Sir Geoffrey Dhenin, 93, British air marshal.
- Bill Hopkins, 83, Welsh writer.
- Horace Freeland Judson, 80, American science historian (The Great Betrayal: Fraud In Science), complications of a stroke.
- Antanas Krištopaitis, 89, Lithuanian painter.
- Kazi Nuruzzaman, 86, Bangladeshi veteran of the Liberation War, natural causes.
- Duane Pillette, 88, American baseball player (New York Yankees, Philadelphia Phillies).
- Dick Walsh, 85, American baseball executive, first commissioner of the North American Soccer League.
- Yoon Ki-won, 24, South Korean football player, suicide by carbon monoxide poisoning.

=== 7 ===
- Johnny Albino, 93, Puerto Rican bolero singer, heart attack.
- Seve Ballesteros, 54, Spanish golfer, brain cancer.
- Big George, 53, British broadcaster and music arranger.
- Willard Boyle, 86, Canadian physicist, Nobel laureate (2009).
- Shaukat Galiev, 82, Soviet Tatar poet and writer of children's books.
- Jack Gordon, 66, American politician, member of the Mississippi House of Representatives (1972–1980), State Senator (1980–1992; 1996–2011), brain cancer.
- Ross Hagen, 72, American actor (Daktari, Speedway).
- Allyson Hennessy, 63, Trinidadian broadcaster.
- Eilert Määttä, 75, Swedish ice hockey player and coach.
- Milan Mišík, 82, Slovak geologist.
- Gunter Sachs, 78, German photographer, author and multi-millionaire industrialist, suicide by gunshot.
- Robert Stempel, 77, American automobile executive, chairman and CEO of General Motors (1990–1992).
- Kate Swift, 87, American writer, stomach cancer.
- John Walker, 67, American musician (The Walker Brothers), liver cancer.
- Doric Wilson, 72, American playwright and gay activist.

=== 8 ===
- Huthaifa al-Batawi, Iraqi al-Qaeda leader, shot.
- Wallace Clark, 84, Northern Irish maritime writer.
- Cornell Dupree, 68, American jazz and R&B guitarist, complications from emphysema.
- George Guțiu, 87, Romanian Catholic hierarch, Archbishop of Cluj-Gherla (1994–2002).
- Corwin Hansch, 92, American chemist, pneumonia.
- Li Desheng, 95, Chinese People's Liberation Army general.
- Charles McPhee, 49, American radio host, amyotrophic lateral sclerosis.
- Greg Percival, 86, Australian politician, member of the New South Wales Legislative Council (1977–1978; 1986–1988).
- Soňa Pertlová, 23, Czech chessplayer, cancer.
- Lionel Rose, 62, Australian world champion boxer.
- Hilton Rosemarin, 58, Canadian set decorator (Three Men and a Baby, Cocktail, Jumper), brain cancer.
- Carlos Trillo, 68, Argentine comic book writer (Cybersix).
- Galina Urbanovich, 93, Russian Olympic gold and silver medal-winning (1952) gymnast.
- Arkady Vaksberg, 83, Soviet and Russian lawyer, author, film maker and playwright.
- Sir Ronald Waterhouse, 85, British jurist.

=== 9 ===
- George Allen, 87, American ichthyologist and fisheries scientist.
- William Y. Anderson, 89, Swedish-born American fighter pilot.
- David Cairns, 44, British politician, MP for Greenock and Inverclyde (2001–2005) and Inverclyde (since 2005), acute pancreatitis.
- Robert Ellsworth, 84, American politician and diplomat, Representative from Kansas (1961–1967), Ambassador to NATO (1969–1971), complications from pneumonia.
- Epiphanios of Vryoula, 76, American Greek Orthodox Archbishop of Spain and Portugal.
- Henry Feffer, 93, American professor and spine surgeon, treated Saddam Hussein, heart failure.
- Dolores Fuller, 88, American actress (Glen or Glenda), and songwriter ("Rock-A-Hula Baby").
- Jeff Gralnick, 72, American television news producer.
- Lidia Gueiler Tejada, 89, Bolivian politician, acting President (1979–1980), after a long illness.
- Wadel Abdelkader Kamougué, 71–72, Chadian politician and military officer, Vice President of Chad (1979–1982), President of the National Assembly of Chad (1997–2002).
- Doug Leeds, 63, American executive, vice-chairman of American Theatre Wing, cancer.
- Ivo Pešák, 66, Czech singer, dancer and comic performer.
- Roland Spångberg, 88, Swedish Olympic water polo player.
- Newton Thornburg, 81, American novelist.
- Shailendra Kumar Upadhyay, 82, Nepali politician, Foreign Minister (1986–1990), altitude sickness.
- Wouter Weylandt, 26, Belgian road bicycle racer, race crash.

=== 10 ===
- Omar Ahmad, 46, American entrepreneur (Napster) and politician, Mayor of San Carlos, California (2010–2011), heart attack.
- Michael Baze, 24, American jockey, accidental drug overdose.
- Bill Bergesch, 89, American baseball executive (Kansas City Athletics, New York Yankees, Cincinnati Reds).
- Frank Boston, 72, American politician, member of the Maryland House of Delegates (1987–1999).
- John S. Carter, 65, American music producer, cancer.
- Bill Gallo, 88, American cartoonist and newspaper columnist, complications from pneumonia.
- Patrick Galvin, 83, Irish writer.
- Zim Ngqawana, 51, South African jazz saxophonist, stroke.
- Burt Reinhardt, 91, American broadcast executive, President of CNN (1982–1990), complications from strokes.
- David Weston, 75, British artist.
- Norma Zimmer, 87, American entertainer (The Lawrence Welk Show).

=== 11 ===
- Clark Accord, 50, Surinamese–Dutch author and makeup artist, stomach cancer.
- Maurice Goldhaber, 100, American physicist.
- Leo Kahn, 94, American entrepreneur, co-founder of Staples, complications from a series of strokes.
- Albert Obiefuna, 81, Nigerian Roman Catholic prelate, Archbishop of Onitsha (1995–2003).
- Leo Passage, 75, Dutch-born American hairstylist.
- Reach Sambath, 47, Cambodian journalist, stroke.
- Elisabeth Svendsen, 81, British hotelier and animal welfare campaigner, founder of The Donkey Sanctuary.
- Robert Traylor, 34, American basketball player (Milwaukee Bucks, Cleveland Cavaliers, New Orleans Hornets), suspected heart attack.
- Glyn Williams, 92, Welsh footballer.
- Snooky Young, 92, American jazz trumpeter, complications of a lung ailment.

=== 12 ===
- Chen Muhua, 90, Chinese politician.
- Harrison Chongo, 41, Zambian football player, malaria.
- Matej Čurko, 42–43, Slovak murderer, cannibal and suspected serial killer, complications from gunshot wounds.
- Charles F. Haas, 97, American television director (Bonanza, The Outer Limits, The Man from U.N.C.L.E.).
- Mose Jefferson, 68, American businessman, cancer.
- Jack Jones, 86, American Pulitzer Prize-winning reporter (Los Angeles Times), lung disease.
- Lloyd Knibb, 80, Jamaican drummer (The Skatalites), liver cancer.
- Noreen Murray, 76, British geneticist.
- David Orton, 77, Canadian environmentalist, pancreatic cancer.
- Carlos Pascual, 80, Cuban baseball player (Washington Senators).
- Luigi del Gallo Roccagiovine, 88, Italian nobleman and Roman Catholic prelate, Titular Bishop of Camplum (since 1982).
- Ron Springs, 54, American football player (Dallas Cowboys, Tampa Bay Buccaneers), complications from surgery.
- Bill Summers, 75, American car builder (Goldenrod).
- Miyu Uehara, 24, Japanese glamour model, apparent suicide by hanging.
- Jack Wolf, 76, American information theorist, cancer.

=== 13 ===
- Derek Boogaard, 28, Canadian hockey player (Minnesota Wild, New York Rangers), accidental overdose of alcohol and oxycodone.
- Stephen De Staebler, 78, American sculptor and printmaker, complications from cancer.
- Chit Estella, 53, Filipino journalist and professor, traffic collision.
- Pam Gems, 85, British playwright.
- Bernard Greenhouse, 95, American cellist.
- Bob Litherland, 80, British politician, MP for Manchester Central (1979–1997), cancer.
- Princess Maria Elisabeth of Bavaria, 96, German noblewoman.
- Wallace McCain, 81, Canadian businessman, co-founder of McCain Foods, pancreatic cancer.
- Mel Queen, 69, American baseball player (Cincinnati Reds, Los Angeles Angels of Anaheim) and pitching coach (Blue Jays).
- Jack Richardson, 81, Canadian record producer (The Guess Who).
- Bruce Ricker, 68, American film documentarian and producer (Thelonious Monk: Straight, No Chaser).
- Badal Sarkar, 85, Indian dramatist, colon cancer.

=== 14 ===
- Ferial Alibali, 78, Albanian actress.
- James Richard Cheek, 74, American diplomat, Ambassador to Sudan (1989–1992) and Argentina (1993–1996).
- Murray Handwerker, 89, American businessman (Nathan's Famous).
- Teuvo Laukkanen, 91, Finnish Olympic silver medal-winning (1948) cross-country skier.
- Michael Onslow, 7th Earl of Onslow, 73, British politician.
- Nicholas V. Riasanovsky, 87, Chinese-born American historian and author.
- Birgitta Trotzig, 81, Swedish author.
- Ernie Walker, 82, Scottish football administrator.
- Joseph Wershba, 90, American television producer and reporter.

=== 15 ===
- Gunnar Alksnis, 79, Latvian-American philosopher and theologian.
- Maico Buncio, 22, Filipino motorcycle racer, race crash.
- Donald Christian, 52, Antiguan Olympic cyclist.
- John Feikens, 93, American senior (former chief) judge of the District Court for the Eastern District of Michigan, after long illness.
- Bob Flanigan, 84, American singer (The Four Freshmen) and musician.
- Pete Lovely, 85, American racecar driver.
- William Pennington, 88, American casino executive (Circus Circus Enterprises), Parkinson's disease.
- Anjuman Shehzadi, 33, Pakistani sage actress.
- Mahendra Singh Tikait, 76, Indian farming union leader, bone cancer.
- Samuel Wanjiru, 24, Kenyan Olympic gold medal-winning (2008) marathon runner, fall from balcony.
- Martin Woodhouse, 78, British novelist, screenwriter and inventor.

=== 16 ===
- Ralph Barker, 93, British air gunner and writer.
- Robert Berks, 89, American sculptor, industrial designer and planner.
- Douglas Blubaugh, 76, American Olympic gold medal-winning (1960) wrestler, motorcycle accident.
- Serghei Covaliov, 66, Romanian Olympic gold (1968) and silver (1972) medal-winning canoeist.
- Bob Davis, 82, Australian football player.
- Nathaniel Davis, 86, American diplomat, cancer.
- Edward Hardwicke, 78, British actor (Sherlock Holmes).
- Kiyoshi Kodama, 77, Japanese actor, stomach cancer.
- Bill Skiles, 79, American comedian (Skiles and Henderson), kidney cancer.

=== 17 ===
- Sean Dunphy, 73, Irish entertainer.
- Joseph Galibardy, 96, Indian Olympic gold medal-winning (1936) field hockey player.
- James M. Hewgley Jr., 94, American politician, Mayor of Tulsa, Oklahoma (1966–1970).
- Harmon Killebrew, 74, American Hall of Fame baseball player (Minnesota Twins, Kansas City Royals), esophageal cancer.
- Tomás Mac Anna, 84, Irish director and actor.
- Frank Upton, 76, English footballer (Derby County, Chelsea), after short illness.

=== 18 ===
- Seiseki Abe, 96, Japanese shodo and aikido teacher.
- Marcel De Mulder, 83, Belgian cyclist.
- Edward H. Harte, 88, American newspaper executive (Harte-Hanks).
- Leonard Kastle, 82, American composer and filmmaker (The Honeymoon Killers).
- Wlodzimierz Ksiazek, 60, Polish-born American painter. (body found on this date)
- Włada Majewska, 100, Polish radio journalist, actress and singer.
- Hans Sterr, 77, German Olympic wrestler.
- Antoinette Tubman, 97, Liberian socialite, First Lady (1948–1971).
- Dick Wimmer, 74, American author, heart complications.

=== 19 ===
- Phyllis Avery, 88, American actress, heart failure.
- Don H. Barden, 67, American businessman, lung cancer.
- Garret FitzGerald, 85, Irish politician, Taoiseach (1981–1982, 1982–1987), Minister for Foreign Affairs (1973–1977), pneumonia.
- Ivan Gibbs, 83, Australian politician, Queensland MLA for Albert (1974–1989), cancer.
- Jeffrey Catherine Jones, 67, American transgender artist.
- David H. Kelley, 87, American-born Canadian archaeologist.
- Kathy Kirby, 72, British singer, heart attack.
- William Kloefkorn, 78, American poet.
- Alda Noni, 95, Italian coloratura soprano.
- Vladimir Ryzhkin, 80, Russian Olympic gold medal-winning (1956) footballer.
- Tom West, 71, American computer hardware engineer, heart attack.

=== 20 ===
- Michael Bell, 74, Irish politician, Teachta Dála for Louth (1982–2002).
- John Cigna, 75, American radio personality (KDKA).
- William Elliott, Baron Elliott of Morpeth, 90, British politician, MP for Newcastle upon Tyne North (1957–1983).
- Arieh Handler, 95, Israeli Zionist leader.
- Eduard Janota, 59, Czech politician, Finance Minister (2009–2010), cardiac arrest.
- Donald Krim, 65, American businessman, president of Kino International, cancer.
- Ciril Pelhan, 89, Yugoslav Olympic swimmer.
- Joaquín Pérez, 75, Mexican Olympic double bronze medal-winning (1980) equestrian.
- Steve Rutt, 66, American inventor of early video animation, pancreatic cancer.
- Randy Savage, 58, American professional wrestler (WWF, WCW) and actor (Spider-Man), heart attack.

=== 21 ===
- Cecilia Miranda de Carvalho, 97, Brazilian singer.
- John Delaney, 42, Irish businessman (Intrade).
- Irene Gilbert, 76, American actress and school director, co-founder of Stella Adler Academy of Los Angeles, Alzheimer's disease.
- David J. Hudson, 67, American sound mixer (Beauty and the Beast, The Terminator, The Lion King).
- Bill Hunter, 71, Australian actor (Muriel's Wedding), liver cancer.
- Pádraig Kennelly, 82, Irish website, editor and journalist, founder of Kerry's Eye.
- Dieter Klöcker, 75, German clarinetist.
- Gordon McLennan, 87, British politician, General Secretary of the Communist Party (1975–1990), cancer.
- Hiroyuki Nagato, 77, Japanese actor, cerebrovascular disease.
- Jim Pyburn, 78, American baseball player (Baltimore Orioles), after long illness.
- Bill Rechin, 80, American cartoonist (Crock), complications from esophageal cancer.
- William White, 98, British sports shooter.

=== 22 ===
- Stanislav Batishchev, 70, Soviet Ukrainian weightlifter.
- Joseph Brooks, 73, American Grammy-winning songwriter ("You Light Up My Life"), suicide by asphyxiation.
- Joëlle Brupbacher, 32, Swiss mountaineer, acute mountain sickness.
- Chidananda Dasgupta, 89, Indian film critic.
- Bill Eaton, 79, Australian politician, member of the Queensland Legislative Assembly for Mourilyan (1980–1994).
- Alexandru Ene, 82, Romanian football player.
- Matej Ferjan, 34, Slovenian motorcycle speedway rider.
- Bob Gould, 74, Australian activist and bookseller.
- Ralph Hunt, 83, Australian politician, MP for Gwydir (1969–1989).
- Suzanne Mizzi, 43, British glamour model and interior designer, cancer.
- Ronald Naar, 56, Dutch mountaineer.
- Breon O'Casey, 83, British artist.
- Govind Chandra Pande, 87, Indian historian.
- Walter Soboleff, 102, American Tlingit scholar and spiritual leader, first Native Alaskan Prebysterian minister, bone and prostate cancer.
- Joe Steffy, 85, American college football player (Army), 1947 Outland Trophy winner.
- George Henry Strohsahl, Jr., 73, American naval officer and former commander of the Pacific Missile Test Center.

=== 23 ===
- Sam Faust, 26, Australian rugby league player, leukemia.
- Michele Fawdon, 63, British-born Australian actress (Cathy's Child), cancer.
- Peter Frelinghuysen Jr., 95, American politician, U.S. Representative from New Jersey (1953–1975).
- Nasser Hejazi, 61, Iranian football player and manager, cancer.
- Pilu Momtaz, 52, Bangladeshi pop singer.
- Abdias do Nascimento, 97, Brazilian activist and politician.
- Joseph Nguyễn Tích Đức, 73, Vietnamese Roman Catholic prelate, Bishop of Ban Me Thuot (2000–2006).
- Karel Otčenášek, 91, Czech Roman Catholic prelate, Bishop of Hradec Králové (1989–1998).
- Frank S. Petersen, 88, American jurist and politician.
- Harry Redmond Jr., 101, American special effects artist and producer (King Kong), natural causes.
- Alejandro Roces, 86, Filipino writer and government official, Secretary of Education (1961–1965).
- Roberto Sosa, 81, Honduran poet, heart attack.
- John Templeton-Cotill, 90, British admiral.
- Xavier Tondo, 32, Spanish cyclist, crushed by car.

=== 24 ===
- Huguette Clark, 104, American heiress.
- José Cláudio da Silva, 54, Brazilian Amazon environmentalist and conservationist, shot.
- Arthur Goldreich, 82, South African-born Israeli political activist.
- Mark Haines, 65, American television anchor (CNBC).
- Glyn Hughes, 75, English poet, novelist and artist, cancer.
- Imre Nagy, 70, Canadian Olympic fencer.
- Fănuș Neagu, 79, Romanian novelist, journalist, and short story writer.
- Edward Plunkett, 20th Baron of Dunsany, 71, Irish artist.
- Barry Potomski, 38, Canadian ice hockey player (Los Angeles Kings).
- Sir Blair Stewart-Wilson, 81, British courtier.
- Paul Winslow, 82, South African cricketer.
- Stephen K. Yamashiro, 69, American politician, Mayor of Hawaii County (1992–2000), pneumonia.
- Hakim Ali Zardari, 81, Pakistani politician, father of Asif Ali Zardari, after long illness.

=== 25 ===
- Lillian Adams, 89, American actress (Private Benjamin, The Suite Life on Deck, Bruce Almighty).
- Maurice E. Baringer, 89, American educator and politician.
- Nina Leopold Bradley, 93, American conservationist.
- Leonora Carrington, 94, British-born Mexican painter and novelist.
- Luigi Diligenza, 90, Italian Roman Catholic prelate, Archbishop of Capua (1978–1997).
- Roger Gautier, 88, French Olympic silver medal-winning (1952) rower.
- Edwin Honig, 91, American poet and translator, Alzheimer's disease.
- Terry Jenner, 66, Australian Test cricketer and coach.
- Miroslav Opsenica, 29, Serbian footballer, car accident.
- Gene Smith, 94, American baseball player (Negro leagues).
- Paul Splittorff, 64, American baseball player and broadcaster (Kansas City Royals), complications from melanoma.
- Dimitrios Taliadoros, 85-86, Greek Olympic basketball player.
- Yannis Varveris, 56, Greek poet, critic and translator, cardiac arrest.
- Paul J. Wiedorfer, 90, American soldier, Medal of Honor recipient.
- Edward Żentara, 55, Polish actor.

=== 26 ===
- Arisen Ahubudu, 91, Sri Lankan scholar, author and playwright.
- Flick Colby, 65, American dancer and choreographer (Pan's People), bronchial pneumonia.
- George Heron, 92, American tribal leader, President of the Seneca Nation of New York (1958–1960; 1962–1964).
- Irwin D. Mandel, 89, American dental scientist in preventative dentistry.
- Peter McKechnie, 70, Australian politician, member of the Queensland Legislative Assembly for Carnarvon (1974–1989).
- Tyler Simpson, 25, Australian soccer player.

=== 27 ===
- Sam Alexander, 28, British Royal Marine, shot.
- María Rosa Alonso, 104, Spanish professor, philologist and essayist.
- Edward a'Beckett, 71, Australian cricketer.
- Armando Bandini, 84, Italian actor and voice actor.
- John W. Bowen, 84, American politician, Member of the Ohio Senate.
- Johnny Brewer, 74, American football player (Cleveland Browns, New Orleans Saints).
- Janet Brown, 87, British actress and impersonator, after short illness.
- Jeff Conaway, 60, American actor (Grease, Taxi, Babylon 5).
- Margo Dydek, 37, Polish basketball player (Utah Starzz, Los Angeles Sparks) and coach, heart attack.
- Johanna Fiedler, 65, American author, daughter of Arthur Fiedler.
- Regalado Maambong, 72, Filipino jurist, member of 1986 Constitutional Commission.
- Prince Ali Mirza Qajar, 81, Iranian royal, Head of the Qajar Imperial Family (since 1988), after long illness.
- Joaquín Moya, 79, Spanish Olympic fencer.
- Gil Scott-Heron, 62, American poet ("The Revolution Will Not Be Televised"), musician and author.
- Jukka Toivola, 61, Finnish Olympic athlete, amyotrophic lateral sclerosis.
- Michael Willoughby, 12th Baron Middleton, 90, British aristocrat and politician.

=== 28 ===
- Hermann Bley, 75, German footballer.
- Mohammed Daud Daud, 42, Afghan general, police commander for northern Afghanistan, bombing.
- Bill Harris, 79, Canadian baseball player (Brooklyn/Los Angeles Dodgers).
- Romuald Klim, 78, Belarusian hammer thrower, Olympic gold medalist (1964).
- Ann McPherson, 65, British physician and public health campaigner.
- Dame Barbara Mills, 70, British barrister, Director of Public Prosecutions (1992–1998), stroke.
- Leo Rangell, 97, American psychoanalyst, complications from surgery.
- Alys Robi, 88, Canadian singer.
- Martha Rommelaere, 88, Canadian baseball player (All-American Girls Professional Baseball League).
- John H. Sinfelt, 80, American chemical engineer in unleaded gasoline, congestive heart failure.

=== 29 ===
- Sergei Bagapsh, 62, Abkhazian politician, President (since 2005), complications after surgery.
- Jon Blake, 52, Australian actor, pneumonia.
- Simon Brint, 60, British musician, suicide.
- Bill Clements, 94, American politician, Governor of Texas (1979–1983; 1987–1991).
- Billy Crook, 84, English footballer (Wolverhampton Wanderers).
- Wally Jay, 93, American martial arts teacher, founder of Small Circle JuJitsu, after long illness.
- Ferenc Mádl, 80, Hungarian politician, President of the Republic (2000–2005).
- Vitaly Margulis, 83, Russian classical pianist.
- Tom Roeser, 82, American political commentator.
- Bill Roycroft, 96, Australian equestrian, five-time Olympian, gold medallist (1960).
- Cosmo Francesco Ruppi, 78, Italian Roman Catholic prelate, Bishop of Termoli-Larino (1980–1988) and Archbishop of Lecce (1988–2009).

=== 30 ===
- Bill Benulis, 82, American cartoonist.
- Ricky Bruch, 64, Swedish athlete, cancer.
- Henri Chammartin, 92, Swiss dressage equestrian, multiple Olympic medallist.
- Paul B. Ferrara, 68, American scientist and administrator, pioneer of genetic fingerprinting, brain tumor.
- Jung Jong-kwan, 29, South Korean footballer, suspected suicide by hanging.
- Sudhakar Kulkarni, 73, Indian cricket umpire.
- Eddie Morrison, 63, Scottish footballer and manager (Kilmarnock).
- Hans Nogler, 91, Austrian Olympic alpine skier.
- Isikia Savua, 59, Fijian diplomat and police commissioner.
- Marek Siemek, 68, Polish philosopher and historian of philosophy.
- Clarice Taylor, 93, American actress (Sesame Street, The Cosby Show).
- Giorgio Tozzi, 88, American operatic bass, heart attack.
- Tillmann Uhrmacher, 44, German DJ, music producer and radio host.
- Rosalyn Sussman Yalow, 89, American medical physicist, Nobel laureate.

=== 31 ===
- Gilberto Aleman, 80, Spanish author and journalist.
- Pauline Betz, 91, American tennis player.
- Jonas Bevacqua, 33, American fashion designer (Lifted Research Group).
- Conrado Estrella Sr., 93, Filipino politician, Governor of Pangasinan (1954–1963), Agrarian Reform Minister (1978–1986).
- Derek Hodge, 69, U.S. Virgin Islander politician and attorney, Lieutenant Governor of the United States Virgin Islands (1987–1995), cancer.
- Keith Irvine, 82, British-born American interior designer, cardiac arrest.
- Hans Keilson, 101, German-born Dutch psychoanalyst and novelist.
- John N. Leedom, 89, American politician.
- Sir John Martin, 93, British admiral, Lieutenant Governor of Guernsey (1974–1980).
- Adolfas Mekas, 85, Lithuanian-born American film director.
- Andy Robustelli, 85, American Hall of Fame football player (Los Angeles Rams, New York Giants).
- Philip Rose, 89, American theatrical producer, stroke.
- Ezzatollah Sahabi, 81, Iranian politician, Member of Parliament (1980–1984), stroke.
- Saleem Shahzad, 40, Pakistani journalist, shot. (body found on this date)
- Hugh Stewart, 100, British film editor and producer.
- Grant Sullivan, 86, American actor (Pony Express), cancer.
- Ram Man Trishit, 70, Nepali lyricist, kidney problems.
- Sølvi Wang, 81, Norwegian singer and actress.
- Jennifer Worth, 75, British author, esophageal cancer.
