= April 17 =

April 17 this year in various calendars
- Friday, 17 April 2026
Other calendars
| Armenian | 1 Mareri 1475 |
| Aztec | Tlaxochimaco 17, 7 Cōātl |
| Babylonian | 28 Adaru, 2336 SE |
| Balinese pawukon | Menga, Pasah, Sri, Wage, Tungleh, Sukra of Landep, Ludra, Dangu, Pandita |
| Bengali | 7 Bhadro, BS 1433 |
| Chinese | Yin Metal Rooster・Bond Mansion -117 Qīyuè, Bǐngwǔnián (Qingming, 3 days until Guyu) |
| Common Era | 17 April 2026 CE |
| Coptic | 9 Parmouti, AM 1742 |
| Egyptian | 1 Thoth, 2775 NE |
| Ethiopian | 9 Miyāzyā, 2018 Amätä Məhrät |
| French Republican | Décade III, Octidi de Germinal de l'Année 234 de la République |
| Gregorian | 17 April, AD 2026 |
| Hebrew | 30 Nisan, AM 5786; Omer 15 |
| Icelandic | Föstudagur, 25 Einmánuður 2025 |
| Islamic | 29 Shawwal, AH 1447 (using tabular method) |
| ISO week date | 2026-W16-5 |
| Japanese | 1 Yayoi, Reiwa 8 (Seimei, 3 days until Kokuu) |
| Julian | 4 April, AD 2026 (AM 7534) |
| Julian day | 2461148 |
| Maya | 13.0.13.9.5; 18 Pop, 7 Chicchan |
| Roman | Pridie Nonas Apriles, MMDCCLXXIX AUC |
| Solar Hijri | 28 Farvardin, SH 1405 |

| << | April | | | | | >> |
| Su | Mo | Tu | We | Th | Fr | Sa |
| | | | 1 | 2 | 3 | 4 |
| 5 | 6 | 7 | 8 | 9 | 10 | 11 |
| 12 | 13 | 14 | 15 | 16 | 17 | 18 |
| 19 | 20 | 21 | 22 | 23 | 24 | 25 |
| 26 | 27 | 28 | 29 | 30 |
2026

April 17 in recent years
2026 (Friday)
2025 (Thursday)
2024 (Wednesday)
2023 (Monday)
2022 (Sunday)
2021 (Saturday)
2020 (Friday)
2019 (Wednesday)
2018 (Tuesday)
2017 (Monday)

April 17 is the 107th day of the year (108th in leap years) in the Gregorian calendar; 258 days remain until the end of the year.

== Events ==
=== Pre-1600 ===
- 1080 – Harald III of Denmark dies and is succeeded by Canute IV, who would later be the first Dane to be canonized.
- 1349 – The rule of the Bavand dynasty in Mazandaran is brought to an end by the murder of Hasan II.
- 1362 – Kaunas Castle falls to the Teutonic Order after a month-long siege.
- 1492 – Spain and Christopher Columbus sign the Capitulations of Santa Fe for his voyage to Asia to acquire spices.
- 1521 – Trial of Martin Luther over his teachings begins during the assembly of the Diet of Worms. Initially intimidated, he asks for time to reflect before answering and is given a stay of one day.
- 1524 – Giovanni da Verrazzano reaches New York harbor.

=== 1601–1900 ===
- 1783 – American Revolutionary War: Colbert's Raid: A Spanish garrison under Captain Jacobo du Breuil defeat British irregulars at Arkansas Post.
- 1797 – Sir Ralph Abercromby attacks San Juan, Puerto Rico, in what would be one of the largest invasions of the Spanish territories in the Americas.
- 1797 – Citizens of Verona begin an unsuccessful eight-day rebellion against the French occupying forces.
- 1861 – The state of Virginia's secession convention votes to secede from the United States; Virginia later becomes the eighth state to join the Confederate States of America.
- 1863 – American Civil War: Grierson's Raid begins: Troops under Union Army Colonel Benjamin Grierson attack central Mississippi.
- 1864 – American Civil War: The Battle of Plymouth begins: Confederate forces attack Plymouth, North Carolina.
- 1869 – Morelos is admitted as the 27th state of Mexico.
- 1876 – Catalpa rescue: The rescue of six Fenian prisoners from Fremantle Prison in Western Australia.
- 1895 – The Treaty of Shimonoseki between China and Japan is signed. This marks the end of the First Sino-Japanese War, and the defeated Qing Empire is forced to renounce its claims on Korea and to concede the southern portion of the Fengtian province, Taiwan and the Penghu to Japan.

=== 1901–present ===
- 1905 – The Supreme Court of the United States decides Lochner v. New York, which holds that the "right to free contract" is implicit in the due process clause of the Fourteenth Amendment to the United States Constitution.
- 1907 – The Ellis Island immigration center processes 11,747 people, more than on any other day.
- 1912 – Russian troops open fire on striking goldfield workers in northeast Siberia, killing at least 150.
- 1925 – The Communist Party of Korea (CPK) was founded in Japanese-ruled Korea (Chōsen) in Keijō (now Seoul) by Kim Yong-bom and Pak Hon-yong.
- 1931 – After negotiations between Catalan and Spanish provisional governments, the Catalan Republic proclaimed in April 14 becomes the Generalitat de Catalunya, the autonomous government of Catalonia within the Spanish Republic.
- 1941 – World War II: The Axis powers invasion of Yugoslavia is completed when it signs an armistice with Germany and Italy.
- 1942 – World War II: French prisoner of war General Henri Giraud escapes from his castle prison in Königstein Fortress.
- 1944 – Forces of the Communist-controlled Greek People's Liberation Army attack the smaller National and Social Liberation resistance group, which surrenders. Its leader Dimitrios Psarros is murdered.
- 1945 – World War II: Montese, Italy, is liberated from Nazi forces.
- 1945 – Historian Tran Trong Kim is appointed the Prime Minister of the Empire of Vietnam.
- 1946 – The last French troops are withdrawn from Syria.
- 1951 – The Peak District becomes the United Kingdom's first National Park.
- 1961 – Bay of Pigs Invasion: A group of Cuban exiles financed and trained by the CIA lands at the Bay of Pigs in Cuba with the aim of ousting Fidel Castro.
- 1964 – Jerrie Mock completes the first around-the-world airplane flight by a woman. Her solo flight in the Spirit of Columbus, which took 29 1/2 days, took off and landed at the Port Columbus International Airport in Ohio.
- 1969 – Sirhan Sirhan is convicted of assassinating Robert F. Kennedy.
- 1969 – Communist Party of Czechoslovakia chairman Alexander Dubček is deposed.
- 1970 – Apollo program: The damaged Apollo 13 spacecraft returns to Earth safely.
- 1971 – The Provisional Government of Bangladesh is formed.
- 1975 – The Cambodian Civil War ends and the Cambodian Genocide begins. The Khmer Rouge captures the capital Phnom Penh and Cambodian government forces surrender.
- 1978 – Mir Akbar Khyber is assassinated, provoking the Saur Revolution in Afghanistan.
- 1982 – Constitution Act, 1982 Patriation of the Canadian constitution in Ottawa by Proclamation of Elizabeth II, Queen of Canada.
- 1986 – An alleged state of war lasting 335 years between the Netherlands and the Isles of Scilly is declared over.
- 1992 – The Katina P is deliberately run aground off Maputo, Mozambique, and 60,000 tons of crude oil spill into the ocean.
- 1998 – Space Shuttle Columbia is launched on STS-90, the final Spacelab mission.
- 2003 – Anneli Jäätteenmäki takes office as the first female prime minister of Finland.
- 2006 – A Palestinian suicide bomber detonates an explosive device in a Tel Aviv restaurant, killing 11 people and injuring 70.
- 2013 – An explosion at a fertilizer plant in the city of West, Texas, kills 15 people and injures 160 others.
- 2013 – The ceremonial funeral of former British prime minister Margaret Thatcher takes place at St Paul's Cathedral.
- 2014 – NASA's Kepler space telescope confirms the discovery of the first Earth-size planet in the habitable zone of another star.
- 2021 – The funeral of Prince Philip, Duke of Edinburgh, takes place at St George's Chapel, Windsor Castle.

== Births ==
=== Pre-1600 ===
- 1277 – Michael IX Palaiologos, Byzantine emperor (died 1320)
- 1455 – Andrea Gritti, Doge of Venice (died 1538)
- 1497 – Pedro de Valdivia, Spanish conquistador, conquered northern Chile (died 1553)
- 1573 – Maximilian I, Elector of Bavaria (died 1651)
- 1586 – John Ford, English poet and playwright (died 1639)
- 1598 – Giovanni Battista Riccioli, Italian priest and astronomer (died 1671)

=== 1601–1900 ===
- 1620 – Marguerite Bourgeoys, French-Canadian nun and saint, founded the Congregation of Notre Dame of Montreal (died 1700)
- 1635 – Edward Stillingfleet, British theologian and scholar (died 1699)
- 1683 – Johann David Heinichen, German composer and theorist (died 1729)
- 1710 – Henry Erskine, 10th Earl of Buchan, Scottish politician (died 1767)
- 1734 – Taksin, King of Thailand (died 1782)
- 1741 – Samuel Chase, American lawyer and jurist (died 1811)
- 1750 – François de Neufchâteau, French academic and politician, French Minister of the Interior (died 1828)
- 1756 – Dheeran Chinnamalai, Indian commander (died 1805)
- 1766 – Collin McKinney, American surveyor, merchant, and politician (died 1861)
- 1794 – Carl Friedrich Philipp von Martius, German botanist and explorer (died 1868)
- 1798 – Étienne Bobillier, French mathematician and academic (died 1840)
- 1799 – Eliza Acton, English food writer and poet (died 1859)
- 1814 – Josif Pančić, Serbian botanist and academic (died 1888)
- 1816 – Thomas Hazlehurst, English architect and philanthropist (died 1876)
- 1820 – Alexander Cartwright, American firefighter and (disputed) inventor of baseball (died 1892)
- 1833 – Jean-Baptiste Accolay, Belgian violinist, composer, and conductor (died 1900)
- 1837 – J. P. Morgan, American banker and financier, founded J.P. Morgan & Co. (died 1913)
- 1842 – Maurice Rouvier, French businessman and politician, 53rd Prime Minister of France (died 1911)
- 1849 – William R. Day, American jurist and politician, 36th United States Secretary of State (died 1923)
- 1852 – Cap Anson, American baseball player and manager (died 1922)
- 1863 – Augustus Edward Hough Love, English mathematician and theorist (died 1940)
- 1865 – Ursula Ledóchowska, Polish-Austrian nun and saint, founded the Congregation of the Ursulines of the Agonizing Heart of Jesus (died 1939)
- 1866 – Ernest Starling, English physiologist and academic (died 1927)
- 1868 – Zdeňka Wiedermannová-Motyčková, Moravian educator (died 1915)
- 1875 – Aleksander Tõnisson, Estonian general and politician, 5th Estonian Minister of War (died 1941)
- 1877 – Matsudaira Tsuneo, Japanese diplomat (died 1949)
- 1878 – Emil Fuchs, German-American lawyer and businessman (died 1961)
- 1878 – Demetrios Petrokokkinos, Greek tennis player (died 1942)
- 1879 – Henri Tauzin, French hurdler (died 1918)
- 1882 – Artur Schnabel, Polish pianist and composer (died 1951)
- 1885 – Karen Blixen, Danish writer (died 1962)
- 1888 – Herms Niel, German soldier, trombonist, and composer (died 1954)
- 1891 – George Adamski, Polish-American ufologist and author (died 1965)
- 1895 – Robert Dean Frisbie, American soldier and author (died 1948)
- 1896 – Señor Wences, Spanish-American ventriloquist (died 1999)
- 1897 – Nisargadatta Maharaj, Indian philosopher and educator (died 1981)
- 1897 – Thornton Wilder, American novelist and playwright (died 1975)
- 1897 – Edouard Wyss-Dunant, Swiss physician and mountaineer (died 1983)
- 1899 – Aleksander Klumberg, Estonian decathlete and coach (died 1958)

=== 1901–present ===
- 1903 – Nicolas Nabokov, Russian-American composer and educator (died 1978)
- 1903 – Gregor Piatigorsky, Ukrainian-American cellist and educator (died 1976)
- 1903 – Morgan Taylor, American hurdler and coach (died 1975)
- 1905 – Louis Jean Heydt, American journalist and actor (died 1960)
- 1905 – Arthur Lake, American actor (died 1987)
- 1906 – Sidney Garfield, American physician, co-founded Kaiser Permanente (died 1984)
- 1909 – Alain Poher, French politician, President of France (died 1996)
- 1910 – Evangelos Averoff, Greek historian and politician, Greek Minister of Defence (died 1990)
- 1910 – Ivan Goff, Australian screenwriter and producer (died 1999)
- 1910 – Helenio Herrera, French footballer and manager (died 1997)
- 1911 – Hervé Bazin, French author and poet (died 1996)
- 1911 – Lester Rodney, American soldier and journalist (died 2009)
- 1912 – Marta Eggerth, Hungarian-American actress and singer (died 2013)
- 1914 – George Davis, American art director (died 1984)
- 1914 – Mac Raboy, American illustrator (died 1967)
- 1915 – Martin Clemens, Scottish soldier (died 2009)
- 1915 – Joe Foss, American general and politician, 20th Governor of South Dakota (died 2003)
- 1915 – Regina Ghazaryan, Armenian painter (died 1999)
- 1916 – Win Maung, 3rd President of Union of Myanmar (died 1989)
- 1916 – A. Thiagarajah, Sri Lankan educator and politician (died 1981)
- 1916 – Sirimavo Bandaranaike, Prime Minister of Sri Lanka, world's first female prime minister (died 2000)
- 1918 – William Holden, American actor (died 1981)
- 1919 – Gilles Lamontagne, Canadian lieutenant and politician, 24th Lieutenant Governor of Quebec (died 2016)
- 1919 – Chavela Vargas, Costa Rican-Mexican singer-songwriter and actress (died 2012)
- 1920 – Edmonde Charles-Roux, French journalist and author (died 2016)
- 1921 – Melvin Storer, American shipfitter and navy diver (died 2003)
- 1923 – Lindsay Anderson, English actor, director, and screenwriter (died 1994)
- 1923 – Solly Hemus, American baseball player, coach, and manager (died 2017)
- 1923 – Neville McNamara, Australian air marshal (died 2014)
- 1923 – Gianni Raimondi, Italian lyric tenor (died 2008)
- 1923 – Harry Reasoner, American soldier and journalist (died 1991)
- 1924 – Kenneth Norman Jones, Australian public servant (died 2022)
- 1924 – Donald Richie, American-Japanese author and critic (died 2013)
- 1925 – René Moawad, Lebanese lawyer and politician, 13th President of Lebanon (died 1989)
- 1926 – Joan Lorring, British actress (died 2014)
- 1926 – Gerry McNeil, Canadian ice hockey player and manager (died 2004)
- 1927 – Margot Honecker, East German politician and First Lady (died 2016)
- 1928 – Victor Lownes, American businessman (died 2017)
- 1928 – Cynthia Ozick, American short story writer, novelist, and essayist
- 1928 – Heinz Putzl, Austrian fencer
- 1928 – Fabien Roy, Canadian accountant and politician (died 2023)
- 1929 – James Last, German-American bassist, composer, and bandleader (died 2015)
- 1930 – Chris Barber, English trombonist and bandleader (died 2021)
- 1931 – John Barrett, English tennis player and sportscaster
- 1931 – Malcolm Browne, American journalist and photographer (died 2012)
- 1931 – Bill Ramsey, American jazz and pop singer, journalist and actor (died 2021)
- 1934 – Don Kirshner, American songwriter and producer (died 2011)
- 1934 – David J. Farber, American computer scientist (died 2026)
- 1934 – Peter Morris, Australian-English surgeon and academic (died 2022)
- 1935 – Bud Paxson, American broadcaster, founded Home Shopping Network and Pax TV (died 2015)
- 1936 – Urs Wild, Swiss chemist (died 2022)
- 1937 – Ronald Hamowy, Canadian historian and academic (died 2012)
- 1937 – Ferdinand Piëch, Austrian-German engineer and businessman (died 2019)
- 1938 – Ben Barnes, American businessman and politician, 36th Lieutenant Governor of Texas
- 1938 – Doug Lewis, Canadian lawyer and politician, 41st Canadian Minister of Justice
- 1938 – Ronald H. Miller, American theologian, author, and academic (died 2011)
- 1938 – Kerry Wendell Thornley, American theorist and author (died 1988)
- 1939 – Robert Miller, American art dealer (died 2011)
- 1940 – Eric Dancer, English businessman and politician, Lord Lieutenant of Devon
- 1940 – Billy Fury, English singer-songwriter (died 1983)
- 1940 – John McCririck, English journalist (died 2019)
- 1940 – Chuck Menville, American animator and screenwriter (died 1992)
- 1940 – Anja Silja, German soprano and actress
- 1940 – Agostino Vallini, Italian cardinal and vicar general of Rome
- 1941 – Lagle Parek, Estonian architect and politician, Estonian Minister of the Interior
- 1942 – Buster Williams, American jazz bassist
- 1942 – Dnyaneshwar Agashe, Indian businessman and cricketer (died 2009)
- 1943 – Richard Allen Epstein, American lawyer, author, and academic
- 1946 – Clare Francis, English sailor and author
- 1947 – Nigel Emslie, Lord Emslie, Scottish lawyer and judge
- 1947 – Richard Field, English lawyer and judge
- 1947 – Sherrie Levine, American photographer
- 1947 – Tsutomu Wakamatsu, Japanese baseball player, coach, and manager
- 1948 – Jan Hammer, Czech pianist, composer, and producer
- 1948 – Alice Harden, American educator and politician (died 2012)
- 1948 – Pekka Vasala, Finnish runner
- 1951 – Olivia Hussey, Argentinian-English actress (died 2024)
- 1951 – Börje Salming, Swedish ice hockey player and businessman (died 2022)
- 1952 – Joe Alaskey, American voice actor (died 2016)
- 1952 – Pierre Guité, Canadian ice hockey player
- 1952 – John McColl, English general and politician, Lieutenant Governor of Jersey
- 1952 – Željko Ražnatović, Serbian commander "Arkan" (died 2000)
- 1952 – John Robertson, Scottish businessman and politician
- 1954 – Riccardo Patrese, Italian race car driver
- 1954 – Roddy Piper, Canadian professional wrestler and actor (died 2015)
- 1954 – Michael Sembello, American singer-songwriter and guitarist
- 1955 – Todd Lickliter, American basketball player and coach
- 1955 – Pete Shelley, English singer-songwriter and guitarist (died 2018)
- 1955 – Mike Stroud, English physician and explorer
- 1956 – Colin Tyre, Lord Tyre, Scottish lawyer and judge
- 1957 – Teri Austin, Canadian actress
- 1957 – Afrika Bambaataa, American disc jockey (died 2026)
- 1957 – Dwane Casey, American basketball coach
- 1957 – Nick Hornby, English novelist, essayist, lyricist, and screenwriter
- 1957 – Julia Macur, English lawyer and judge
- 1957 – Frank McDonough, British historian
- 1958 – Laslo Babits, Canadian javelin thrower (died 2013)
- 1959 – Sean Bean, English actor
- 1959 – Jimmy Mann, Canadian ice hockey player
- 1959 – Li Meisu, Chinese shot putter
- 1960 – Vladimir Polyakov, Russian pole vaulter
- 1961 – Norman Cowans, Jamaican-English cricketer
- 1961 – Boomer Esiason, American football player and sportscaster
- 1961 – Bella Freud, English fashion designer
- 1962 – Paul Nicholls, English jockey and trainer
- 1964 – Ken Daneyko, Canadian ice hockey player and sportscaster
- 1964 – Maynard James Keenan, American singer-songwriter and producer
- 1964 – Rachel Notley, Canadian politician
- 1964 – Lela Rochon, American actress
- 1966 – Vikram, Indian actor and singer
- 1967 – Henry Ian Cusick, Peruvian-Scottish actor
- 1967 – Kimberly Elise, American actress
- 1967 – Marquis Grissom, American baseball player and coach
- 1967 – Ian Jones, New Zealand rugby player
- 1967 – Barnaby Joyce, Australian politician, 17th Deputy Prime Minister of Australia
- 1967 – Liz Phair, American singer-songwriter and guitarist
- 1968 – Julie Fagerholt, Danish fashion designer
- 1968 – Phil Henderson, American basketball player and coach (died 2013)
- 1968 – Eric Lamaze, Canadian jockey
- 1968 – Roger Twose, New Zealand cricketer
- 1968 – Richie Woodhall, English boxer and trainer
- 1970 – Redman, American rapper, producer, and actor
- 1971 – Claire Sweeney, English actress
- 1972 – Gary Bennett, American baseball player
- 1972 – Tony Boselli, American football player and sportscaster
- 1972 – Jennifer Garner, American actress
- 1972 – Muttiah Muralitharan, Sri Lankan cricketer
- 1972 – Yuichi Nishimura, Japanese footballer and referee
- 1972 – Terran Sandwith, Canadian ice hockey player
- 1973 – Katrin Koov, Estonian architect
- 1973 – Brett Maher, Australian basketball player and sportscaster
- 1973 – Theo Ratliff, American basketball player
- 1974 – Mikael Åkerfeldt, Swedish singer-songwriter, guitarist, and producer
- 1974 – Victoria Beckham, English singer and fashion designer
- 1975 – Heidi Alexander, English politician
- 1975 – Travis Roy, American ice hockey player (died 2020)
- 1976 – Maurice Wignall, Jamaican hurdler and long jumper
- 1977 – Chad Hedrick, American speed skater
- 1977 – Frederik Magle, Danish composer, organist, and pianist
- 1978 – Monika Bergmann-Schmuderer, German skier
- 1978 – Lindsay Hartley, American actress
- 1978 – Daniel Hensel, German composer and musicologist
- 1978 – Jason White, Scottish rugby player
- 1979 – Eric Brewer, Canadian ice hockey player
- 1979 – Marija Šestak, Serbian-Slovenian triple jumper
- 1980 – Fabián Vargas, Colombian footballer
- 1980 – Curtis Woodhouse, English footballer, boxer, and manager
- 1981 – Jenny Meadows, English runner
- 1981 – Hanna Pakarinen, Finnish singer-songwriter
- 1981 – Ryan Raburn, American baseball player
- 1981 – Chris Thompson, English runner
- 1981 – Zhang Yaokun, Chinese footballer
- 1982 – Brad Boyes, Canadian ice hockey player
- 1982 – Chuck Kobasew, Canadian ice hockey player
- 1982 – Tyron Woodley, American mixed martial artist
- 1983 – Stanislav Chistov, Russian ice hockey player
- 1983 – Roberto Jiménez, Peruvian footballer
- 1983 – Andrea Marcato, Italian rugby player
- 1984 – Pablo Sebastián Álvarez, Argentinian footballer
- 1984 – Jed Lowrie, American baseball player
- 1984 – Raffaele Palladino, Italian footballer
- 1985 – Rooney Mara, American actress
- 1985 – Luke Mitchell, Australian actor and model
- 1985 – Jo-Wilfried Tsonga, French tennis player
- 1986 – Romain Grosjean, French race car driver
- 1988 – Takahiro Moriuchi, Japanese singer-songwriter
- 1989 – Paraskevi Papachristou, Greek triple jumper
- 1989 – Avi Kaplan, singer and songwriter
- 1990 – Jonathan Brown, Welsh footballer
- 1992 – Lachlan Maranta, Australian rugby league footballer
- 1992 – Jo Jinho, South Korean singer
- 1994 – Alanna Goldie, Canadian fencer
- 1994 – Yang Hongseok, South Korean singer and actor
- 1995 – Jung Wheein, South Korean singer
- 1996 – Lorna Fitzgerald, British actress
- 1996 – Caitlin Parker, Australian boxer
- 1996 – Helene Spilling, Norwegian dancer
- 1998 – Anna Odine Strøm, Norwegian ski jumper and two-time Olympic champion
- 1998 – Suppapong Udomkaewkanjana (Saint), Thai actor and singer
- 2001 – Shin Ryujin, South Korean rapper, singer and dancer
- 2001 – Violette Dorange, French Professional Round the World Sailor
- 2005 – Antonio Nusa, Norwegian footballer

== Deaths ==
=== Pre-1600 ===
- 485 – Proclus, Greek mathematician and philosopher (born 412)
- 617 – Donnán of Eigg, Irish priest and saint
- 648 – Xiao, empress of the Sui dynasty
- 744 – Al-Walid II, Umayyad caliph (born 706)
- 818 – Bernard of Italy, Frankish king (born 797)
- 858 – Benedict III, pope of the Catholic Church
- 1071 – Manuel Komnenos, Byzantine military commander (born c. 1045)
- 1080 – Harald III of Denmark (born 1041)
- 1111 – Robert of Molesme, Christian saint and abbot (born 1027)
- 1298 – Árni Þorláksson, Icelandic bishop (born 1237)
- 1321 – Infanta Branca of Portugal, daughter of King Afonso III of Portugal (born 1259)
- 1331 – Robert de Vere, 6th Earl of Oxford, English nobleman (born 1257)
- 1344 – Constantine II, King of Armenia
- 1355 – Marin Falier, Doge of Venice (born 1285)
- 1427 – John IV, Duke of Brabant (born 1403)
- 1539 – George, Duke of Saxony (born 1471)
- 1574 – Joachim Camerarius, German scholar and translator (born 1500)

=== 1601–1900 ===
- 1669 – Antonio Bertali, Italian violinist and composer (born 1605)
- 1680 – Kateri Tekakwitha, Mohawk-born Native American saint (born 1656)
- 1695 – Juana Inés de la Cruz, Mexican poet and scholar (born 1651)
- 1696 – Marie de Rabutin-Chantal, marquise de Sévigné, French author (born 1626)
- 1711 – Joseph I, Holy Roman Emperor (born 1678)
- 1713 – David Hollatz, Polish pastor and theologian (born 1648)
- 1764 – Johann Mattheson, German lexicographer and composer (born 1681)
- 1790 – Benjamin Franklin, American inventor, publisher, and politician, 6th President of Pennsylvania (born 1706)
- 1799 – Richard Jupp, English surveyor and architect (born 1728)
- 1840 – Hannah Webster Foster, American journalist and author (born 1758)
- 1843 – Samuel Morey, American engineer (born 1762)
- 1882 – George Jennings, English engineer and plumber, invented the flush toilet (born 1810)
- 1888 – E. G. Squier, American archaeologist and journalist (born 1821)
- 1892 – Alexander Mackenzie, Scottish-Canadian politician, 2nd Prime Minister of Canada (born 1822)

=== 1901–present ===
- 1919 – Svetozar Ćorović, Serbian novelist (born 1875)
- 1921 – Manwel Dimech, Maltese journalist, author, and philosopher (born 1860)
- 1923 – Laurence Ginnell, Irish lawyer and politician (born 1852)
- 1930 – Alexander Golovin, Russian painter and stage designer (born 1863)
- 1933 – Kote Marjanishvili, Georgian director and playwright (born 1872)
- 1936 – Charles Ruijs de Beerenbrouck, Dutch lawyer and politician, 28th Prime Minister of the Netherlands (born 1873)
- 1942 – Jean Baptiste Perrin, French-American physicist and chemist, Nobel Prize laureate (born 1870)
- 1944 – J. T. Hearne, English cricketer and coach (born 1867)
- 1944 – Dimitrios Psarros, Greek lieutenant, founded the National and Social Liberation (born 1893)
- 1946 – Juan Bautista Sacasa, Nicaraguan medical doctor, politician and 20th President of Nicaragua (born 1874)
- 1948 – Kantarō Suzuki, Japanese admiral and politician, 42nd Prime Minister of Japan (born 1868)
- 1954 – Lucrețiu Pătrășcanu, Romanian lawyer and politician, Romanian Minister of Justice (born 1900)
- 1960 – Eddie Cochran, American singer-songwriter and guitarist (born 1938)
- 1961 – Elda Anderson, American physicist and health researcher (born 1899)
- 1967 – Red Allen, American singer and trumpet player (born 1908)
- 1975 – Sarvepalli Radhakrishnan, Indian philosopher and politician, 2nd President of India (born 1888)
- 1976 – Henrik Dam, Danish biochemist and physiologist, Nobel Prize laureate (born 1895)
- 1977 – William Conway, Irish cardinal (born 1913)
- 1983 – Felix Pappalardi, American singer-songwriter, bass player, and producer (born 1939)
- 1984 – Claude Provost, Canadian-American ice hockey player (born 1933)
- 1986 – Marcel Dassault, French businessman, founded Dassault Aviation (born 1892)
- 1987 – Cecil Harmsworth King, English publisher (born 1901)
- 1987 – Dick Shawn, American actor (born 1923)
- 1988 – Louise Nevelson, Ukrainian-American sculptor and educator (born 1900)
- 1990 – Ralph Abernathy, American minister and activist (born 1936)
- 1993 – Turgut Özal, Turkish engineer and politician, 8th president of Turkey (born 1927)
- 1993 – Gamal Hamdan, Egyptian scholar and geographer (born 1928)
- 1994 – Roger Wolcott Sperry, American psychologist and biologist, Nobel Prize laureate (born 1913)
- 1995 – Frank E. Resnik, American sergeant and businessman (born 1928)
- 1996 – Piet Hein, Danish poet and mathematician (born 1905)
- 1997 – Chaim Herzog, Israeli general, lawyer, and politician, 6th President of Israel (born 1918)
- 1998 – Linda McCartney, American photographer, activist, and musician (born 1941)
- 2003 – Robert Atkins, American physician and cardiologist, created the Atkins diet (born 1930)
- 2003 – H. B. Bailey, American race car driver (born 1936)
- 2003 – John Paul Getty Jr., American-English philanthropist (born 1932)
- 2003 – Earl King, American blues singer, guitarist and songwriter (born 1934)
- 2003 – Yiannis Latsis, Greek businessman (born 1910)
- 2004 – Edmond Pidoux, Swiss author and poet (born 1908)
- 2006 – Jean Bernard, French physician and haematologist (born 1907)
- 2006 – Scott Brazil, American director and producer (born 1955)
- 2006 – Henderson Forsythe, American actor (born 1917)
- 2007 – Kitty Carlisle, American actress, singer, socialite and game show panelist (born 1910)
- 2008 – Aimé Césaire, Caribbean-French poet and politician (born 1913)
- 2008 – Danny Federici, American organist and accordion player (born 1950)
- 2011 – Eric Gross, Austrian-Australian pianist and composer (born 1926)
- 2011 – Michael Sarrazin, Canadian actor (born 1940)
- 2011 – Robert Vickrey, American artist and author (born 1926)
- 2012 – Leila Berg, English journalist and author (born 1917)
- 2012 – J. Quinn Brisben, American educator and politician (born 1934)
- 2012 – Dimitris Mitropanos, Greek singer (born 1948)
- 2012 – Nityananda Mohapatra, Indian journalist, poet, and politician (born 1912)
- 2012 – Jonathan V. Plaut, American rabbi and author (born 1942)
- 2012 – Stanley Rogers Resor, American soldier, lawyer, and politician, 9th United States Secretary of the Army (born 1917)
- 2013 – Carlos Graça, São Toméan politician, Prime Minister of São Tomé and Príncipe (born 1931)
- 2013 – Bi Kidude, Tanzanian Taarab singer (born ≈1910)
- 2013 – Yngve Moe, Norwegian bass player and songwriter (born 1957)
- 2013 – V. S. Ramadevi, Indian politician, 13th Governor of Karnataka (born 1934)
- 2014 – Gabriel García Márquez, Colombian journalist and author, Nobel Prize laureate (born 1927)
- 2014 – Bernat Klein, Serbian-Scottish fashion designer and painter (born 1922)
- 2014 – Wojciech Leśnikowski, Polish–American architect and academic (born 1938)
- 2014 – Karpal Singh, Malaysian lawyer and politician (born 1940)
- 2015 – Robert P. Griffin, American soldier, lawyer, and politician (born 1923)
- 2015 – Scotty Probasco, American businessman and philanthropist (born 1928)
- 2015 – Jeremiah J. Rodell, American general (born 1921)
- 2015 – A. Alfred Taubman, American businessman and philanthropist (born 1924)
- 2016 – Chyna, American wrestler (born 1969)
- 2016 – Doris Roberts, American actress (born 1925)
- 2018 – Barbara Bush, American political matriarch and literacy advocate, First Lady of the United States (1989–1993), and Second Lady of the United States (1981–1989) (born 1925)
- 2018 – Carl Kasell, American radio personality (born 1934)
- 2019 – Alan García, Peruvian lawyer and politician, twice President of Peru (born 1949)
- 2019 – Gwen Marston, American quilter and writer (born 1936)
- 2022 – Radu Lupu, Romanian pianist (born 1945)

== Holidays and observances ==
- Christian feast day:
  - Donnán of Eigg
  - Henry Heath
  - Kateri Tekakwitha (Canada)
  - Robert of Molesme
  - Shemon bar Sabbae
  - April 17 (Eastern Orthodox liturgics)
- Evacuation Day (Syria), celebrates the recognition of the independence of Syria from France in 1946.
- FAO Day (Iraq)
- Flag Day (American Samoa)
- Malbec World Day
- Women's Day (Gabon)
- World Hemophilia Day
