= National Board of Review Awards 2006 =

Annual US film awards ceremony

78th NBR Awards

January 9, 2007

Best Film:
Letters from Iwo Jima

The 78th National Board of Review Awards, awarded to the best in film for 2006, were presented by the National Board of Review on 9 January 2007.

== Top 10 Films ==
In alphabetical order:

- Babel
- Blood Diamond
- The Departed
- The Devil Wears Prada
- Flags of Our Fathers
- The History Boys
- Letters from Iwo Jima
- Little Miss Sunshine
- Notes on a Scandal
- The Painted Veil

== Winners ==
Best Film:

- Letters from Iwo Jima

Best Director:

- Martin Scorsese – The Departed

Best Actor:

- Forest Whitaker – The Last King of Scotland

Best Actress:

- Helen Mirren – The Queen

Best Supporting Actor:

- Djimon Hounsou – Blood Diamond

Best Supporting Actress:

- Catherine O'Hara – For Your Consideration

Best Screenplay – Original:

- Zach Helm – Stranger Than Fiction

Best Screenplay – Adapted:

- Ron Nyswaner – The Painted Veil

Best Animated Feature:

- Cars

Best Foreign Language Film:

- Volver, Spain

Best Documentary Feature:

- An Inconvenient Truth

Best Acting by an Ensemble:

- The Departed

Breakthrough Male Performances:

- Ryan Gosling – Half Nelson

Breakthrough Female Performances (tie):

- Jennifer Hudson – Dreamgirls
- Rinko Kikuchi – Babel

Best Directorial Debut:

- Jason Reitman - Thank You For Smoking

Career Achievement Award:

- Eli Wallach

Career Award for Producing:

- Irwin Winkler

William K. Everson Award for Film History:

- Donald Krim

Freedom of Expression Award:

- Water
- World Trade Center

== Top Foreign Films ==
- Curse of the Golden Flower
- Days of Glory
- Pan's Labyrinth
- Volver
- Water

== Top Documentaries ==
- An Inconvenient Truth
- 51 Birch Street
- Iraq in Fragments
- Dixie Chicks: Shut Up and Sing
- Wordplay

== Top Independent Films ==
- 10 Items or Less
- Akeelah and the Bee
- Bobby
- Catch a Fire
- Copying Beethoven
- A Guide to Recognizing Your Saints
- Half Nelson
- The Illusionist
- Lonesome Jim
- Sherrybaby
- Thank You for Smoking
