= Alksnis =

Family name

Origin
- Origin: Latvian
- Meaning: "alder"

Other names
- Variant form: Elksnis/Elksne

Alksnis (married feminine: Alksne) is a Latvian surname, derived from the Latvian word for "alder". It is derived from the Baltic branch of Indo-European. Alksnis does not resemble Slavic or Scandinavian, the Baltic States' closest neighbors. The Baltic branch contains only two other languages. Lithuanian and Old Prussian. The latter is extinct.

Individuals with the surname include:

- Ādams Alksnis (1864–1897), Latvian painter
- Gunnar Alksnis (1931–2011), Latvian-American philosopher and theologian
- Viktor Alksnis (1950–2025), Russian politician and former Soviet Air Force colonel of Latvian descent
- Yakov Alksnis (1897–1938), commander of Red Army Air Forces from 1931 to 1937
