= Ćurko =

Ćurko or Čurko is a surname of Slavic origin. Notable people with the name include:

- Goran Ćurko (born 1968), Serbian footballer
- Matej Čurko (1968–2011), Slovak murderer
- Saša Ćurko (born 1996), Serbian footballer

== See also ==
- Ćurković, surname
