= Ćurković =

Ćurković is a Serbo-Croatian surname. Notable people with the name include:

- Areta Ćurković (born 1973), Croatian actress
- Ivan Ćurković (born 1944), Serbian footballer and sports executive

== See also ==
- Ćurko, surname
