= San Francisco International Film Festival =

Annual film festival in San Francisco

- Location: San Francisco, California, U.S.
- Language: International
- Website: sffilm.org
- 68th 66th

The San Francisco International Film Festival (SFIFF), organized by SFFILM, is held each spring for two weeks, presenting around 200 films from over 50 countries. The festival highlights current trends in international film and video production with an emphasis on work that has not yet secured U.S. distribution. In 2009, it served around 82,000 patrons, with screenings held in San Francisco and Berkeley.

In March 2014, Noah Cowan, former executive director of the Toronto International Film Festival, became executive director of the SFFS and SFIFF, replacing Ted Hope. Prior to Hope, the festival was briefly headed by Bingham Ray, who served as SFFS executive director until his death after only ten weeks on the job in January 2012. Graham Leggat became the executive director of the San Francisco Film Society on October 17, 2005. The Scottish-born Leggat died on August 25, 2011, from cancer, aged 51.

== History ==
Founded in 1957 by film exhibitor Irving "Bud" Levin, the SFIFF began as a philanthropic effort to secure San Francisco's place in the international arts scene as well as expose locals to cinema as an art form. The first festival screening was on December 4–18, 1957 at the Metro Theatre in Cow Hollow. Akira Kurosawa's Throne of Blood; Helmut Käutner's The Captain from Köpenick (1956 film); and Satyajit Ray's Pather Panchali were among the films that screened at the first festival.

One obstacle in the early years was the lack of support from the major Hollywood studios, suggested reasons being the growing threat of international films' appeal and a fear that the festival would draw commercial attention away from the Oscars. It was not until 1959 that a major American film, Henry King's Beloved Infidel, starring Gregory Peck and Deborah Kerr, played at SFIFF.

== Honors and tributes ==
=== Irving M. Levin Directing Award ===
The Festival's directing award is named after SFIFF's founder, Irving Levin. From 2003 to 2014, the award was known as the Founder's Directing Award. Prior to 2003, the award was known as the Akira Kurosawa Award. Recipients include:

- Scott Cooper, 2025
- Denis Villeneuve, 2024
- Greta Gerwig, 2023
- Ryan Coogler, 2022
- Jane Campion, 2021
- Chloé Zhao, 2020
- Marielle Heller, 2019
- Steve McQueen, 2018
- Kathryn Bigelow, 2017
- Mira Nair, 2016
- Guillermo del Toro, 2015
- Richard Linklater, 2014
- Philip Kaufman, 2013
- Kenneth Branagh, 2012
- Oliver Stone, 2011
- Walter Salles, 2010
- Francis Ford Coppola, 2009
- Mike Leigh, 2008
- Spike Lee, 2007
- Werner Herzog, 2006
- Taylor Hackford, 2005
- Miloš Forman, 2004
- Robert Altman, 2003
- Warren Beatty, 2002
- Clint Eastwood, 2001
- Abbas Kiarostami, 2000
- Arturo Ripstein, 1999
- Im Kwon-taek, 1998
- Francesco Rosi, 1997
- Arthur Penn, 1996
- Stanley Donen, 1995
- Manoel de Oliveira, 1994
- Ousmane Sembène, 1993
- Satyajit Ray, 1992
- Marcel Carné, 1991
- Jirí Menzel, 1990
- Joseph L. Mankiewicz, 1989
- Robert Bresson, 1988
- Michael Powell, 1987
- Akira Kurosawa, 1986

=== Peter J. Owens Award ===
Named for the longtime San Francisco benefactor of arts and charitable organizations Peter J. Owens (1936–91), this award honors an actor whose work exemplifies brilliance, independence and integrity.
Recent recipients include:

- Ellen Burstyn, 2016
- Richard Gere, 2015
- Jeremy Irons, 2014
- Harrison Ford, 2013
- Judy Davis, 2012
- Terence Stamp, 2011
- Robert Duvall, 2010
- Robert Redford, 2009
- Maria Bello, 2008
- Robin Williams, 2007
- Ed Harris, 2006
- Joan Allen, 2005
- Chris Cooper, 2004
- Dustin Hoffman, 2003
- Kevin Spacey, 2002
- Stockard Channing, 2001
- Winona Ryder, 2000
- Sean Penn, 1999
- Nicolas Cage, 1998
- Annette Bening, 1997
- Harvey Keitel, 1996

=== Kanbar Award ===
Recipients of the Kanbar Award for excellence in screenwriting include:

- Tom McCarthy, 2016
- Paul Schrader, 2015
- Stephen Gaghan, 2014
- Eric Roth, 2013
- David Webb Peoples, 2012
- Frank Pierson, 2011
- James Schamus, 2010
- James Toback, 2009
- Peter Morgan, 2008
- Robert Towne, 2007
- Jean-Claude Carrière, 2006
- Paul Haggis, 2005

=== Mel Novikoff Award ===
Named in honor of Surf Theater, San Francisco film exhibitor, Mel Novikoff (1922–87) , this award is given to an individual or organization notable for making significant contributions to the Bay Area's film community.
Recent recipients include:

- Gary Meyer, 2024
- Firelight Media, 2023
- Arena, 2019
- Annette Insdorf, 2018
- Tom Luddy, 2017
- Janus Films and The Criterion Collection, 2016
- Lenny Borger, 2015
- David Thomson, 2014
- Peter von Bagh, 2013
- Pierre Rissient, 2012
- Serge Bromberg, 2011
- Roger Ebert, 2010
- Bruce Goldstein, 2009
- James Lewis Hoberman, 2008
- Kevin Brownlow, 2007
- Anita Monga, 2005
- Paolo Cherchi Usai, 2004
- Manny Farber, 2003
- David Francis, 2002
- Cahiers du cinéma, 2001
- San Francisco Cinematheque, 2001
- Donald Krim, 2000
- David Shepard, 2000
- Adrienne Mancia, 1998
- Donald Richie, 1990

=== Golden Gate Persistence of Vision Award ===
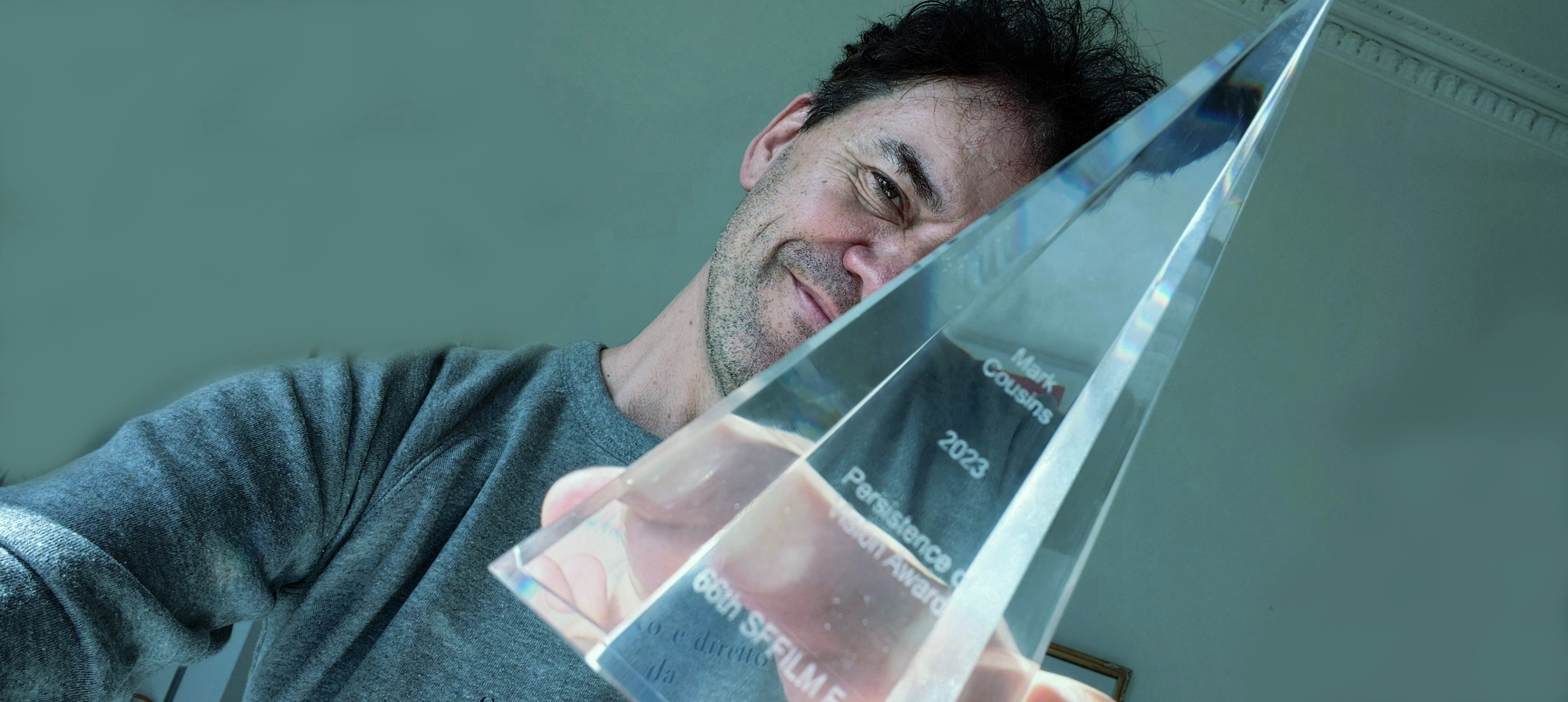
Mark Cousins with the Persistence of Vision Award 2023

The POV Award honors the lifetime achievement of a filmmaker whose work is crafting documentaries, short films, animation or work for television.
Recent recipients include:

- Mark Cousins, 2023
- Nathaniel Dorsky, 2018
- Aardman Animations, 2016
- Kim Longinotto, 2015
- Isaac Julien, 2014
- Jem Cohen, 2013
- Barbara Kopple, 2012
- Matthew Barney, 2011
- Don Hertzfeldt, 2010
- Lourdes Portillo, 2009
- Errol Morris, 2008
- Heddy Honigmann, 2007
- Guy Maddin, 2006
- Adam Curtis, 2005
- Jon Else, 2004
- Pat O'Neill, 2003
- Fernando Birri, 2002
- Kenneth Anger, 2001
- Faith Hubley, 2000
- Johan van der Keuken, 1999
- Robert Frank, 1998
- Jan Švankmajer, 1997

=== George Gund III Craft of Cinema Award ===
The George Gund III Craft of Cinema Award, given in tribute to the longstanding Film Society chairman of the board who died in 2013, honors filmmakers for their contributions to the art of cinema.
Recent recipients include:

- Peter Coyote, 2016
- Maurice Kanbar, 2015
- John Lasseter, 2014
- Ray Dolby, 2013

=== Midnight Awards ===
The Film Festival's Midnight Awards were given from 2007–2011 to honor a young American actor and actress who have made outstanding contributions to independent and Hollywood cinema.
Recent recipients include:

- Clifton Collins, Jr. and Zoe Saldaña, 2011
- Evan Rachel Wood and Elijah Wood, 2009
- Rose McGowan and Jason Lee, 2008
- Rosario Dawson and Sam Rockwell, 2007

=== 60th Anniversary Gala changes ===
In 2017, the San Francisco Film Society made a "strategic move" to set its 60th anniversary SF Film Awards Night closer to awards season in early December.

== Awards and prizes ==
=== New Directors Award ===
This $15,000 cash award is given to independent filmmakers to the spotlight an emerging director. Films in this juried competition must be the director's first narrative feature and are selected for their unique artistic sensibility or vision.

=== Golden Gate Awards ===
The Golden Gate Awards is the competitive section for documentaries, animation, shorts, experimental film, and video, youth works and works for television. Eligibility requires that entries have a San Francisco Bay Area premiere and be exempt from a previous multiday commercial theatrical run or media broadcast of any kind. The festival currently awards cash prizes in the following categories:

- Documentary Feature - prize: $20,000
- Bay Area Documentary Feature - prize: $15,000
- Documentary Short - prize: $5,000
- Narrative Short - prize: $5,000
- Animated Short - prize: $2,000
- Bay Area Short, First Prize - prize: $2,000
- Bay Area Short, Second Prize - prize: $1,500
- New Visions Short - prize: $1,500
- Youth Work - prize: $1,500
- Family Film - prize: $1,500

The Academy of Motion Picture Arts and Sciences recognizes the San Francisco International Film Festival as a qualifying festival for the short films (live action and animated) competitions of the 81st annual Academy Awards.

=== FIPRESCI Prize ===
Selected by the International Federation of Film Critics, the FIPRESCI Prize aims to promote film art, to encourage new and young cinema and to help films get better distribution and win greater public attention.

== State of Cinema Address ==
Each year, the festival invites a prominent thinker to discuss the intersecting worlds of contemporary cinema, culture and society. Recent speakers include:

- Boots Riley, 2019
- Wesley Morris, 2016
- Douglas Trumbull, 2015
- Steven Soderbergh, 2013
- Jonathan Lethem, 2012
- Christine Vachon, 2011
- Walter Murch, 2010
- Mary Ellen Mark, 2009
- Kevin Kelly, 2008
- Peter Sellars, 2007
- Tilda Swinton, 2006
- Brad Bird, 2005
- B. Ruby Rich, 2004
- Michel Ciment, 2003

== Live music and film ==
The San Francisco International Film Festival also involves live music and film events, which usually feature contemporary musicians performing original scores to classic silent films. Music/film pairings at SFIFF have included:

- Scott Amendola, Matthias Bossi, Mike Patton, and William Winant accompanying Waxworks (1924 Film), Directed Paul Leni, 2013
- Merrill Garbus (tUnE-yArDs) with Buster Keaton short films, 2012
- Tindersticks with the films of Claire Denis, 2011
- Stephin Merritt with 20,000 Leagues Under the Sea (1916 film), 2010
- Dengue Fever (band) with The Lost World (1925 film), 2009
- Black Francis with The Golem (1920 film), 2008
- Jonathan Richman with The Phantom Carriage, 2007
- Deerhoof with Heaven and Earth Magic, 2006
- American Music Club with Street Angel (1928 film), 2005
- Lambchop (band) with Sunrise: A Song of Two Humans, 2003
- Superchunk with A Page of Madness, 2002
- Yo La Tengo with Jean Painlevé short films, 2001
- Tom Verlaine with classic silent short films, 2000

== See also ==
- San Francisco Film Society
