= Paul B. Ferrara =

Paul Benjamin Ferrara (November 2, 1942 – May 30, 2011) was a scientist and administrator who pioneered the use of DNA profiling in America.

== Early life and education ==
Ferrara graduated from Syracuse University and State University of New York College of Environmental Science and Forestry with doctorate degree in organic chemistry.

== Career ==
In 1987 the private New York laboratory, Lifecodes, began assisting Dr. Ferrara in his efforts to establish a DNA laboratory for the state of Virginia.

In 1988 Timothy Spencer, the "Southside Strangler", became first serial killer in the United States to be convicted on the basis of DNA evidence. Spencer committed three rapes and murders in Richmond Virginia, and one in Arlington, Virginia in the fall of 1987.

Ferrara recognized the potential utility of the precedent that had been set in Spencer case, and immediately focused his political savvy on convincing the Virginia General Assembly to fund the creation of the first State DNA Database in the country.

In 1989 under his leadership, Virginia became the first state laboratory capable of performing DNA fingerprinting. The FBI had started its limited DNA laboratory operations just four months earlier.

In addition to his directorship of the Virginia Department of Forensic Science (VA-DFS), Dr. Ferrara was an honorary professor at Virginia Commonwealth University. Through his passion for teaching and research, as well as his commitment to developing a nationally recognized Forensic Science educational program at VCU, the program officially became a department in 2005.

== Later life and legacy ==
In the mid-2000s, Dr. Ferrara was diagnosed with early-stage lung cancer. Several years after the initial lung surgery, it was discovered that the cancer had spread.

Dr. Ferrara died on May 30, 2011, of brain cancer at the age of 68.

Upon approval of Governor McDonnell, the DFS Central Laboratory building was renamed the Paul B. Ferrara Building, in honor of the late department director who died in May 2011. A ceremony and reception was held at the Central Laboratory on November 18, 2011, to unveil the signage displaying the new building name.
