= Gamal Hamdan =

Egyptian scholar and geographer (1928–1993)

- جمال حمدان
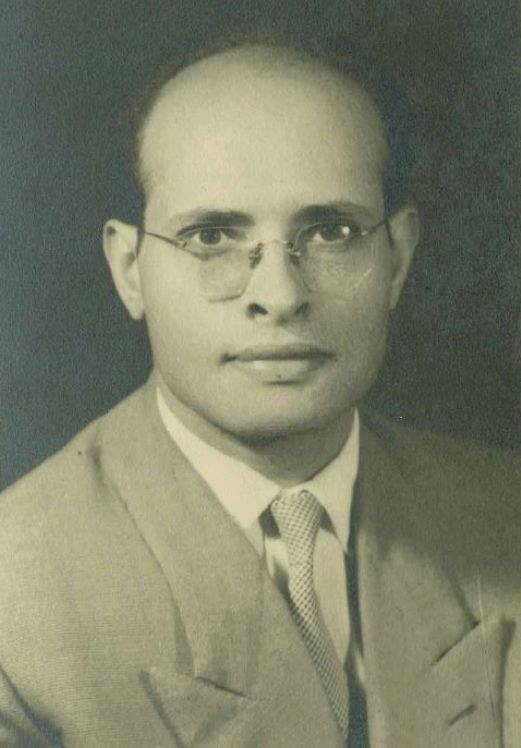
- Born: February 4, 1928; Nai village, Qalyubia Governorate, Egypt
- Died: April 17, 1993 (aged 65); Cairo, Egypt

Gamal Hamdan (Arabic: جمال حمدان; February 2, 1928 – April 17, 1993) was an Egyptian geographer and scholar known for his work on Egypt's geography, history, and culture.

His most renowned work, The Personality of Egypt, was a comprehensive study of Egypt’s historical and geopolitical significance, drawing from over 900 references in multiple languages.

== Early life and education ==
Hamdan was born on February 2, 1928, in Qalyubia Governorate, Egypt. He received his primary and secondary education in Egypt, ranking sixth amongst graduates nationwide, before attending Cairo University, where he earned a Bachelor of Arts degree in geography with distinction. He later obtained a scholarship to study at the University of Reading in the United Kingdom, where he completed his M.A. and PhD in geography as a student of Professor Austen Miller.

== Academic career and contributions ==
After completing his doctoral studies, Hamdan returned to Egypt and was appointed as a teacher at the Department of Geography of Cairo University in 1953. His academic work primarily focused on the geography of Egypt and the Arab world, employing a multidisciplinary approach that integrated geography, history, sociology, and political science. He developed the concept of "Living Geography," which emphasized understanding the interrelated aspects of a region's physical and human geography, whilst also focusing more on everyday life.

Hamdan authored several books and articles in both Arabic and English. It is said that his most famous work, The Personality of Egypt: A Study in the Genius of Location, would have doubtless faced "acute academic criticism" if it were published in modern times, because of critical flaws in his arguments.

== Awards and recognition ==
Hamdan received several awards for his contributions to geography and social sciences. In 1958, he was awarded the Egyptian State Prize for Science for his book Studies on the Arab World. Other honors include:

- State Incentive Prize in Arts and Letters (1959)
- State Prize of Merit in Social Science (1968)
- Scientific Criticism Award (State of Kuwait) (1986)
- Order of Merit (First Class) for Science and Arts (1988)

Despite these accolades, Hamdan declined official recognition after 1959 due to his reclusive nature.

== Personal life ==
Hamdan led a solitary life. In 1963, he resigned from his professorship, reportedly due to dissatisfaction with academic standards. He dedicated himself solely to research and writing, remaining unmarried throughout his life whilst avoiding all media engagements and public appearances. This voluntary seclusion apparently provided a conducive atmosphere for meditation, research and innovation.

== Death and legacy ==
On April 17, 1993, Hamdan passed away under circumstances that remain unclear.

Hamdan's work continues to influence academic discourse on Egypt and the Arab world. His analyses and predictions, such as the dissolution of the Soviet Union, demonstrate his geopolitical insights. His interdisciplinary approach continues to be used as a framework for understanding the intricate relationships between geography, culture, and politics.
