= Luigi del Gallo Roccagiovine =

- Titular bishop of Camplum
- Church: Roman Catholic Church
- See: Titular See of Camplum
- In office: 1982–2011
- Predecessor: Celso Pereira de Almeida
- Successor: incumbent
- Previous post(s): Priest

Orders
- Ordination: 19 March 1950

Personal details
- Born: 12 July 1922; Rome, Italy
- Died: 12 May 2011 (aged 88)

Luigi del Gallo marquess di Roccagiovine (12 July 1922 – 12 May 2011) was an Italian Prelate of Catholic Church.

Son of Alessandro del Gallo Marquess of Roccagiovine and Maria Rosaria Lepri Marquise of Rota, Roccagiovine was born in Rome and was ordained a priest on 19 March 1950. He belonged to Roman noble family of the Marquesses of Roccagiovine. Del Gallo was appointed Titular Bishop of Camplum as well as an official of the Diocese of Rome ond 20 December 1982 and consecrated 6 January 1983. Roccagiovine retired as an official of the Diocese of Rome in 1997.

== See also ==
- Diocese of Rome
- List of marquesses in Italy
