= Epiphanios of Vryoula =

Epiphanios of Vryoula (January 23, 1935 – May 9, 2011) was the Eastern Orthodox archbishop of Spain and Portugal, under the jurisdiction of the Ecumenical Patriarchate of Constantinople.

Born Constantine Perialis in Ithaca, New York, he taught high school and college, until his ordaination to the priesthood in 1984. In 2003, he became the first archbishop of Spain and Portugal, and held that post until retirement in 2007, when he became titular metropolitan of Vryoula.
