= Roland Spångberg =

Swedish water polo player

Personal information
- Nationality: Swedish
- Born: 4 February 1923; Stockholm, Sweden
- Died: 9 May 2011 (aged 88); Stockholm, Sweden

Sport
- Sport: Water polo

Roland Spångberg (4 February 1923 – 9 May 2011) was a Swedish water polo player. He competed at the 1948 Summer Olympics and the 1952 Summer Olympics.
