= Trickle Up =

American non-profit organization

Trickle Up is a nonprofit international development organization that helps women living in extreme poverty by offering programs rooted in the Graduation Approach to support sustainable livelihoods and pathways out of poverty. Trickle Up's programs include seed capital grants, technical skills training, life skills training, coaching, and other linkages to existing government programs or services relevant to the participants' livelihood activity.

== History ==
Trickle Up was founded by American philanthropists Glen and Mildred Robbins Leet in 1974 with ten participants in Dominica. The name refers to trickle up economic theory and opposes Reagan era trickle down economics. In 1997, Trickle Up moved from the Leets’ basement into its first office, and by 1999, Trickle Up has supported women to start 82,544 businesses in 115 countries.

Starting in 2004, Trickle Up opened regional offices in West Africa, Asia, and Latin America. Currently, its offices are in New York City, Mexico City, and Kolkata.

== Programs ==
Trickle Up's programs use the theory of change behind BRAC's Targeting Ultra Poor (TUP) Program - The Graduation Approach. The core elements of this programmatic approach include participatory design, seed capital grants, sustainable livelihood development, market assessments, technical and life skills training, and coaching.

Trickle Up does not directly implement programs, but works with locally based nonprofit or government partners for their local knowledge and support with targeting and implementation, and in turn, provides technical assistance and capacity building for these organizations.

== Evidence ==
In 2015, Banerjee et al. published a study on a randomized control trial confirming the effectiveness of graduation programs to reduce poverty and contribute to sustainable development. The study took place across six countries with 21,000 participants.

Since then, economists like Esther Duflo have confirmed how graduation programs aim to address poverty traps and sustain results for participants after programs end. Trickle Up was also part of the consortium of the Innovations for Poverty Action randomized control trial examining the results of graduation programs for refugees and communities facing forced displacement.

== Recognition ==
Trickle Up is a two-time recipient the InterAction Disability Inclusion Award and has held Special Consultative Status with the United Nations Economic and Social Council since 1987.
