= Gilberto Aleman =

Spanish journalist, writer

- Born: German Gilberto Armas; 25 April 1931
- Died: 31 May 2011 (aged 80)
- Occupations: Journalist, writer

German Gilberto Armas, known as Gilberto Aleman (1931–2011) was a Spanish author and journalist, working in the Canary Islands.

== Career ==
Aleman was a part-time editor of La Leaf on Mondays from 1960 to 1979. The following year, he became chief editor of La Tarde, and retained this position until 1982.

== Books ==
- El Canto Del Mirlo, 1984
- Café el Aguila,1992
- Vuelos históricos en Tenerife,1993
- El carnaval, la fiesta prohibida,1996
- Episodios republicanos,1997
- Molinos de viento,1998
- Cuando vienes del campo, 2001
- La Banda Municipal, 2003
- Anaga, 2009

== Awards ==
- Canarias de Comunicación Prize (1995)
- Awards in recognition for journalism (2008) – Federation of Associations of Journalists of Spain (FAPE)
