= Irwin D. Mandel =

American biochemist and dentist

- Born: April 9, 1922
- Died: May 26, 2011 (aged 89)
- Occupations: Biochemist, Dentist

Irwin D. Mandel (April 9, 1922, in Brooklyn – May 26, 2011, in Montclair, New Jersey) was an American biochemist and dentist who was known for his research on the biochemistry of saliva. He was a founder of the preventive dentistry movement and established the first department of preventive dentistry at an American university, the Columbia University College of Dental Medicine. In 1985, he became the first recipient of the Gold Medal for Excellence in Dental Research by the American Dental Association.
