= Mildred Robbins Leet =

American entrepreneur and philanthropist

- Born: Mildred Elowsky; August 9, 1922; Brooklyn, New York, United States
- Died: May 3, 2011 (aged 88); Manhattan, New York, United States
- Education: New York University
- Occupations: Entrepreneur, philanthropist
- Known for: Co-founder and chair of Trickle Up
- Spouses: Louis J. Robbins (died 1970) Glen F. Leet (m. 1974)
- Children: 2

Mildred Robbins Leet (née Elowsky; August 9, 1922 – May 3, 2011) was an American entrepreneur and philanthropist. She was a co-founder and Chair Emerita of the Board of Directors of Trickle Up, a New York–based international non-governmental organization dedicated to alleviating poverty.

Trickle Up was established in 1979 to help the lowest-earning people worldwide take their first steps out of poverty by providing conditional seed capital and business training essential to the launch of a micro-enterprise.

One of the founders of United Cerebral Palsy in 1948, Leet became the first President of its Women's Division. From 1957 to 1964 she was the United Nations (UN) Representative for the National Council of Women of the USA. She served as President of the Council from 1964 to 1968, emphasizing civil rights, international peacekeeping and organizing the first Women's Conference on National Service. From 1968 to 1970 she was Vice President of the International Council of Women and became an active member of the Women's Advisory Committee on Poverty in the US Office of Economic Opportunity. She founded the UN Hospitality Information Service, resulting in the creation of the New York City Commission for UN and Consular Corps. From 1968 to 1974 she participated in the development of the International Peace Academy.

She organized an International Task Force of Women in 1978 to prepare for the 1979 UN Conference on Science and Technology for Development. She was appointed a member of the US Delegation and the preparation resulted in a resolution focusing on women in science and technology.

Leet was chair of the board of the Audrey Cohen College for Human Services, now known as the Metropolitan College of New York, from 1986 to 1999. She later served as Chair Emerita. Leet was also Vice President of the U.S. Committee for the United Nations Development Fund for Women (UNIFEM), which she helped found in 1984. She was a member of the Council on Foreign Relations, the Women's Forum, Inc. and the UN International Task Force on the Informal Sector Development in Africa. She was the chairwoman of African Action on AIDS helping fund scholarships for African Girl Orphans.

In 1990, she received the Interaction Award for Spirited Championship of the Role of Women. In 1989, WomenAid honored her in England, along with Wangari Maathai and Mother Teresa, with the Women of the World Award presented by Princess Diana. She received the 1986 Women of Conscience Award from the National Council of Women of the USA Inc. and was the 1985 recipient of the Theodore Kheel Award from the Institute for Mediation and Conflict Resolution.

With her husband, Glen Leet, she received, in 1994, the Champion of Enterprise Award from Avon Products Inc. and the Joseph C. Wilson Award from the Rochester Association for the United Nations for "promoting world peace and human understanding through their contributions to international relations, and to the resolutions of international problems." Mr. and Mrs. Leet were recipients of the 1993 Gleitsman Foundation Award for Achievement. In 1992, she and Glen Leet received the Presidential Points of Light Citation Award, the International Humanity Service Award from the American Red Cross Overseas Association, and the Award of Excellence from the U.S. Committee for UNIFEM.

Together with Glen Leet, she was awarded the 1988 President's Medal from Marymount Manhattan College President Colette Mahoney. The award was for "creating a future for thousands of impoverished people around the globe."

In 1995, Leet was honored by InterAction, an umbrella organization of 168 U.S.-based non-profit international development organizations, with the creation of the Mildred Robbins Leet Award. The award was established in recognition of her enduring dedication and contribution to raising awareness on gender issues. Recipients of the award included the Heifer Project International, the American Friends Service Committee, Save the Children and Partners of the Americas.

In July 1996, Mildred Robbins Leet and Glen Leet were awarded the International Entrepreneurship Award, at the First Global Women's Entrepreneurs Trade Fair and Investment Forum in Africa, convened in Accra, Ghana. In 1997, Leet received a distinguished service award from United Cerebral Palsy at their 50th Anniversary celebration. She received the Eleanor Schnurr Award from the United Nations Association. In 1998, Leet received the NAWBO-NYC Spirit Award from the National Association of Women Business Owners and the Advancing the Status of Women Award from the Soroptimist International of New York.

In 2002, she received the National Caring Award for the Caring Institute. In 2003, Leet was inducted into the National Women's Hall of Fame.

Leet was awarded a Doctor of Humane Letters degree from the Audrey Cohen College for Human Services, a Doctorate of Laws from Marymount College, Tarrytown, an Honorary Doctorate from Lynn University, an Honorary Doctorate from Norwich University, and an honorary doctorate from Connecticut College.

She received her Bachelor of Arts degree from New York University, and later, the Alumni Achievement Award of the New York University Alumni Association.
