= Omar Ahmad (politician) =

Mayor of San Carlos, California (1964–2011)

Mayor of San Carlos, California
- In office November 2010 – May 10, 2011
- Preceded by: Randy Royce
- Succeeded by: Andy Klein

Personal details
- Born: June 25, 1964 Ohio, U.S.
- Died: May 10, 2011 (aged 46) San Carlos, California, U.S.
- Education: University of Florida
- Profession: Internet entrepreneur former C.T.O. of Napster

Omar Ahmad (June 25, 1964 – May 10, 2011) was an American business executive and politician who served as a chief technology officer of Napster. In 2007, he was elected to the city council of San Carlos, California. He served as Mayor of San Carlos from November 2010 until his death in 2011.

== Biography ==
Omar Ahmad was born to immigrant parents from Pakistan in Ohio. His parents, Iftikhar and Nadira Ahmad, became American citizens on July 4, 1976. The family moved to Palatka, Florida, where Ahmad was raised. He pursued a bachelor's degree in materials science engineering at the University of Florida.

In 1991, Ahmad ran unsuccessfully as a candidate for the Gainesville City Commission. He soon left Gainesville, Florida, to take a position with the Discovery Channel in suburban Washington D.C.

=== Internet entrepreneur ===
Ahmad spent five years working at the Discovery Channel before moving to Silicon Valley, California in 1998 during the height of the dot-com bubble. His early ventures included positions at the now defunct @Home Network, GrandCentral (which is now Google Voice) and Netscape.

Ahmad then joined Napster as chief technical officer (C.T.O.). As Napster's C.T.O., Ahmad was responsible for shutting down the file sharing site after a series of court rulings against the company.

He went on to establish several other Dot-com companies and Internet startups. He co-founded and served as C.T.O. of TrustedID Inc., a defunct identity theft protection company, and Logictier. His most recent venture was the launch of SynCH Energy Corp, a company whose goal is to convert greenhouse gases released from sewage treatment plants into fuel for automobiles.

=== Philanthropy ===
Ahmad's philanthropic causes included the National Youth Science Foundation. He served as the executive director of American Muslims Intent on Learning and Activism (AMILA). Ahmad was also a contributor and speaker at TED during its conferences.

=== Political career ===
Ahmad was elected to the city council of San Carlos, California, in 2007. He was chosen as Mayor of San Carlos by the city council in November 2010, serving in that office until his death in 2011.

Ahmad is credited with helping to eliminate San Carlos' $3.5 million budget deficit in 2010. At the time of Ahmad's death, the city had a $400,000 budget surplus in May 2011, ending eleven years of cuts and deficits.

In addition to elected office, Ahmad served as the vice chairman of the board of directors for Caltrain, the commuter rail in the San Francisco Bay area, and a board member of SamTrans.

=== Death ===
Omar Ahmad suffered a heart attack at his home in San Carlos, California, on the morning of May 10, 2011. He was taken to Sequoia Hospital, in Redwood City, California, where he was pronounced dead upon arrival at the age of 46. He was survived by his parents, Dr. Iftikhar and Nadira Ahmad, and two sisters, Leah Berry and Fataima Warner.
