= William Y. Anderson =

Swedish-born American fighter ace (1921–2011)

William Yngve Anderson
- Nickname: Willie
- Born: William Yngve Anderson; June 28, 1921; Kramfors, Sweden
- Died: May 9, 2011 (aged 89) Chicago, Illinois, United States
- Allegiance: United States
- Branch: United States Army Air Forces
- Service years: 1942–1945
- Rank: Captain
- Conflicts: World War II
- Awards: Silver Star; Distinguished Flying Cross (2); Air Medal (13); Croix de guerre (France)
- Other work: Commercial pilot United Airlines

William Yngve Anderson (June 28, 1921 – May 9, 2011) was a Swedish-born American fighter ace of World War II, credited with seven official victories in Europe while flying P-51 Mustang fighters with the United States Army Air Forces.

== Biography ==
Anderson was born in Kramfors, Sweden, on June 28, 1921. In 1922, Anderson's family emigrated from Sweden to Chicago. Anderson joined the United States Army Air Forces in September 1941. After completion of training in 1943, he was stationed at RAF Boxted, near London, on "Diver" patrols, defending London from V-1 flying bombs.

Anderson shot down a V-1 on June 17, 1944, and it is possible but not confirmed that he shot down more V-1s. His official tally of 7, however, does not include V-1s, as shooting down pilotless aircraft did not officially count towards his victory tally.

Official victories:

- 13 April 1944 one Focke-Wulf Fw 190
- 28 May 1944 one Messerschmitt Bf 109
- 21 June 1944 two Messerschmitt Me 410s
- 1 August 1944 one Bf 109
- 7 August 1944 two Bf 109s
