= Donald Krim =

American film distributor

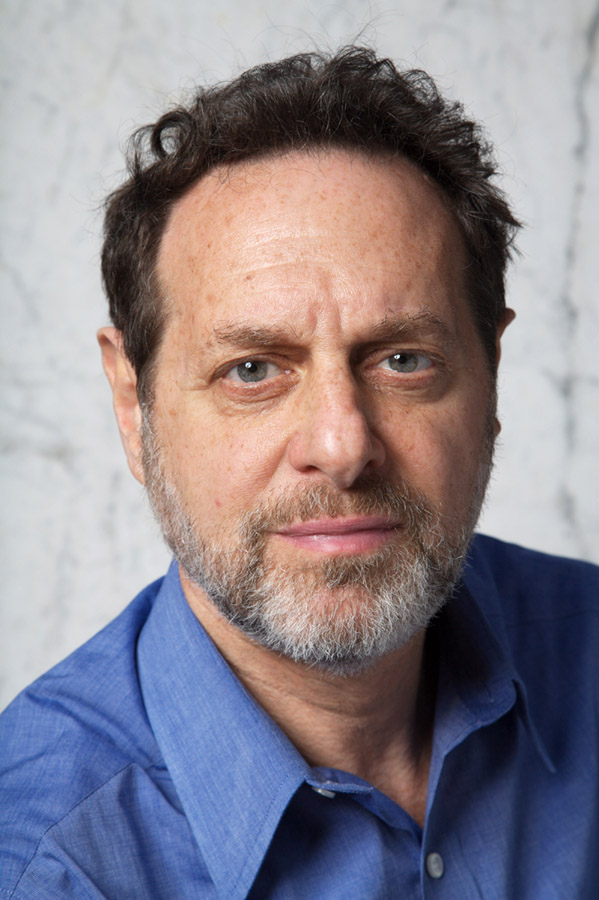
Donald Krim

Donald Barron Krim (October 5, 1945 – May 20, 2011) was an American film distributor. He bought Kino International in 1977 and thereafter served as the company's president until his death of cancer in Manhattan at the age of 65 in 2011.

As the President of Kino International, Krim helped introduce some of the world's most revered film directors to American audiences; among many others, Wong Kar-Wai (Happy Together; Fallen Angels); Michael Haneke (The Piano Teacher); Amos Gitai (Kippur; Kadosh); Aki Kaurismäki (The Match Factory Girl; Ariel); Julie Dash (Daughters of the Dust); and Andrei Zvyagintsev (The Return).

Krim was born in Newton, Massachusetts. He received his bachelor's degree in American history from Columbia University in 1967 and obtained his law degree, also from Columbia, in 1971. After law school, he began his career at United Artists, first becoming head of the 16mm nontheatrical film rental division, then working on the formation of United Artists Classics, the first major studio-owned, art house division—and the model for today's Fox Searchlight and Sony Pictures Classics.

In 2000, Krim received the Mel Novikoff Award from the San Francisco International Film Festival, for his work to "enhance the filmgoing public's knowledge and appreciation of world cinema;" and in 2006, he was the recipient of the prestigious William K. Everson Award for Film History, given by the National Board of Review. On that same year, the Anthology Film Archives bestowed Krim with a Film Preservation Honors Award. In 2009, he received "The Visionary Award" at the 24th Annual Israel Film Festival.

In addition, Krim was personally responsible for all aspects of two re-releases of two different restorations of Fritz Lang's Metropolis—one in 2002, marking the film's 75th anniversary, and the other in 2010, triggered by a major archival discovery. Other classic reissues he helped to make viable include Alexander Korda's The Thief of Bagdad; the first reissue of Pandora's Box and Diary of a Lost Girl; Von Stroheim's Queen Kelly; the 50th anniversary restoration of Bicycle Thieves; and recent high-def restorations of Sergei Eisenstein's Battleship Potemkin and Albert Parker's The Black Pirate.

It was announced in December 2009 that Kino International had merged with Lorber HT Digital to form a new corporate entity, Kino Lorber, Inc. Together with Lorber President Richard Lorber, Krim served as Co-President of the new company until his death in 2011.
