= Matej Čurko =

Slovak murderer, cannibal and suspected serial killer (1968-2011)

- Born: 1968; Czechoslovakia
- Died: May 12, 2011 (aged 42–43); Kysak, Košice Region, Slovakia
- Cause of death: Gunshot wound
- Other names: "The Slovak Cannibal" "kanibm" "Orion218"

Details
- Victims: 2–3+
- Span of crimes: 2009–2011
- Country: Slovakia
- State: Košice
- Date apprehended: Killed before apprehension

Matej Čurko (1968 – May 12, 2011), known as The Slovak Cannibal, was a Slovak murderer, cannibal and suspected serial killer. He was killed by police after attempting to entice a Swiss man to his death. Upon investigation, it was discovered that he had killed and eaten two suicidal women who had volunteered themselves to be murdered. Soon afterwards, police from Italy announced that the killer could be responsible for the disappearance of an Italian woman aged 25 to 28.

== Early life ==
Matej Čurko was born via C-section as one of two sons to a fairly average family, but his parents divorced at a young age. Čurko and his brother, who were not close, were looked after by their mother and grandmother, although they kept in regular contact with their father. Čurko had no recorded illness or injuries at preschool age and passed kindergarten without complications. He even attended a school for mathematically gifted pupils since he was skilled in technical areas.

He was not popular at school, but neither was he bullied or humiliated. Čurko's hobbies were mostly solitary ones, including cycling, playing guitar or drums, using computers and programming them. He was described as a rebel and provocateur by his teachers, as he had trouble keeping respect for the authorities. At age 13, he attacked his 11-year-old neighbor with a knife, causing the boy serious injuries. This incident got the young Čurko transferred to a psychiatric clinic in Košice, where he spent more than a month. After that, he was treated at the Children's Psychiatric Hospital in Hraničné, where intellectual tests showed that he had an above-average IQ of 116.

=== Adulthood ===
After completing elementary school, Čurko successfully completed a vocational school with a GCSE before being drafted into the army as a technical specialist, which he also finished without any issues. After returning from the army, Čurko sought employment in the technical industry, and also gained interest in two new hobbies: firearms and martial arts. Eventually, he gained employment as the head of the IT department of an unnamed insurance company. Most peculiarly, he devoted a lot of his time to filing criminal complaints to the Public Prosecutor's Office, which concerned matters ranging from parking issues to high-grade politics.

What struck people as odd concerning Čurko was that he never showed interest in the opposite sex, only finding a partner at age 30, with whom he had two children. Psychiatrists and psychologists later proposed that he showed numerous signs of psychopathy (dislike towards social contact, preference for solitude, emotional coldness, weak empathy, inability to express his feelings and conflict with authority), and likely suffered from necrophilic sadism and a schizoid personality disorder.

== Modus Operandi and proven murders ==
At the time of the murders, Čurko lived in Sokoľ, and regularly traveled to the Kysak forest, where he would meet and subsequently kill the victims. He met them mainly through suicide forums, using the handle "Orion218". The victims, most of whom had suicidal tendencies and openly professed their desire to end their lives, voluntarily agreed to be killed by the cannibal. The procedure involved the pair meeting in the forest, where Čurko would drug the victim before stabbing them in the heart. Afterwards, he would cut up the body using a meat cleaver or one of his many knives, and mask the odor of rotten flesh using pepper. Then, at his pleasure, he would eat whatever part of the body he desired, storing the rest in his refrigerator in Kysak and burying the bodies in shallow graves on his property.

During the search of his property, only two bodies were discovered: those of 30-year-old Elena Gudjaková, from Oravské Veselé, who went missing on June 23, 2010, and the other of 20-year-old Lucia Uchnárová, from Snina, who went missing on September 3, 2010. Both women had mental health issues, with Uchnárová previously attempting suicide in 2008, and both had contacted Čurko through the Internet. Their bodies were later found in shallow graves on Čurko's property.

== Discovery and death ==
In the spring of 2011, a young Swiss man by the name of Markus Dubach, who had contemplated suicide due to bullying at his work place, posted an ad on the cannibal site where he asked for somebody to kill and eat him. Originally intended as a joke, he was surprised to be contacted by Čurko, who made an offer to do the job. Overtaken by curiosity, Dubach kept in contact with his anonymous would-be killer, even sending him pictures of his legs and buttocks to show his athletic build. Much to Markus' shock, Čurko actually sent him pictures showcasing female body parts, as well as human meat being cooked in a pan. After this, he decided to contact the Swiss authorities, who did not believe him at first, but quickly changed their mind after seeing the messages between the two.

The case was transferred over to their Slovak colleagues, and a special agent was quickly assigned to take Dubach's place in their meeting. Special armed forces were stationed around the meeting area, including a professional sniper, as information obtained by police suggested that the man was armed and very dangerous. Not long after, a man approached the agent. As he had a very casual appearance, he was mistaken for a tourist at first, but the man revealed himself to be the actual cannibal. At that moment, Čurko was ordered to stand down, but instead grabbed a gun from his belt and opened fire upon the agent, hitting him in the chest area. Čurko himself was also hit, his wound proving fatal after falling into a coma.

In September 2017, Markus Dubach travelled to Slovakia, where he gave an interview to the newspaper Novy Cas, in which he told details about his encounter and his book about it.

The full story is told in the book "Die Entscheidung - Begegnung mit einem Kannibalen", which the author Markus Dubach has published on 26 November 2017.

== Investigation ==
While examining his backpack, the police discovered a wide variety of items which could be used to kill a person: three bottles of vodka, a folding knife, packs of black pepper (presumably to mask the smell), plastic bags, linen, latex gloves, zip ties, a large knife and a handsaw. Not long after, Čurko's house was searched, where they found several legally-owned weapons, a large number of cartridges, several mobile phones and his computer. An examination of the computer revealed GPS location of two bodies, and an arranged meeting with a 22-year-old man from the Czech Republic. The body locations were later found, with the corpses lacking their heads, legs, breasts and parts of their muscles. They were later identified as Gudjaková and Uchnárová.

A ceremonial altar was also found in the woods, where it is supposed that Čurko cooked and ate body parts. It is unclear if it had any ritualistic purpose, and it was later destroyed by authorities in order to avoid it becoming a sacred site for "sickos".

== Other victims ==
Officially, two victims have been confirmed: Lucia Uchnárová from Snina, and Elena Gudjaková from Oravské Veselé. In the conversation with Dubach, Curko mentioned a female victim from 2009. If the information is correct, there should be another victim, as the known ones disappeared in 2010.

Curko also mentioned that the 2009 victim was his first, which would mean that Curko killed three people. However, this is doubtful, as he attacked a child at the age of 13.

== Connection to Italy ==
The e-mail communication between Curko and Dubach referred to an Italian woman. Dubach sent Curko a picture showing the severed head of a woman. Curko replied that it was an Italian woman and that he had seen her being murdered. He was unable to give any further details about the victim and could not remember when the crime was supposed to have happened. He obtained the information from the Internet.

Based on articles in different newspapers, the rumor spread that one of Curko's victims was from Italy. A connection was made to an unidentified female body discovered in a field near Rome. This connection was never confirmed.

== What did the victims know? ==
The media spread the claim that Curko's victims had agreed to a cannibalism pact. The fact is that the contact was made via suicide forums and Curko merely offered to kill the victims painlessly. There is no evidence that the victims knew that parts of their bodies would be eaten after their death. For example, there is not a single reference to cannibalism in the chat protocol with Lucia Uchnárová.

Cannibalism is explicitly mentioned only in the conversation with Dubach. But Markus Dubach was not looking for someone to kill and eat him. The contact came about by chance after Dubach began researching cannibalism in Europe on the basis of an article in GEO magazine and then came across a macabre advertisement on the internet. He thought the "offer" made there was a nasty joke. When he realized how serious it was, he contacted the police.

As things stand, Markus Dubach is the only victim who knew that Curko was a cannibal.

== See also ==
- Armin Meiwes
- List of incidents of cannibalism
- List of serial killers by country
