= Ronald H. Miller =

Ron Miller
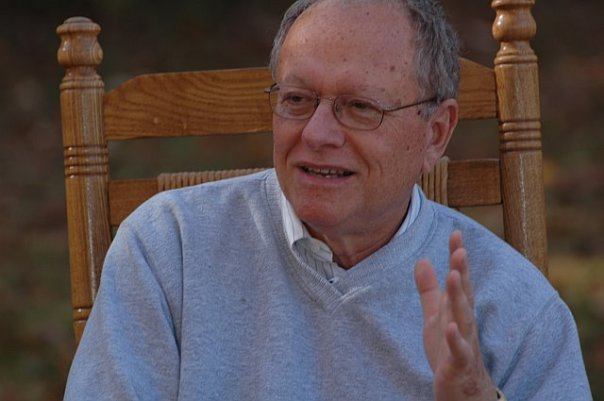
- Born: April 17, 1938; St. Louis, MO, U.S.
- Died: May 4, 2011 (aged 73); New York, NY
- Website: http://www.RonMillersWorld.org/

Ronald H. Miller (April 17, 1938 – May 4, 2011) was professor of the Religion Department at Lake Forest College in Illinois. Miller earned a Ph.D. in Comparative Religions from Northwestern University, and a B.S and M.A from St. Louis University. He was a co-founder and co-director of Common Ground, an active adult education group for interfaith study and dialogue founded in 1975. Miller was vice-president of the Interreligious Engagement Project 21 and board member at Hands-of-Peace, an organization that brings American, and Palestinian and Israeli teenagers from the Middle East together for a two-week program in the United States. Miller lectured at countless churches, temples, mosques and centers across the country and wrote books aimed at a popular audience that convey contemporary issues in New Testament studies as well as in spirituality and philosophy.

== The Hidden Gospel of Matthew ==
In 2004, Miller retranslated and wrote an extensive commentary on the Gospel of Matthew, entitled The Hidden Gospel of Matthew: Annotated and Explained. Miller found Matthew to be written about 60 years after the death of Jesus (or Jeshu, as he translates it). By noting the differences between Jeshu's sayings as they are recorded in the Gospel of Mark and in Matthew, Miller attempted to decode the author's agenda and to recover the original meaning of Jeshu's sayings. Miller found the cherished Christian stories of the virgin birth, the Last Supper, and the resurrection to be largely "Christian Midrash" — sermons preaching Matthew's theological agenda to particular Christian groups in the first century. Miller suggested that Matthew's agenda is to disseminate the idea that the Jews are responsible for rejecting Jeshu. Miller saw Jeshu as a mystic whose nondual consciousness has been spiritually transformed and whose teachings can lead to the transformation of our consciousness and lead us to live non-violently.

== The Gospel of Thomas ==
In his more personal book The Gospel of Thomas: A Guidebook for Spiritual Practice, Miller comments on many of the sayings of Jesus from the Gospel of Thomas. In interpreting these often gnomic sayings, he finds that a consistent – if post-rational – spiritual message is contained in them. Miller distinguishes sharply between traditional dogmatic Christians and the followers of the Jesus of the Gospel of Thomas. He calls followers of the spirituality that he envisions Thomas Christians Miller believes that the gospel was written by a member of the followers of Thomas in the early Jesus Movement. This, he believes, occurred even before the Jesus Movement had been separated from Judaism.

== Death ==
Miller was traveling and had just given a talk at Union Theological Seminary in the City of New York. He had not been feeling well and after his talk, went to his hotel to get some rest before his flight the next morning. Just a few hours before his scheduled departure, Miller was found in his hotel room and pronounced dead at the scene. The autopsy revealed that he died of a heart arrhythmia. His final talk was recorded and can be viewed on his website here: Paul’s Letters and Jewish-Christian Dialogue

Miller had two memorial services: one on May 11 in Deerfield, IL and another on May 22 in Vernon Hills, IL. The event on May 22 had been planned as a fundraiser and celebration of his life while he was still alive. The Gala's invitations, sent out in March, were titled "Join Us in a RONderful Celebration." Those close to Miller decided to keep this Gala event on the calendar to honor him as planned. Miller's body was cremated and his ashes spread by a particular tree near his former office at Lake Forest College, as per his wishes. A memorial "meditation space" was built near this tree at Lake Forest College and was completed in the spring of 2012. A plaque marking this space reads:

The Ron Miller Meditation Space -- Pause, listen, become a more spiritual adult.
Unsere Liebe zu dir ist unsterblich, Ron's Family & Friends 2011

== Bibliography ==
=== Books ===
- Dialogue and Disagreement: Franz Rosenzweig's Contribution to Jewish-Christian Dialogue, 1989
- The Wisdom of the Carpenter, 2001, 2003, 2011
- The Hidden Gospel of Matthew: Annotated and Explained, Skylight Paths Publishing, 2004
- The Gospel of Thomas: a Guidebook for Spiritual Practice, 2004
- Healing the Jewish-Christian Rift: Growing Beyond Our Wounded History, 2005 (with Laura Bernstein)
- Sacred Writings of Paul: Selections Annotated and Explained Skylight Paths Publishing (April 2007) ISBN 1-59473-213-2 ISBN 978-1594732133
- Unpacking the Parables: The Wisdom Teachings of Jesus, 2011
- William James’ Revolution: A New Perspective on “The Varieties of Religious Experience”, 2011

=== Articles ===
- "Thomas Merton: Pioneer of Pluralism", accepted for publication for a book entitled Thomas Merton and the Jews
- "Space for Spirit", Finding a Way, edited by L. Zirker, Tuttle, 1996
- "Pilgrimage Without End", Five Spiritual Journeys, edited by L. Zirker, Iroquois House, 1981
- "The Spirituality of Franz Rosenzweig", Western Spirituality, edited by Matthew Fox, Fides, 1979

== Awards and honors ==
- Deutsche Akademische Austauschdienst Fellowship for the study of philosophy and theology, 1969–1970
- Clement Stone Scholarship for study in Israel, Summer, 1972
- Great Teacher Award, Lake Forest College, 1986
- Bird Award for Intellectual Contributions to the Lake Forest College Campus Community, 1993
- Charlotte Simmons Prize for Fostering Beneficial Community Relations with Lake Forest College, 1994
- William R. Bross Professorial Chair in the Religion Department at Lake Forest College, 1995-2011
