= Gunnar Alksnis =

American-Latvian philosopher and theologian

Gunnar Alksnis (July 1, 1931 – May 15, 2011) was a Latvian-American philosopher and theologian who specialized in ethics and the history of philosophy.

== Biography ==
Alksnis was born as Gunārs Alksnis on July 1, 1931, in Riga, the capital of Latvia. His parents were John Edward Alksnis and Elza Alksnis. The Alksnis family came to the United States in 1949. In 1955 Gunnar Alksnis received a Bachelor of divinity degree. One year later he was ordained as a minister of the Evangelical Lutheran Church in America at Trinity Church in Russell County, Kansas. He married Pauline Elizabeth Krug (1933–2014) in 1957. The couple had two children, John Albert and Maria.

In 1965 Gunnar Alksnis received the academic degree of a Master of Sacred Theology. He became Ph.D. at Kansas State University after submitting a thesis on the critique of rationalism in the German Lebensphilosophie in 1970. In 1968 Gunnar Alksnis was appointed Professor at Washburn University in Topeka, Kansas. For more than 30 years he taught history of philosophy and theology.

After his retirement in 2000 Gunnar and Pauline Alksnis moved to Woodland, California. He continued to write and actively worked for churches in woodland and Davis giving lectures on Martin Luther and the Reformation. His articles touch upon a diversity of topics including history, religion and philosophy. He died on May 15, 2011, in Woodland.

== Research interests ==
Gunnar Alksnis was interested in the history of Actuarial science. He was a specialist on August Zillmer (1831–1893), who first proposed the variation of preliminary term reserves in 1863. Alksnis was most interested in the philosophy of Ludwig Klages who drew a distinction between life-affirming Seele (soul) and life-destroying Geist (spirit/mind) as the forces of "modern, industrial, and intellectual rationalization." Four years after Alksnis death his PhD thesis from 1970 was finally published under the title Chthonic Gnosis. Ludwig Klages and his Quest for the Pandaemonic All. Gunnar Alksnis tried to explain history through biography, because he thought that the unsurpassed way to comprehend an era is to understand the life and profiles of its leaders.

== Honours ==
In memory of Gunnar Alksnis Washburn University established the “Prof. Gunnar Alksnis History Scholarship”. This scholarship is awarded to students “with demonstrated enthusiasm for scholarly activity in History.“

== Works ==
- Ludwig Klages and His Attack on Rationalism. Kansas State University, 1970
- Controversies Surrounding Zillmer Reserves. (with William Roach). Actuarial Research Clearing House. 1991 Vol. 1.
- August Zillmer, an actuary with less reserve. The Actuary. March 1989 – Volume 23, No. 3
- Chthonic Gnosis. Ludwig Klages and his Quest for the Pandaemonic All. Theion Publishing, 2015

== Sources ==
- Archie J. Bahm: Directory of American Philosophers. Vol. 8. Philosophy Documentation Center, Bowling Green State University, 1976, p. 47
- Daily Democrat: Gunnar Alksnis. Obituary.
