= List of Warriors books =

List of works in a series by Erin Hunter

Warriors is a juvenile fantasy novel series by Erin Hunter, a pseudonym used by multiple authors and illustrators. Warriors has been published since 21 January 2003, starting with Into the Wild. The series encompasses multiple main sub-series, longer "Super Editions", shorter novellas, original English-language manga, and graphic novel adaptations of the main sub-series. The books have received mixed reviews from various critics.

== Main series ==
=== Warriors: The Prophecies Begin (2003–2004) ===
No.	Novel title	Author	Publisher	Date	ISBN
1	Into the Wild	Kate Cary	HarperCollins	21 January 2003	978-0-06-000002-8
2	Fire and Ice	Kate Cary	HarperCollins	1 June 2003	978-0-06-052559-0
3	Forest of Secrets	Cherith Baldry	HarperCollins	14 October 2003	978-0-06-052561-3
4	Rising Storm	Kate Cary	HarperCollins	6 January 2004	978-0-06-052563-7
5	A Dangerous Path	Cherith Baldry	HarperCollins	1 June 2004	978-0-06-052565-1
6	The Darkest Hour	Cherith Baldry	HarperCollins	1 October 2004	978-0-06-000007-3

=== Warriors: The New Prophecy (2005–2006) ===
No.	Novel title	Author	Publisher	Date	ISBN
1	Midnight	Cherith Baldry	HarperCollins	10 May 2005	978-0-06-074451-9
2	Moonrise	Cherith Baldry	HarperCollins	2 August 2005	978-0-06-074452-6
3	Dawn	Kate Cary	HarperCollins	27 December 2005	978-0-06-074457-1
4	Starlight	Cherith Baldry	HarperCollins	4 April 2006	978-0-06-082762-5
5	Twilight	Cherith Baldry	HarperCollins	22 August 2006	978-0-06-082764-9
6	Sunset	Cherith Baldry	HarperCollins	26 December 2006	978-0-06-082769-4

=== Warriors: Power of Three (2007–2009) ===
No.	Novel title	Author	Publisher	Date	ISBN
1	The Sight	Kate Cary	HarperCollins	24 April 2007	978-0-06-089201-2
2	Dark River	Kate Cary	HarperCollins	26 December 2007	978-0-06-089205-0
3	Outcast	Cherith Baldry	HarperCollins	22 April 2008	978-0-06-089208-1
4	Eclipse	Kate Cary	HarperCollins	2 September 2008	978-0-06-236711-2
5	Long Shadows	Cherith Baldry	HarperCollins	25 November 2008	978-0-06-089214-2
6	Sunrise	Cherith Baldry	HarperCollins	21 April 2009	978-0-06-089217-3

=== Warriors: Omen of the Stars (2009–2012) ===
No.	Novel title	Author	Publisher	Date	ISBN
1	The Fourth Apprentice	Cherith Baldry	HarperCollins	24 November 2009	978-0-06-155509-1
2	Fading Echoes	Kate Cary	HarperCollins	6 April 2010	978-0-06-155514-5
3	Night Whispers	Kate Cary	HarperCollins	23 November 2010	978-0-06-238260-3
4	Sign of the Moon	Cherith Baldry	HarperCollins	5 April 2011	978-0-06-155518-3
5	The Forgotten Warrior	Cherith Baldry	HarperCollins	22 November 2011	978-0-06-238262-7
6	The Last Hope	Kate Cary	HarperCollins	3 April 2012	978-0-06-155527-5

=== Warriors: Dawn of the Clans (2013–2015) ===
No.	Novel title	Author	Publisher	Date	ISBN
1	The Sun Trail	Cherith Baldry	HarperCollins	5 March 2013	978-0-06-241000-9
2	Thunder Rising	Cherith Baldry	HarperCollins	5 November 2013	978-0-06-206350-2
3	The First Battle	Kate Cary	HarperCollins	8 April 2014	978-0-06-206353-3
4	The Blazing Star	Cherith Baldry	HarperCollins	4 November 2014	978-0-06-206358-8
5	A Forest Divided	Kate Cary	HarperCollins	7 April 2015	978-0-06-241005-4
6	Path of Stars	Kate Cary	HarperCollins	1 September 2015	978-0-06-206366-3

=== Warriors: A Vision of Shadows (2016–2018) ===
No.	Novel title	Author	Publisher	Date	ISBN
1	The Apprentice's Quest	Cherith Baldry	HarperCollins	15 March 2016	978-0-06-238637-3
2	Thunder and Shadow	Kate Cary	HarperCollins	6 September 2016	978-0-06-238641-0
3	Shattered Sky	Cherith Baldry	HarperCollins	11 April 2017	978-0-06-238647-2
4	Darkest Night	Kate Cary	HarperCollins	7 November 2017	978-0-06-238651-9
5	River of Fire	Cherith Baldry	HarperCollins	10 April 2018	978-0-06-238655-7
6	The Raging Storm	Kate Cary	HarperCollins	6 November 2018	978-0-06-238659-5

=== Warriors: The Broken Code (2019–2021) ===
No.	Novel title	Author	Publisher	Date	ISBN
1	Lost Stars	Cherith Baldry	HarperCollins	9 April 2019	978-0-06-282352-6
2	The Silent Thaw	Kate Cary	HarperCollins	29 October 2019	978-0-06-282358-8
3	Veil of Shadows	Cherith Baldry	HarperCollins	7 April 2020	978-0-06-282369-4
4	Darkness Within	Kate Cary	HarperCollins	10 November 2020	978-0-06-282372-4
5	The Place of No Stars	Cherith Baldry	HarperCollins	6 April 2021	978-0-06-282376-2
6	A Light in the Mist	Kate Cary	HarperCollins	9 November 2021	978-0-06-282388-5

=== Warriors: A Starless Clan (2022–2024) ===
No.	Novel title	Author	Publisher	Date	ISBN
1	River	Cherith Baldry	HarperCollins	5 April 2022	978-0-06-305008-2
2	Sky	Kate Cary	HarperCollins	1 November 2022	978-0-06-305015-0
3	Shadow	Cherith Baldry	HarperCollins	4 April 2023	978-0-06-305021-1
4	Thunder	Kate Cary	HarperCollins	7 November 2023	978-0-06-305027-3
5	Wind	Cherith Baldry	HarperCollins	2 April 2024	978-0-06-305033-4
6	Star	Kate Cary	HarperCollins	5 November 2024	978-0-06-305039-6

=== Warriors: Changing Skies (2025–) ===
No.	Novel title	Author	Publisher	Date	ISBN
1	The Elders' Quest	Cherith Baldry	HarperCollins	7 January 2025	978-0-06-335706-8
2	Hidden Moon	Clarissa Hutton	HarperCollins	4 November 2025	978-0-06-335711-2
3	Chasing Shadows	Cherith Baldry	HarperCollins	31 March 2026	978-0-06-335716-7
4	Guiding Light	Rosie Best	HarperCollins	6 October 2026	978-0-06-335721-1
5	False Dawn	Cherith Baldry	HarperCollins	30 March 2027	
6	TBA	TBA	HarperCollins	TBA	

== Standalones ==
=== Super Editions ===
A reviewer for The Mary Sue described Bluestar's Prophecy as "incredibly tragic", and called Bluestar one of her favorite characters. She ranked SkyClan's Destiny, Bluestar's Prophecy, and Firestar's Quest as the tenth, ninth and eighth best Warriors books, respectively.

No.	Super Edition	Author	Publisher	Date	ISBN
1	Firestar's Quest	Cherith Baldry	HarperCollins	21 August 2007	978-0-06-113164-6
2	Bluestar's Prophecy	Kate Cary	HarperCollins	28 July 2009	978-0-06-158250-9
3	SkyClan's Destiny	Cherith Baldry	HarperCollins	3 August 2010	978-0-06-169996-2
4	Crookedstar's Promise	Kate Cary	HarperCollins	5 July 2011	978-0-06-198099-2
5	Yellowfang's Secret	Cherith Baldry	HarperCollins	9 October 2012	978-0-06-208216-9
6	Tallstar's Revenge	Kate Cary	HarperCollins	2 July 2013	978-0-06-221806-3
7	Bramblestar's Storm	Cherith Baldry, Dan Jolley	HarperCollins	26 August 2014	978-0-06-229145-5
8	Moth Flight's Vision	Kate Cary	HarperCollins	3 November 2015	978-0-06-229147-9
9	Hawkwing's Journey	Cherith Baldry	HarperCollins	1 November 2016	978-0-06-246769-0
10	Tigerheart's Shadow	Kate Cary	HarperCollins	5 September 2017	978-0-06-246772-0
11	Crowfeather's Trial	Cherith Baldry	HarperCollins	4 September 2018	978-0-06-269878-0
12	Squirrelflight's Hope	Kate Cary	HarperCollins	3 September 2019	978-0-06-269882-7
13	Graystripe's Vow	Cherith Baldry	HarperCollins	1 September 2020	978-0-06-296302-4
14	Leopardstar's Honor	Kate Cary	HarperCollins	7 September 2021	978-0-06-296306-2
15	Onestar's Confession	Cherith Baldry	HarperCollins	6 September 2022	978-0-06-305045-7
16	Riverstar's Home	Kate Cary	HarperCollins	5 September 2023	978-0-06-305051-8
17	Ivypool's Heart	Cherith Baldry	HarperCollins	3 September 2024	978-0-06-335736-5
18	StormClan's Folly	Conrad Mason	HarperCollins	26 August 2025	978-0-06-335741-9
19	Darktail's Judgment	Clarissa Hutton	HarperCollins	8 September 2026	978-0-06-3459-861
20	Stormfur's Rescue	Conrad Mason	HarperCollins	7 September 2027	

=== Original English-language manga ===
Kirkus Reviews has both praised and criticised the manga. A review of Winds of Change wrote that while the illustrations "give a visual boost for tracking the large cast of characters", the sheer number of characters and series-specific vocabulary could make unfamiliar readers feel "lost". A review of Exile from ShadowClan called it "amazing" and praised the "satisfying ending". However, A Thief in ThunderClan was described as "lackluster", with a "sagging resolution" and a mystery resolved too hastily. School Library Journal wrote that illustrator James L. Barry "has a real knack for drawing cats", but also called the illustrations "a bit basic". Lisa Goldstein, writing for School Library Journal, described that illustrations in The Rise of Sourge are "more detailed than typical manga drawings and effectively bring out the cats' personalities and characters"; she concluded that due to the violence, it is "not a cuddly animal tale". A Clan in Need and SkyClan and the Stranger have both been New York Times Manga Best Sellers in 2009, 2010, and 2011.

No.	Title	Author	Publisher	Date	ISBN
1	Graystripe's Adventure	Dan Jolley (author), James L. Barry (illustrator)	HarperCollins and Tokyopop	6 October 2009, 8 August 2017 (colored)	978-0-06-178228-2
1, part 1	The Lost Warrior	N/A	N/A	24 April 2007	978-0-06-124020-1
1, part 2	Warrior's Refuge	N/A	N/A	26 December 2007	978-0-06-125231-0
1, part 3	Warrior's Return	N/A	N/A	22 April 2008	978-0-06-125233-4
2	The Rise of Scourge	Dan Jolley (author), Bettina M. Kurkoski and Danielle Weires (illustrators)	HarperCollins and Tokyopop	24 June 2008, 12 March 2024 (colored)	978-0-06-335174-5
3	Tigerstar and Sasha	Dan Jolley (author), Don Hudson (illustrator)	HarperCollins and Tokyopop	8 July 2025 (colored)	978-0-06-335176-9
3, part 1	Into the Woods	N/A	N/A	2 September 2008	978-0-06-154792-8
3, part 2	Escape from the Forest	N/A	N/A	23 December 2008	978-0-06-154793-5
3, part 3	Return to the Clans	N/A	N/A	9 June 2009	978-0-06-154794-2
4	Ravenpaw's Path	Dan Jolley (author), James L. Barry (illustrator)	HarperCollins and Tokyopop	26 June 2018 (colored)	978-0-06-274824-9
4, part 1	Shattered Peace	N/A	N/A	24 November 2009	978-0-06-168865-2
4, part 2	A Clan in Need	N/A	N/A	23 March 2010	978-0-06-168866-9
4, part 3	The Heart of a Warrior	N/A	N/A	3 August 2010	978-0-06-168867-6
5	SkyClan and the Stranger	Dan Jolley (author), James L. Barry (illustrator)	HarperCollins and Tokyopop	28 May 2019 (colored)	978-0-06-285737-8
5, part 1	The Rescue	N/A	N/A	5 July 2011	978-0-06-200836-7
5, part 2	Beyond the Code	N/A	N/A	22 November 2011	978-0-06-200837-4
5, part 3	After the Flood	N/A	N/A	3 April 2012	978-0-06-200838-1
6	A Shadow in RiverClan	Dan Jolley (author), James L. Barry (illustrator)	HarperAlley	2 June 2020	978-0-06-294665-2
7	Winds of Change	Dan Jolley (author), James L. Barry (illustrator)	HarperAlley	1 June 2021	978-0-06-304324-4
8	Exile from ShadowClan	Dan Jolley (author), James L. Barry (illustrator)	HarperAlley	7 June 2022	978-0-06-304327-5
9	A Thief in ThunderClan	Dan Jolley (author), James L. Barry (illustrator)	HarperAlley	6 June 2023	978-0-06-324022-3

=== Graphic novels ===
The graphic novel adaptations of The Prophecies Begin have received both praise and criticism from Kirkus Reviews. A review of Volume 1 wrote that the "vivid colors, dramatic action sequences, and appealingly expressive feline faces will grab readers' attention". A review of Volume 2 criticised the difficulty of visually recognising characters, "particularly since the illustrators admit to adding a few extras". A review of Volume 3 described that "the visual format suits the violent, dramatic storyline". School Library Journal stated that the "unique and vibrant colors" would surely "help bring these stories to a new audience".

No.	The Prophecies Begin	Illustrators	Publisher	Date	ISBN
1	Volume 1	Natalie Riess, Sara Goetter	HarperAlley	16 July 2024	978-0-06-320388-4
2	Volume 2	Natalie Riess, Sara Goetter	HarperAlley	8 April 2025	978-0-06-320391-4
3	Volume 3	Natalie Riess, Sara Goetter	HarperAlley	30 September 2025	978-0-06-320394-5

No.	The New Prophecy	Illustrators	Publisher	Date	ISBN
1	Volume 1	Gibson Twist, Sammy Savos	HarperAlley	30 June 2026	978-0-06-3450-905
2	Volume 2	Gibson Twist, Sammy Savos	HarperAlley	March 2027	
3	Volume 3	Gibson Twist, Sammy Savos	HarperAlley	TBA	

=== Novellas ===
No.	Novella	Author	Publisher	Date	ISBN
1	The Untold Stories	Victoria Holmes	HarperCollins	2 July 2013 (Note: The novellas from The Untold Stories to Legends of the Clans were originally published as e-books before being published in physical bind-ups.)	978-0-06-223292-2
2	Tales from the Clans	Victoria Holmes	HarperCollins	4 November 2014	978-0-06-229085-4
3	Shadows of the Clans	Victoria Holmes	HarperCollins	26 January 2016	978-0-06-234332-1
4	Legends of the Clans	Victoria Holmes	HarperCollins	11 April 2017	978-0-06-256087-2
5	Path of a Warrior	Clarissa Hutton	HarperCollins	9 April 2019	978-0-06-279884-8
6	A Warrior's Spirit	Cherith Baldry, Clarissa Hutton	HarperCollins	7 April 2020	978-0-06-285741-5
7	A Warrior's Choice	Clarissa Hutton, Cherith Baldry	HarperCollins	6 April 2021	978-0-06-285743-9

=== Short stories and plays ===
Title	Author	Type	Date
After Sunset: We Need to Talk	Victoria Holmes	Play	April/May 2007
Spottedleaf's Honest Answer	Erin Hunter	Short story	2008
Beyond the Code: Brightspirit's Mercy	Cherith Baldry	Play	2009
The Clans Decide	Victoria Holmes	Short story	2009
After Sunset: The Right Choice?	Victoria Holmes	Short story	30 June 2011
The Elders' Concern	Victoria Holmes	Short story	30 June 2011
A Fear of Fire	Victoria Holmes	Short story	15 December 2021
The Death of Bright Stream	Erin Hunter	Short story	Unknown

=== Field guides ===
No.	Title	Author	Publisher	Date	ISBN
1	Secrets of the Clans	Tui T. Sutherland	HarperCollins	29 May 2007	978-0-06-123903-8
2	Cats of the Clans	Victoria Holmes	HarperCollins	24 June 2008	978-0-06-145856-9
3	Code of the Clans	Victoria Holmes	HarperCollins	9 June 2009	978-0-06-166009-2
4	Battles of the Clans	Victoria Holmes	HarperCollins	1 June 2010	978-0-06-170230-3
5	Enter the Clans	Tui T. Sutherland, Victoria Holmes	HarperCollins	26 June 2012	978-0-06-210239-3
6	Warriors: The Ultimate Guide	Victoria Holmes	HarperCollins	5 November 2013	978-0-06-224533-5
7	The Warriors Guide	Erin Hunter	HarperCollins	31 August 2012	978-1-43-513206-1
8	The Ultimate Guide: Updated and Expanded	Victoria Holmes, Clarissa Hutton	HarperCollins	31 October 2023	978-0-06-314396-8

== See also ==
- Lists of books
