= Warriors: The Prophecies Begin =

First arc in the Warriors series

- Into the Wild (2003); Fire and Ice (2003); Forest of Secrets (2003); Rising Storm (2004); A Dangerous Path (2004); The Darkest Hour (2004)
- Author: Erin Hunter
- Illustrator: Wayne McLoughlin
- Country: United Kingdom
- Language: English
- Genre: Children's literature Fantasy
- Publisher: HarperCollins
- Published: 23 January 2003 – 1 October 2004
- Followed by: Warriors: The New Prophecy

Warriors: The Prophecies Begin, originally known as Warriors, is the first story arc in the Warriors juvenile fantasy novel series about feral cats. The arc comprises six novels which were published from 2003 to 2004: Into the Wild, Fire and Ice, Forest of Secrets, Rising Storm, A Dangerous Path, and The Darkest Hour. The novels are published by HarperCollins under the pseudonym Erin Hunter, which refers to authors Kate Cary and Cherith Baldry and plot developer/editor Victoria Holmes. The sub-series details the adventures of the housecat Rusty, who joins ThunderClan, one of four Clans of feral cats living in a forest which adjoins the human town in which he originally lives. The arc's major themes deal with forbidden love, the concept of nature versus nurture, and characters being a mix of good and evil. Though the novels have appeared on the New York Times Bestseller List and have been nominated for several awards, none of the novels in the Warriors sub-series have won a significant literary award.

== Development ==
Although the original plan was for a stand-alone novel, enough material was created for several books, and the publisher decided upon a six-volume series. Holmes then enlisted the help of another author, Kate Cary, for whom Holmes had previously edited and knew as a cat-lover. Into the Wild was thus written by Kate Cary in about three months under the pseudonym "Erin Hunter". Holmes then began to work behind the scenes, editing and supervising details. HarperCollins requested Holmes to produce a book every three months. Upon hearing this, Holmes invited Cherith Baldry into the team in order to keep up with the schedule. Holmes says she chose Baldry because "her natural writing style was quite close to mine and Kate's, so I knew that Cherith's voice would fit". Afterwards, Holmes began to like the idea of using cats, since she realized how thoughtful they can be in leading private lives without any humans realizing. The series is considered to be fantasy, and has also been labelled an "animal adventure".

With two authors at the time, Holmes decided to publish the books under a pseudonym; having two authors would place the books at different places at libraries, confusing and possibly scaring off potential readers. The last name Hunter was chosen because it put the books next to the Redwall series, which has a similar genre.

Warriors uses a lexicon with different names for certain foreign objects. A Children's Literature review noted the words "kittypet" and "twoleg" which mean housecat and humans respectively. In the book, instead of using "said", Cary uses the word "mewed". For the names, Kate Cary says that she takes in inspiration for the names from "sight, sounds and scents the cats would experience". At the same time, more names become available as the cats' world becomes more diverse.

== Publication history ==
Into the Wild was first published as a hardcover book by HarperCollins on 9 January 2003 in Canada. The book was released on 21 January 2003 in the United States, and in February 2003 in the United Kingdom. Into the Wild was released in paperback form in the US on 6 January 2004. On 4 September 2007, the book was released as an eBook, and on Amazon's Kindle. The book was one of the first to be in HarperCollins' "Browse Inside" program where twenty percent of the novel is available online. For a limited time, the complete novel was also available online. The paperback version sold 150,637 copies in 2008.

Fire and Ice was first published in hardcover by HarperCollins in the US on 27 March 2003. The paperback version was released on 1 June 2004, and an e-book version was released on 9 September 2007. An English Kindle edition is also available. The novel was published in Canada on 20 May 2004, and was released in the United Kingdom in June 2003.

Forest of Secrets was first released in the US as a hardcover on 14 October 2003. It was then released as a paperback on 5 October 2004 and as an e-book on 4 September 2007. Forest of Secrets has also been published in the UK as a hardcover and paperback and in Canada as a paperback.

Rising Storm was first published as a hardcover in the US on 6 January 2004. The book was later published as a paperback on 15 February 2005 and as an e-book on 4 September 2007. In the UK, the book was first released on 2 October 2006 as a paperback. The Canadian version released early on 8 January 2004.

A Dangerous Path was first published in the US as a hardcover on 1 June 2004. It was then published as a paperback on 24 May 2005 and an e-book on 13 October 2009. A Dangerous Path was also published in the UK as a paperback on 2 April 2007 and in Canada as a hardcover on 20 May 2004.

The Darkest Hour was first released in the US on 5 October 2004, as a hardcover. It was later released as a paperback on 4 October 2005, and as an e-book on 4 September 2007.

== Setting and characters ==
In the Warriors universe, there are four Clans of feral cats that live in a forest: ThunderClan, RiverClan, WindClan, and ShadowClan. Each Clan is adapted to its own types of prey and members usually possess (or are taught) special skills which suit the territory's terrain. The authors based the forest on the New Forest in southern England. In addition to the New Forest, Loch Lomond, the Scottish Highlands, and the Forest of Dean inspired the fictional locales in the novel. BloodClan is a group of stray city cats introduced in The Darkest Hour. This group of cats is not considered to be a true Clan because they do not believe in the warriors' spiritual ancestors, StarClan, or the warrior code, a set of rules followed by all Clan cats. BloodClan cats are thus seen as a group of rogues (non-Clan cats who do not respect the Clan cats' rules).

StarClan is a group of all of the Clans' deceased ancestors who gives guidance to the Clans. After death, most Clan cats join StarClan. StarClan is said to be represented by Silverpelt (the Milky Way), and each individual star represents the spirit of a single dead warrior. Their guidance to the Clans is often given through dreams and other signs and omens. Often, this occurs when medicine cats go every half-moon to the Moonstone, a large piece of quartz in an abandoned mine, to communicate with StarClan. In an author chat, Hunter said that StarClan can "just get glimpses of" the future, which they occasionally pass on.

== Synopsis ==
Warriors: The Prophecies Begin follows a pet cat named Rusty who dreams about the forest that lies beyond the neighbourhood he lives in. One day, he ventures into the forest and is invited to join ThunderClan, one of four groups of wild cats in the forest. He accepts the invitation and receives the apprentice name Firepaw. Later, Firepaw receives his warrior name, Fireheart, and discovers that Tigerclaw, the deputy of ThunderClan, wishes to kill ThunderClan's leader Bluestar in order to succeed her and become leader himself. Eventually, Fireheart becomes deputy of the Clan after Tigerclaw tries to kill Bluestar, fails, and is banished from ThunderClan. Bluestar later dies, sacrificing her life to protect the Clan from dogs sent by Tigerclaw, now Tigerstar, who became the leader of ShadowClan after his banishment. Fireheart then becomes the leader, receiving nine lives and the name Firestar. Tigerstar then attempts to take over all four Clans, telling them that the leaders will rule together. Leopardstar, leader of RiverClan, agrees, but Firestar and Tallstar, leader of WindClan, refuse. Tigerstar tries to use BloodClan, a vicious group of city cats, to take over the Clans, but BloodClan leader Scourge kills Tigerstar (taking all nine of Tigerstar's lives at once by slicing him from neck to tail) and decides to take over the forest for himself. The four Clans unite and fight BloodClan. Firestar loses the first of his nine lives in battle against Scourge, but he kills Scourge after returning to life, defeating BloodClan, and saving the forest.

=== Into the Wild ===
ThunderClan's medicine cat, Spottedleaf, receives a prophecy from the spirits of their ancestors, StarClan, stating that "Fire alone can save our Clan." Rusty, a house cat, runs into a ThunderClan apprentice, Graypaw, in his backyard. Bluestar and Lionheart, Graypaw's mentor, watch Rusty's reaction: he does not run away, but instead fights back against Graypaw. This leads them to invite Rusty to join ThunderClan. Though Rusty accepts, he is not welcomed by most of the Clan on account of his past life as a housecat. Rusty loses his collar after a fight, and Bluestar gives Rusty a new name: Firepaw. He forms a strong bond with fellow apprentices Graypaw and Ravenpaw, but discovers that Tigerclaw, an ambitious member of the Clan, murdered the previous deputy in an attempt to become Clan leader. Tigerclaw realizes that his apprentice, Ravenpaw, watched the murder and might spill the secret, so he plans to kill Ravenpaw. To prevent this from happening, Firepaw and Graypaw lead Ravenpaw to a barn outside Clan territory where he is safe and has company, living with a loner named Barley. Tigerclaw realizes Firepaw knows his secret, but is still trusted by the Clan. A few days later, Frostfur's kits are stolen by the ShadowClan leader and his warriors. Firepaw leads a rescue party to search for the lost kits in ShadowClan territory and emerges victorious. As the kits were reclaimed because of Firepaw, Bluestar gives Firepaw his warrior name, Fireheart, along with making Graypaw a warrior, giving him the name Graystripe.

=== Fire and Ice ===
Fire and Ice begins with Fireheart and Graystripe performing a traditional silent vigil after their promotion to warrior status in Into the Wild. Fireheart and Graystripe are then tasked with locating WindClan, which had been driven out of their territory. They find the cats under a tangle of Thunderpaths (roads), and succeed in bringing them home. During a hunting patrol, Graystripe almost drowns after chasing a vole onto thin ice and falling in the river separating RiverClan and ThunderClan. He is rescued by Silverstream, a RiverClan warrior, with whom he falls in love. This inter-clan love is against the warrior code, a code of honor that all warriors must follow. Fireheart discovers their relationship, and unsuccessfully attempts to discourage them from seeing each other.

Tigerclaw sets a trap for Bluestar by the Thunderpath, intending to kill her, and thus bringing him closer to becoming leader. Instead, apprentice Cinderpaw gets hit by a monster (cars) and becomes crippled with a permanent limp. This prevents her from becoming a warrior, so she trains under Yellowfang to become a medicine cat.

Fireheart is reunited with his sister, Princess, a kittypet living in a Twolegplace (a human town). Princess gives Fireheart her oldest kit, Cloudkit, to take into the Clan as a new apprentice. Although Fireheart agrees to accept the kit, his Clanmates, with the exception of Frostfur and Graystripe, are reluctant to accept him because of his kittypet blood.

=== Forest of Secrets ===
Fireheart is determined to uncover the truth about the Clan deputy, Tigerclaw, whom he believes is untrustworthy. To do this, he must risk losing the trust of his leader, Bluestar, as she might suspect Fireheart himself as a traitor.

Meanwhile, Fireheart's best friend, Graystripe, risks the trust of his entire Clan as he continues having a forbidden love affair with Silverstream, who is from RiverClan. Silverstream eventually dies while giving birth to Graystripe's kits when they come early. ThunderClan then learns about his forbidden love with Silverstream and feel that they cannot trust Graystripe anymore.

Later, Tigerclaw leads a band of rogues into ThunderClan camp, pretending to defend the Clan. During the battle, Tigerclaw corners Bluestar in her den and tries to kill her. Fireheart arrives just in time to save her, and Tigerclaw is defeated. Bluestar is deeply shocked and shaken by Tigerclaw's mutiny, though she manages to announce his exile from the Clan. With Bluestar having regained her trust over the cat that had exposed Tigerclaw's treachery, Fireheart is made deputy. The announcement of the position is made after moonhigh, which is against Clan tradition. Fireheart is unsure whether he will be a good deputy, but he is sure that he has not seen the last of Tigerclaw.

=== Rising Storm ===
Fireheart is now ThunderClan's new deputy, but the previous deputy, Tigerclaw, still haunts Fireheart's dreams. Bluestar also begins to become distrustful of the Clan after Tigerclaw's betrayal.

One day, Bluestar, accompanied by Fireheart, goes to speak with StarClan at Mothermouth, an abandoned quarry mine. On the way there, a patrol of WindClan warriors, led by Mudclaw, stop them before Bluestar is able to explain why they are trespassing. The ThunderClan leader later fears that StarClan sent WindClan to stop them from going to Mothermouth and speaking with StarClan, which causes her to slip into further paranoia.

In the summer months, Fireheart struggles with his disrespectful nephew and apprentice, Cloudpaw, who goes to a Twoleg (human) for food and is one day abducted by them. Fireheart and Sandstorm rescue Cloudpaw, who is found near the barn where Ravenpaw and Barley live. Cloudpaw is accepted back into the Clan, since Fireheart keeps it a secret that Cloudpaw went to humans for food.

Meanwhile, the forest gets hotter and hotter, and a fire sweeps through the forest, destroying ThunderClan's camp and taking the lives of two elders, Patchpelt and Halftail, as well as Yellowfang, ThunderClan's medicine cat. At the end of the book, it was revealed at a Gathering of Clans that both Nightstar and Cinderfur of ShadowClan have died from a sickness, and that Tigerstar is the new leader of ShadowClan.

=== A Dangerous Path ===
When a pack of dogs begins to run wild in the forest, Fireheart, deputy of ThunderClan, suspects that Tigerstar, ShadowClan's new leader, is behind it. To find out, he asks Brightpaw, who gets mauled by the dogs, if she remembers what happened. Brightpaw can only remember the words "Pack, pack, kill, kill". A trail of dead rabbits is then found leading to the camp, ending with Brindleface in front of the camp, who had been killed by Tigerstar. Brindleface's death shocks everyone, and after her burial, the Clan is evacuated from their camp to Sunningrocks. Fireheart and the senior warriors decide that a patrol of cats will attempt to lead the dogs over the edge of a nearby gorge, drowning the dogs. The plan works: each cat successfully leads the pack closer to the gorge. Fireheart, the last in line, keeps a good distance between him and the pack leader, until Tigerstar appears and pins Fireheart down. As the dog leader gets dangerously close, Tigerstar leaps away, leaving Fireheart to be killed by the pack. As Fireheart struggles against the dog, Bluestar slams into the dog, who releases its grip on Fireheart. The dog and Bluestar are thrown over the side of the gorge.

Fireheart leaps down the cliff to the river and dives in to save Bluestar. Bluestar's secret RiverClan children, Stonefur and Mistyfoot, discover Fireheart struggling in the river and help drag Bluestar to the bank. There, Bluestar pleads with her kits to forgive her for lying to them about their parents, and they forgive her. Bluestar then tells Fireheart that he is now the leader of ThunderClan, and that "you are the fire that saved my Clan". After fulfilling the prophecy told by Spottedleaf in Into the Wild, she loses her final life.

Fireheart is filled with grief, and Mistyfoot asks if she and Stonefur can help carry her back to camp and sit vigil for her.

=== The Darkest Hour ===
Firestar is now the leader of ThunderClan, and he receives his nine lives from StarClan. During this process, Bluestar tells him the prophecy "Four will become two, Lion and Tiger will meet in battle and blood will rule the forest." Tigerstar then attempts to unify all four Clans claiming that it would help the Clans survive. While Leopardstar of RiverClan agrees, Tallstar of WindClan and Firestar both refuse to join this alliance, which Tigerstar has called "TigerClan". Accompanied by Ravenpaw, who is on a visit to ThunderClan, Graystripe and Firestar go to RiverClan and find that Graystripe's kits, Stormpaw and Featherpaw, and Bluestar's kits, Mistyfoot and Stonefur, are being held prisoner as traitors due to their half-Clan blood. Firestar, Graystripe, and Ravenpaw manage to rescue Mistyfoot, Stormpaw, and Featherpaw, but Stonefur is brutally killed while protecting Featherpaw and Stormpaw.

In an attempt to convince Tallstar and Firestar to join his alliance, Tigerstar reveals to them his alliance with BloodClan, a vicious group of rogues in the nearby town. When both leaders still refuse, Tigerstar orders BloodClan to fight for him, but they do not do so. Scourge tells Tigerstar that he is the only cat in charge of BloodClan, and after Firestar tells everyone of Tigerstar's bloodthirsty history, and that he cannot be trusted to divide power, Scourge decides that there will be no battle. Enraged, Tigerstar attacks Scourge, but Scourge slays him easily by cutting him open from chin to tail, ending all nine of Tigerstar's lives at once. Scourge then gives all of the forest Clans three days to leave; otherwise, they will have to fight BloodClan to remain in the forest. To face this danger, the four Clans unite, forming an alliance which is known as "LionClan". The battle is won when Firestar kills Scourge, though he loses one of his own nine lives in the process. Without its leader, BloodClan scatters. With the forest returned to normal, the four Clans become independent once more.

== Themes ==
A prominent theme in the series is that of forbidden love. One of the most drastic examples of this is when Graystripe falls in love with Silverstream, who is in another Clan. This inter-clan relationship between cats is forbidden by the warrior code. Non-belief, as when Cloudtail does not believe in StarClan, is also significant in the storyline. On the other hand, Holmes said that another central theme of the series is "faith and spirituality" in StarClan. All books in the series heavily feature the influence of StarClan, not just as the cats think of them, but also in terms of prophecies delivered by StarClan which inevitably come true. Thus the existence of an afterlife and the influence of spirits who have passed on and yet retain their earthly identities is integral to the plot.

Another theme notes that characters can be a mix of good and evil. Holmes has said that she is fascinated by these "shades of gray" in personalities. Her example of this was when Bluestar, an outwardly noble and honourable cat, gave up her kits, thus fueling her own ambitions and preventing an evil cat from taking power. Another example she gave of this is how Tigerstar, despite all of his faults, is still courageous and fiercely loyal. Similarly, Holmes has also connected the theme to Brambleclaw and how nobody knew whether he was good or evil. A third major theme, often referred to as nature versus nurture, explores whether a cat is born with a set destiny, or if other things can shape their future. This theme ties into the "shades of gray" theme.

A reviewer for Publishers Weekly noted that friendship and responsibility are taught to characters in the novels, while booksforyouths.com had a reviewer who pointed out the idea that, just as Clan cats shun house cats for their soft life, people should realise that it is necessary to experience hardships in life. A Storysnoops review noted that one of the themes was that "it doesn't matter where you come from, only who you are inside". Other themes that have been pointed out deal with family, loss, honour, bravery, death, loyalty, and following rules.

Holmes also dealt with human themes such as "starting at a new school (Rusty joining ThunderClan),... being bullied by someone who should look after you (Tigerclaw bullying Ravenpaw)", and fitting in. Holmes has said that one of the good things about writing a book about cats is that "we can tackle difficult human issues such as death, racial intolerance, and religious intolerance [without seeming so heavy]".

Another theme dealt with is power: this is explored in the character of Tigerclaw, who is determined to take over ThunderClan even after being banished from the Clan for trying to do so. Booklist notes that "teens may find their own journey toward adulthood echoed in the protagonist's struggles and self-doubts".

A Bookloons reviewer notes that The Darkest Hour "stresses the importance of caring and community". This is shown to be true as the Clans need to work together in order to defeat BloodClan despite normally being enemies with one another.

== Critical reception ==
The first book of the series, Into the Wild, was generally well-received, with reviewers calling it a "spine-tingling", "thoroughly engrossing" and an "exciting ... action-packed adventure". One reviewer praised the authors for "creating an intriguing world ... and an engaging young hero", although the number of characters was seen as "a little confusing". The characters have been called "true to their feline nature", with the realism including a fair amount of violence.

The cats and their imagined world have also been criticised as "neither ... consistent nor compelling" as well as "somewhat flat" and "limited essentially to each individual's function within the clan". Another reviewer criticized the use of "'he mewed', 'she purred', and 'the warrior mewed', which pass for cat talk", stating that it "grows old fast". Several critics have compared Warriors to Brian Jacques's Redwall series, though one commented that it was "not as elegantly written". Similarities between Into the Wild and Harry Potter and the Philosopher's Stone have been noted An interviewer described the plot as "Shakespearian: a mad leader, intra-clan betrayal, war, star-crossed lovers, death". Into the Wild was nominated for the 2006 Young Reader's Choice Awards but lost to Christopher Paolini's Eragon. It was also listed on Booklist's Top 10 fantasy books for youth in 2003 and was a Book Sense 76 Pick.

Fire and Ice received mixed reviews. The novel was well received by a reviewer for Voice of Youth Advocates, which observed that "Hunter works hard at incorporating authentic cat mannerisms and behaviors" and that "although more sophisticated teens might be put off by the coy dialogue attributes, younger readers probably will not notice and will be caught up in Fireheart's adventures". On the other hand, a reviewer for Children's Literature found the plot to be "flat, repetitious, much too long, and in the end unsatisfying except perhaps to devoted cat lovers or readers who revel in invented worlds".

School Library Journal observed that readers unfamiliar with the first novel would find this one difficult to follow and that the "characterizations of the animals are somewhat flat, although it is possible to tell them apart, and the plot's twists and turns seem mapped out and predictable". Kirkus Reviews praised the increased tensions, noting that "Hunter's world keeps getting more finely drawn, and her characters more complex" though readers may be disappointed that Fireheart fails to resolve his "conflicting responsibilities". Booklist likewise praised the novel's tension, noting that the "characters remain true to their feline natures, adding to the plausibility of events in this tension filled story".

One reviewer, commenting on Forest of Secrets, compared the "huge cast" to that of a Greek drama, and a reviewer for Booklist praised the novel's plot elements, which created "another dynamic episode sure to please series fans". A reviewer for Horn Book Review praised the author's ability to balance the conflicts and everyday lives of the Clan cats, and a reviewer for Children's Literature wrote that the book "is filled with intrigue and adventure". The series' realism also means that it contains a relatively large amount of violence, with one critic stating that it is "not for the faint of heart".

Rising Storm was mostly well received by critics. In one review by Booklist, the reviewer calls the novel suspenseful, also noting how the story echoes the journey to maturity. Another review, by VOYA, noted that while the books lacks humor and depth, there was still appeal in the hidden world of the warrior cats. A BookLoons review particularly praised the ending, calling it a cliffhanger. However, Children's Literature was not as positive, saying it was getting hard to remember all of the characters' relatives and leaders.

A review by Horn Book Review for both Rising Storm and A Dangerous Path was positive, writing "The fourth and fifth entries in the series continue the development of the complex, dynamic characters".

A Dangerous Path received a positive reception from Bookloons, with a reviewer praising the rising tension in the book. A reviewer for Booklist called the book exciting and praised the fast pace, writing that "Hunter maintains the established characterizations of her sentient cats, who still retain their feline natures. With compelling intrigue and fast-paced actions, this is one of the most exciting books in the series".

The Darkest Hour received universal praise and is regarded as one of the best books of the series. It garnered praise from Hilary Williamson, who wrote, "The Darkest Hour is the best yet in this thrilling series of feline adventure, that also stresses the importance of caring and community". Booklist calls The Darkest Hour "tension-filled".

== Editions ==
All of the books in Warriors: The Prophecies Begin have been published as hardcovers and as paperbacks. Warriors: the Prophecies Begin was first published in the United States and United Kingdom. The editions published of the first five books of the first series—Into the Wild to A Dangerous Path—in the United Kingdom had slight variations in cover design from their United States counterparts. Warriors is also sold in New Zealand, Australia, and Canada. Translations from English into other languages such as Czech, Lithuanian, Finnish, Japanese, French, Russian, Chinese and Korean have been published more recently. The sub-series has been published in Korea and Germany. The first two books have been printed in Poland and Italy. In the Chinese translation of the series, "3-D trading cards" are packaged in each book. These cards feature pictures of the cats on the centre of the bookcover with the Chinese and English names, and biographical information on the back. Cards included in the Warriors sub-series feature Firestar, Bluestar, Tallstar, Graystripe, Tigerstar, and a collage of the 5 previous cats.

Into the Wild has been released and translated in twenty countries including German, Britain, France, Russia, Japan, Korea, China, Czech Republic, Lithuania, Portugal, Hungary, Brazil, Norway and Greece. In Germany, the book has also been released as an audiobook. The Chinese version was released on 31 October 2008, with a 3-D card of Firepaw.

Other languages that Fire and Ice has been released in include German, Japanese, French, Russian, and Korean. A Chinese version has also been released that includes a 3-D card made of stereoscopic lenticular prints featuring Bluestar.

Forest of Secrets has also been translated into other languages such as German, Japanese, French, Russian, and Korean. The Chinese version was released on 30 November 2008 and is packaged with a 3-D trading card featuring Tallstar.

Rising Storm has also been translated into other languages such as German, Japanese, French, Russian, and Korean. The Chinese version was released on 30 November 2008, and also includes a 3-D trading card of Graystripe.

A Dangerous Path has also been published in foreign languages such as German, Japanese, French, Russian and Korean. The Chinese version was published on 31 December 2008 and is packaged along with a 3D trading card of Tigerstar.

The Darkest Hour has also been published in German, Chinese, Japanese, French, Russian, and Korean.
