= Pen name =

Names that authors use instead of real names

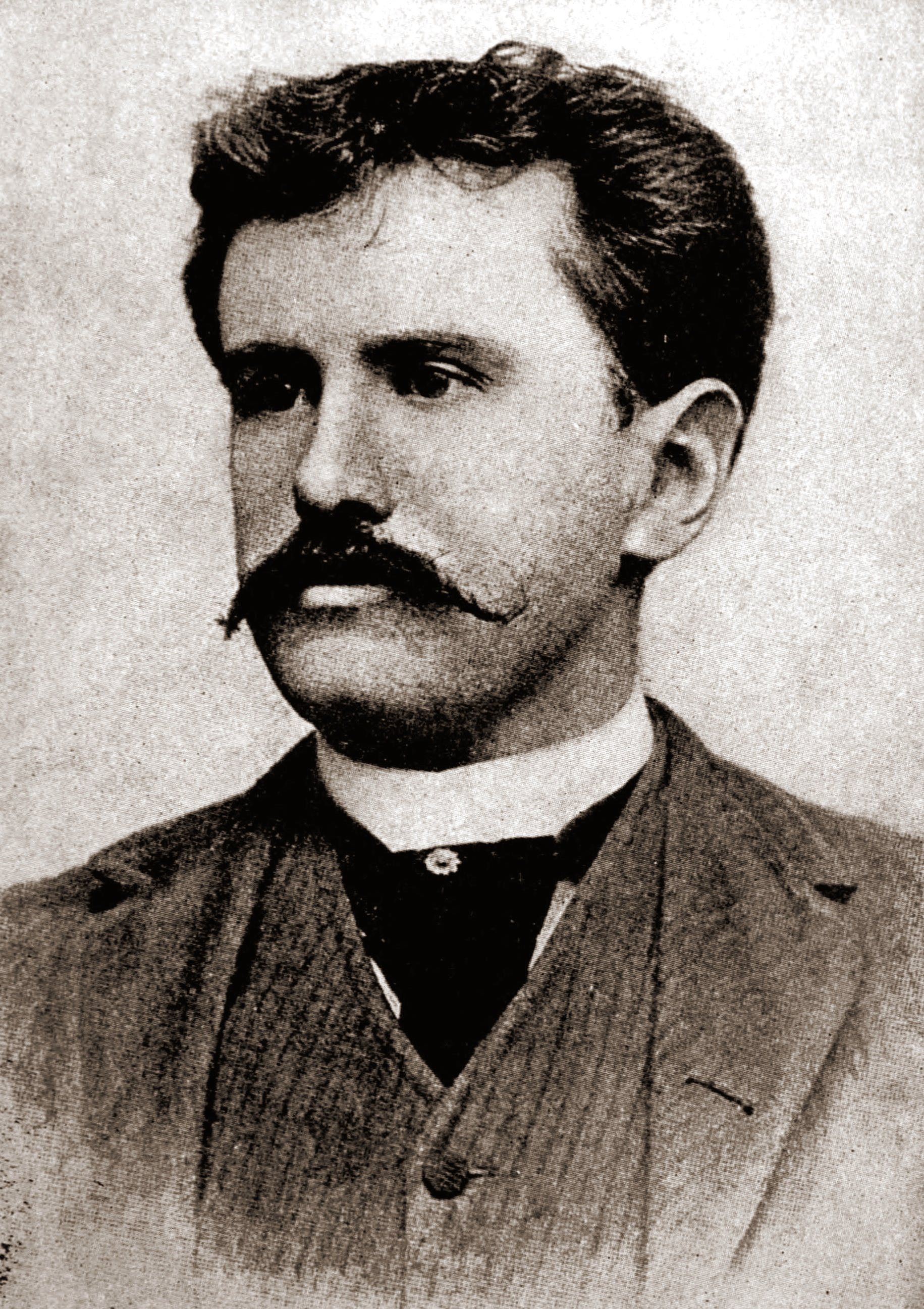
William Sydney Porter, known widely by his pen name O. Henry or Olivier Henry, in 1909

A pen name or nom-de-plume is a pseudonym (or, in some cases, a variant form of a real name) adopted by an author and printed on the title page or by-line of their works in place of their real name.

A pen name may be used to make the author's name more distinctive, to disguise the author's gender, to distance the author from their other works, to protect the author from retribution for their writings, to merge multiple persons into a single identifiable author, or for any of several reasons related to the marketing or aesthetic presentation of the work.

The author's real identity may be known only to the publisher or may become common knowledge. In some cases, such as those of Elena Ferrante and Torsten Krol, a pen name may preserve an author's long-term anonymity.

== Etymology ==
Pen name is formed by joining pen with name. Its earliest use in English is in the 1860s, in the writings of Bayard Taylor.

The French-language phrase nom de plume is used as a synonym for "pen name" (plume meaning 'pen'). However, it is not the French usage, according to H. W. Fowler and F. G. Fowler in The King's English, but instead a "back-translation" from English. The French usage is nom de guerre (a more generalised term for 'pseudonym'). Since guerre means 'war' in French, nom de guerre confused some English speakers, who "corrected" the French metaphor. This phrase precedes "pen name", being attested to The Knickerbocker, in 1841.

== Western literature ==
=== Europe and the United States ===
An author may use a pen name if their real name is likely to be confused with that of another author or other significant individual. For instance, in 1899 the British politician Winston Churchill wrote under the name Winston S. Churchill to distinguish his writings from those of the American novelist of the same name.

An author may use a pen name implying a rank or title which they have never actually held. William Earl Johns wrote under the name "Capt. W. E. Johns" although the highest army rank he held was acting lieutenant and his highest air force rank was flying officer.

Authors who regularly write in more than one genre may use different pen names for each, either in an attempt to conceal their true identity or even after their identity is known. Romance writer Nora Roberts writes erotic thrillers under the pen name J. D. Robb (such books were originally listed as by "J. D. Robb" and are now titled "Nora Roberts writing as J. D. Robb"); Scots writer Iain Banks wrote mainstream or literary fiction under his own name and science fiction under Iain M. Banks; Samuel Langhorne Clemens used the aliases Mark Twain and Sieur Louis de Conte for different works. Similarly, an author who writes both fiction and non-fiction (such as the mathematician and fantasy writer Charles Dodgson, who wrote as Lewis Carroll) may use a pseudonym for fiction writing. Science fiction author Harry Turtledove has used the name H. N. Turtletaub for some historical novels he has written because he and his publisher felt that the presumed lower sales of those novels might hurt bookstore orders for the novels he writes under his name.

Even within the same genre, authors may use a pen name if their better-known name may lead potential readers to misunderstand the nature of the book. In children's picture books, Dr. Seuss — itself a whimsical pen name for Theodor Geisel originating when he was banned from illustrating for his college humor magazine due to illegal drinking – used the name "Theo. LeSieg," "LeSieg" being "Geisel" spelled backward, on books he wrote but did not illustrate. Geisel's bestselling books had become associated with a very recognizable art style, which the LeSieg books lacked. Later in his career, Geisel did publish two books illustrated by others under his primary pen name, and following his death the LeSieg books have been reissued as by Dr. Seuss, "writing as Theo. LeSieg."

Occasionally, a pen name is employed to avoid overexposure. Prolific authors for pulp magazines often had two and sometimes three short stories appearing in one issue of a magazine; the editor would create several fictitious author names to hide this from readers. Robert A. Heinlein wrote stories under the pseudonyms of Anson MacDonald (a combination of his middle name and his then-wife's maiden name) and Caleb Strong so that more of his works could be published in a single magazine. Stephen King published four novels under the name Richard Bachman because publishers did not feel the public would buy more than one novel per year from a single author. Eventually, after critics found a large number of style similarities, publishers revealed Bachman's true identity.

Sometimes a pen name is used because an author believes that their name does not suit the genre they are writing in. Western novelist Pearl Gray dropped his first name and changed the spelling of his last name to Zane Grey because he believed that his real name did not suit the Western genre. Romance novelist Angela Knight writes under that name instead of her actual name (Julie Woodcock) because of the double entendre of her surname in the context of that genre. Romain Gary, who was a well-known French writer, decided in 1973 to write novels in a different style under the name Émile Ajar and even asked his cousin's son to impersonate Ajar; thus he received the most prestigious French literary prize twice, which is forbidden by the prize rules. He revealed the affair in a book he sent his editor just before committing suicide in 1980.

A pen name may be shared by different writers to suggest continuity of authorship. Thus the Bessie Bunter series of English boarding school stories, initially written by the prolific Charles Hamilton under the name Hilda Richards, was taken on by other authors who continued to use the same pen name.

In some forms of fiction, the pen name adopted is the name of the lead character, to suggest to the reader that the book is an autobiography of a real person. Daniel Handler used the pseudonym Lemony Snicket to present his A Series of Unfortunate Events books as memoirs by an acquaintance of the main characters. Some, however, do this to fit a certain theme. One example, Pseudonymous Bosch, used his pen name just to expand the theme of secrecy in The Secret Series.

Authors may occasionally choose pen names to appear in more favorable positions in bookshops or libraries, to maximize visibility when placed on shelves that are conventionally arranged alphabetically moving horizontally, then upwards vertically.

=== Female authors ===
Some female authors have used pen names to ensure that their works were accepted by publishers and/or the public. Such is the case of Peru's Clarinda, whose work was published in the early 17th century. More often, women have adopted masculine pen names. This was common in the 19th century when women were beginning to make inroads into literature but it was felt they would not be taken as seriously by readers as female authors. For example, Mary Ann Evans wrote under the pen name George Eliot; and Amandine Aurore Lucile Dupin, and Baronne Dudevant, used the pseudonym George Sand. Charlotte, Emily, and Anne Brontë published under the names Currer, Ellis, and Acton Bell, respectively. French-Savoyard writer and poet Amélie Gex published as Dian de Jeânna ("John, son of Jane") during the first half of her career. Karen Blixen's very successful Out of Africa (1937) was originally published under the pen name Isak Dinesen. Victoria Benedictsson, a Swedish author of the 19th century, wrote under the name Ernst Ahlgren. The science fiction author Alice B. Sheldon for many years published under the masculine name of James Tiptree, Jr., the discovery of which led to a deep discussion of gender in the genre.

More recently, women who write in genres commonly written by men sometimes use initials, such as K. A. Applegate, C. J. Cherryh, P. N. Elrod, D. C. Fontana, S. E. Hinton, G. A. Riplinger, J. D. Robb, and J. K. Rowling, (Note: The publisher of J.K. Rowling, author of the Harry Potter series, felt that Rowling's obviously female first name "Joanne" would dissuade boys from reading the novel series.) who also writes the Cormoran Strike series of crime fiction novels under the pseudonym Robert Galbraith. Alternatively, they may use a unisex pen name, such as Robin Hobb (the second pen name of novelist Margaret Astrid Lindholm Ogden).

=== Collective names ===
A collective name, also known as a house name, is one pen name for works published by the same publishing house even though more than one author may have contributed to the series. Novellas and paperback books credited to Maxwell Grant, featuring the adventures of The Shadow, were written largely by Walter B. Gibson but other writers contributed to the series. The erotic-adventures Slocum series of westerns were all credited to Jake Logan, but many different authors wrote the books.

In some cases, the first books in a series were written by one writer but subsequent books were written by ghostwriters. For instance, Leslie Charteris wrote the early volumes of The Saint adventure series, but he supervised and edited the works of ghostwriters for the remainder of the series. Similarly, Nancy Drew mystery books are published as though they were written by Carolyn Keene, The Hardy Boys books are published as the work of Franklin W. Dixon, and The Bobbsey Twins series are credited to Laura Lee Hope, although numerous authors have been involved in each series. Erin Hunter, the author of the Warriors novel series, is a collective pen name used by authors Kate Cary, Cherith Baldry, Tui T. Sutherland, and the editor Victoria Holmes.

Collaborative authors may also have their works published under a single pen name. Frederic Dannay and Manfred B. Lee published their mystery novels and stories under the pen name Ellery Queen, which was also used to publish the work of several ghostwriters they commissioned. The writers of Atlanta Nights, a deliberately bad book intended to embarrass the publishing firm PublishAmerica, used the pen name Travis Tea. Additionally, the credited author of The Expanse, James S. A. Corey, is an amalgam of the middle names of collaborating writers Daniel Abraham and Ty Franck respectively, while S. A. is the initials of Abraham's daughter. Sometimes multiple authors will write related books under the same pseudonym; examples include T. H. Lain in fiction. The Australian fiction collaborators who write under the pen name Alice Campion are a group of women who have so far written The Painted Sky (2015) and The Shifting Light (2017).

In the 1780s, The Federalist Papers were written under the pseudonym "Publius" by Alexander Hamilton, James Madison, and John Jay. The three men chose the name "Publius" because it recalled the founder of the Roman Republic and using it implied a positive intention.

In pure mathematics, Nicolas Bourbaki is the pseudonym of a group of mostly French-connected mathematicians attempting to expose the field in an axiomatic and self-contained, encyclopedic form.

=== Concealment of identity ===
A pseudonym may be used to protect the writer of exposé books about espionage or crime. Former SAS soldier Steven Billy Mitchell used the pseudonym Andy McNab for his book about a failed SAS mission titled Bravo Two Zero. The name Ibn Warraq ("son of a papermaker") has been used by dissident Muslim authors. Author Brian O'Nolan used the pen names Flann O'Brien and Myles na gCopaleen for his novels and journalistic writing from the 1940s to the 1960s because Irish civil servants were not permitted at that time to publish political writings. The identity of the enigmatic twentieth-century novelist B. Traven has never been conclusively revealed, despite thorough research.

A multiple-use name or anonymity pseudonym is a pseudonym open for anyone to use and these have been adopted by various groups, often as a protest against the cult of individual creators. In Italy, two anonymous groups of writers have gained some popularity with the collective names of Luther Blissett and Wu Ming.

== Eastern literature ==
=== Hong Kong ===
Wuxia novelist Louis Cha uses the pen name Gum Yoong (金庸) by taking apart the components of the Chinese character in his given name (鏞) from his birth name Cha Leung-yung (查良鏞).

=== India ===
In Indian languages, writers may put a pen name at the end of their names, like Ramdhari Singh Dinkar. Some writers, like Firaq Gorakhpuri, wrote only under a pen name.

In early Indian literature, authors considered the use of names egotistical. Because names were avoided, it is difficult to trace the authorship of many earlier literary works from India. Later writers adopted the practice of using the name of their deity of worship or Guru's name as their pen name. In this case, typically the pen name would be included at the end of the prose or poetry.

Composers of Indian classical music used pen names in compositions to assert authorship, including Sadarang, Gunarang (Fayyaz Ahmed Khan), Ada Rang (court musician of Muhammad Shah), Sabrang (Bade Ghulam Ali Khan), and Ramrang (Ramashreya Jha). Other compositions are apocryphally ascribed to composers with their pen names.

=== Japan ===
Japanese poets who write haiku often use a haigō (俳号). The haiku poet Matsuo Bashō had used two other haigō before he became fond of a banana plant (bashō) that had been given to him by a disciple and started using it as his pen name at the age of 36.

Similar to a pen name, Japanese artists usually have a gō or art-name, which might change a number of times during their career. In some cases, artists adopted different gō at different stages of their career, usually to mark significant changes in their life. One of the most extreme examples of this is Hokusai, who in the period 1798 to 1806 alone used no fewer than six. Manga artist Ogure Ito uses the pen name Oh! great because his real name Ogure Ito is roughly how the Japanese pronounce "oh great".

=== Persian and Urdu poetry ===
Note: List of Urdu language poets provides pen names for a range of Urdu poets.

A shâ'er (Persian from Arabic, for poet) (a poet who writes she'rs in Urdu or Persian) almost always has a "takhallus", a pen name, traditionally placed at the end of the name (often marked by a graphical sign ـؔ placed above it) when referring to the poet by his full name. For example, Hafez is a pen name for Shams al-Din, and thus the usual way to refer to him would be Shams al-Din Hafez or just Hafez. Mirza Asadullah Baig Khan (his official name and title) is referred to as Mirza Asadullah Khan Ghalib, or just Mirza Ghalib.

== See also ==
- Courtesy name
- List of pen names
- List of pseudonyms
- Nom de guerre
- Pseudepigrapha
- Ring name – the equivalent concept among professional wrestlers
- Stage name – the equivalent concept among performers
- Slave name
