= Empty city =

Empty city may refer to:

- Naypidaw, the capital of Myanmar, previously known as Burma
- Ordos City, a city in China referred to as Empty City, more commonly known as Ghost City
- The Empty City (Survivors), a children's novel by Erin Hunter
