= The First Battle =

The First Battle may refer to:

- The First Battle, a 2014 Warriors: Dawn of the Clans novel in the Warriors series by Erin Hunter
- The First Battle: A Story of the Campaign of 1896, a memoir by U.S. presidential candidate William Jennings Bryan
