= Darkness Falls =

Darkness Falls may refer to:

- Darkness Falls (1999 film), a British drama starring Ray Winstone
- Darkness Falls (2003 film), an American horror film starring Emma Caulfield
- Darkness Falls (2020 film), a crime thriller film
- "Darkness Falls" (The X-Files), a 1994 episode of The X-Files
- Darkness Falls, a 1997 online fantasy role-playing game by Mythic Entertainment
- Darkness Falls, a 1994 List of Hardy Boys books#The Hardy Boys Casefiles (1987–1998) novel
- "Darkness Falls" (The Legend of Korra), a 2013 episode of The Legend of Korra
- Darkness Falls, the third book in Survivors (novel series) by Erin Hunter
- "Darkness Falls", a 2018 track by Toby Fox from Deltarune Chapter 1 OST from the video game Deltarune
