= Rising Storm (novel) =

2004 novel by Erin Hunter

- First edition
- Author: Erin Hunter
- Cover artist: Wayne McLoughlin
- Language: English
- Series: Warriors
- Genre: Children's literature Fantasy novel
- Publisher: Avon; HarperCollins
- Publication date: 6 January 2004
- Publication place: United States
- Media type: Print (hardback & paperback)
- Pages: 336
- ISBN: 978-0-06-052563-7
- OCLC: 297198593
- Preceded by: Forest of Secrets
- Followed by: A Dangerous Path

Rising Storm is a fantasy novel, the fourth book in the Warriors series, written under the pen name of Erin Hunter. Rising Storm was written by Kate Cary. The series follows the adventures of four Clans of anthropomorphic feral cats. The plot follows Fireheart, newest deputy of ThunderClan, struggling to complete his duties as deputy, while still knowing that the previous deputy, Tigerclaw, is lurking in the forest somewhere, seeking revenge against Fireheart and his Clan.

The book was first released as a hardcover in the US on 6 January 2004. It was then released in both paperback and e-book format. The UK has received the paperback version along with Canada. Rising Storm has been published in multiple languages, including Chinese, German, and French. Reviews for the book were mixed, with reviewers praising the suspense and cliffhanger ending; however, some reviews criticized the growing number of characters and lack of humor and depth.

== Synopsis ==
=== Setting ===
Rising Storm takes place in a fictional forest. The forest is home to four Clans of wild cats, ThunderClan, WindClan, RiverClan and ShadowClan, each of which lives in a piece of territory suited to their skills/abilities.

The forest is based on New Forest in Southern England. In addition to the New Forest, Loch Lomond, the Scottish Highlands, and the Forest of Dean also inspired the fictional locales in the novel.

=== Plot ===
Fireheart is ThunderClan's new deputy, but the previous deputy, Tigerclaw, still haunts Fireheart's dreams. Fireheart wonders if ThunderClan would be ready if Tigerclaw attacked, as many of the cats are still shocked by Tigerclaw's disloyalty, and many warriors are still badly injured. Bluestar begins to become distrustful of the Clan after Tigerclaw's betrayal, trusting only her most senior warriors, and those who were not Clanborn.

Bluestar, accompanied by Fireheart, goes to speak with StarClan, the Clans' warrior ancestors, at the Moonstone, located inside a disused quarry mine known to the Clans as Mothermouth. On the way there, a patrol of WindClan warriors stop them. The ThunderClan leader later fears that StarClan sent WindClan to stop them from going to Mothermouth and speaking with StarClan, which causes her to slip into further paranoia.

Fireheart struggles with his disrespectful nephew and apprentice, Cloudpaw, who disobeys Fireheart's orders to stay away from Twolegs (humans), and is eventually abducted by them. Fireheart and his friend, Sandstorm, then go on a quest to rescue Cloudpaw. They find him, take him back, and he is accepted back into the Clan by convincing the Clan that he went against his will. Meanwhile, Fireheart struggles to cope with missing his best friend, Graystripe, who left ThunderClan with his kits to live in RiverClan, the kits' mother's Clan.

The forest gets hotter and hotter as summer drags on, and eventually a wildfire sweeps through the forest. It destroys ThunderClan's camp and taking the lives of two elders, Patchpelt and Halftail, as well as Yellowfang, ThunderClan's senior medicine cat. At the end of the book, it is revealed at a Gathering that both Nightstar and Cinderfur, elderly leader and deputy of ShadowClan respectively, have died from a sickness, and that Tigerclaw, now Tigerstar, is the new leader of ShadowClan.

== Publication history ==
Rising Storm was first published as a hardcover in the US on 6 January 2004. The book was later also published as a paperback on 15 February 2005 and an e-book on 4 September 2007. In the UK, the book was first released on 2 October 2006 as a paperback. The Canadian version released early on 8 January 2004. It has also been translated into other languages such as German, Japanese, French, Russian, and Korean. The Chinese version was released on 30 November 2008, and also includes a 3-D trading card of Graystripe.

== Themes ==
A major topic in this book is power. Tigerclaw is determined to take over ThunderClan, even after being banished from the Clan for trying to do so earlier. Other themes are violence and death. Booklist notes that "teens may find their own journey toward adulthood echoed in the protagonist's struggles and self-doubts".

== Critical reception ==
Rising Storm was mostly well received by critics. In one review by Booklist, the reviewer calls the novel suspenseful, also noting how the story echoes the journey to maturity. Another review, by Voice of Youth Advocates, noted that while the books lacks humor and depth, there was still appeal in the hidden world of the warrior cats. A BookLoons review particularly praised the ending, calling it a cliffhanger. A review by Horn Book Review for both Rising Storm and A Dangerous Path was also positive writing "The fourth and fifth entries in the series continue the development of the complex, dynamic characters". However, Children's Literature was not as positive, saying it was getting hard to remember all of the characters' relatives and leaders.
