= Into the Wild (novel) =

2003 novel by Erin Hunter

- First edition cover
- Author: Erin Hunter
- Cover artist: Wayne McLoughlin
- Series: Warriors
- Genre: Fantasy novel
- Publisher: Avon, HarperCollins
- Publication date: 21 January 2003
- Publication place: United Kingdom
- Media type: Print (hardback & paperback)
- Pages: 272 (depending on edition)
- ISBN: 978-0-06-000002-8
- LC Class: PZ7.H916625 In 2003
- Followed by: Fire and Ice

Into the Wild is a fantasy novel about the lives of fictional cats, written by a team of authors using the pseudonym Erin Hunter. The novel was published by HarperCollins in Canada and the United States in January 2003, and in the United Kingdom in February 2003. It is the first novel in the Warriors series. The book has been published in paperback and e-book formats in twenty different languages. The story is about a young domestic cat named Rusty who leaves his human owners to join a group of forest-dwelling feral cats called ThunderClan, adopting a new name: Firepaw. He is trained to defend and hunt for the clan, becomes embroiled in a murder and betrayal within the clan, and, at the end of the book, receives his warrior name, Fireheart, after a battle with another clan. The novel is written from the perspective of Fireheart (previously known as Rusty for a short time, then, for most of the book, Firepaw).

The series began in 2003 when HarperCollins requested Victoria Holmes to write a book on feral cats. After creating one storyline, Holmes brought in Kate Cary to finish writing the book as Holmes went behind the scenes to edit and supervise the details. Holmes has compared the style of the book to a different language as the books are written by three separate authors. She feels that Erin Hunter must have a consistent voice the entire series. The story uses a lexicon with words such as "Twoleg" substituted for "human" or "new-leaf" for "spring". The style has been compared to the Harry Potter series, J.R.R. Tolkien and Brian Jacques. Themes include family, loyalty, death, courage, and survival. Into the Wild was critically well received. Booklist believed the book would appeal to followers of Brian Jacques' Redwall series. Among other awards, it claimed third place in the 2006 Young Reader's Choice Awards program of the Pacific Northwest Library Association.

== Development and publication ==
=== Conception ===
Feral cats seemed like an excellent compromise between regular domestic pussycats and a truly wild animal: they have all the freedom and independence of living in the wild, but they would be instantly recognizable to readers as the pet lying on their lap.
— Victoria Holmes answering how the idea for Warriors began.

In 2003, HarperCollins requested Victoria Holmes to create a fantasy series about feral cats, but, being more interested in dogs and not a reader of fantasy, she was less than enthusiastic. She "couldn't imagine coming up with enough ideas". Nonetheless, she worked with the concept, expanding the storyline with elements of war, politics, revenge, doomed love, and religious conflict. Although the original plan was a stand-alone novel, enough material was created for several books, and the publisher decided upon a six-volume series. Holmes then enlisted the help of another author, Kate Cary whom Holmes had previously edited for and knew she loved cats. The first volume, Into the Wild, was written by Kate Cary under the pseudonym Erin Hunter, and completed in about three months. Holmes continued to act behind the scenes editing and supervising details. Afterwards, Holmes began to like the idea of using cats since she realized how they can be leading private lives without any humans realizing.

== Pseudonym ==
With four authors at the time Holmes decided to have a pseudonym since having four authors would place the books at different places at libraries, confusing and possibly scaring off potential readers. The last name Hunter was chosen since it put the books next to the similar Redwall series.

=== Publication history ===
Into the Wild was first published as a hardcover by HarperCollins on 9 January 2003 in Canada. The book was released on 21 January 2003 in the United States, and in February 2003 in the United Kingdom. Into the Wild was released as a paperback in the US on 6 January 2004. On 4 September 2007, the book was released as an eBook, and on Amazon's Kindle. The book was one of the first to be in HarperCollins' "Browse Inside" program where twenty percent of the novel is available online. For a limited time, the complete novel was also available online. The paperback version sold 150,637 copies in 2008.

The novel has been released and translated in twenty countries including Germany, Britain, France, Russia, Japan, Korea, China, Romania, Republic of Moldova, Czech Republic, Lithuania, Portugal, Hungary, Brazil, Norway and Greece. In Germany, the book has also been released as an audiobook. The Chinese version was released on 31 October 2008, with a 3-D card of Firepaw.

== Plot ==
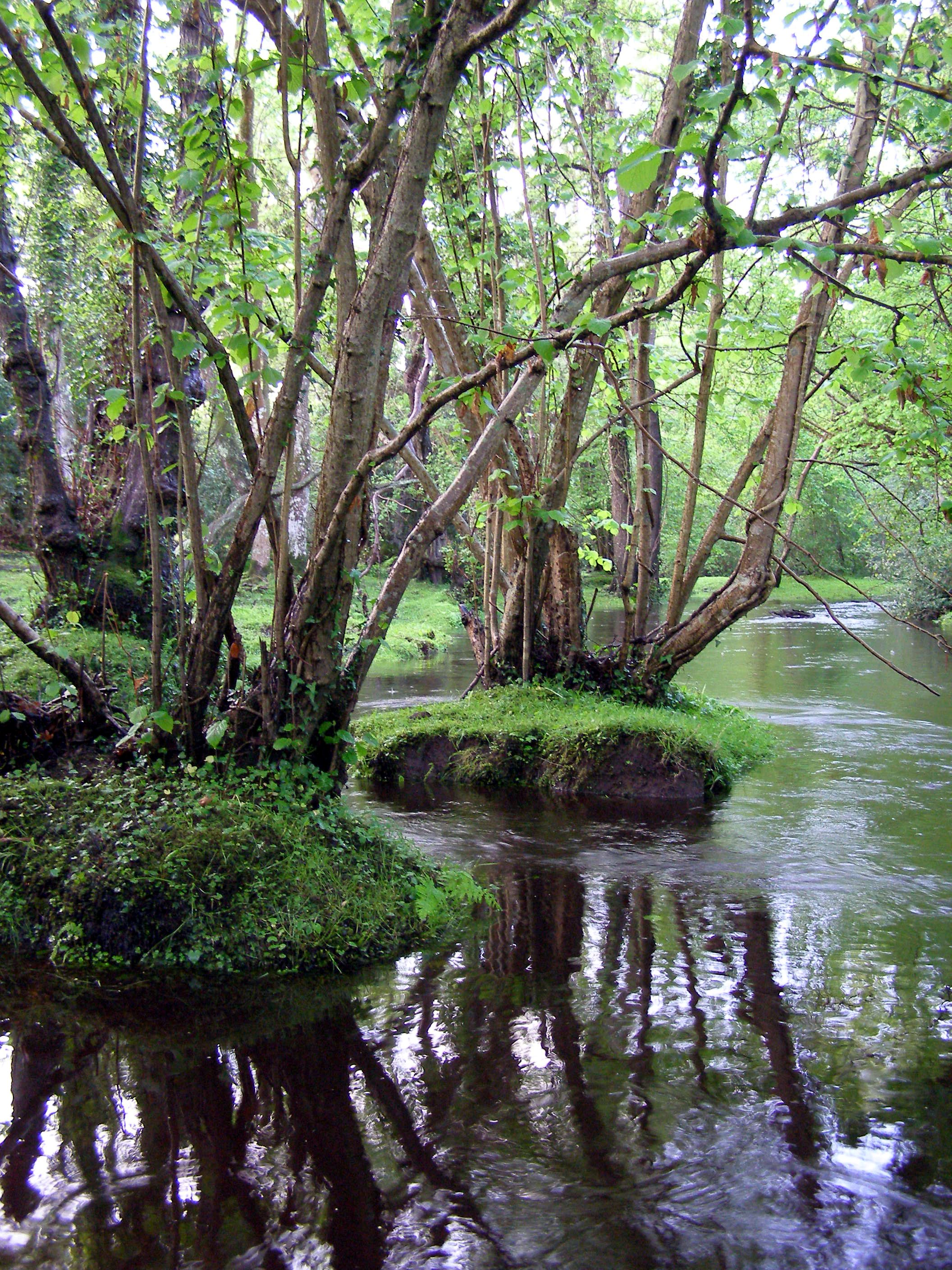
The fictional forest of the novel was originally inspired by New Forest (above) and other locales in England and Scotland.

Into the Wild follows the integration of a house cat named Rusty into a group of feral cats in a fictional setting inspired by the New Forest, the woods about Loch Lomond, the Forest of Dean, and the Scottish Highlands. The group, named ThunderClan, shares the fictional forest with three other groups: RiverClan, WindClan, and ShadowClan.

The novel opens with a territorial dispute between ThunderClan and RiverClan. ThunderClan is outnumbered in battle and forced to retreat. Afterwards, ThunderClan's medicine cat Spottedleaf receives a prophecy from the spirits of the cats' deceased ancestors, StarClan. She shares the prophecy with ThunderClan's leader Bluestar, saying that "fire alone will save our Clan".

When Rusty, a flame-coloured housecat, ventures into the forest near his home, he encounters three ThunderClan members: Bluestar, apprentice Graypaw, and warrior Lionheart. They invite Rusty to join their Clan. At the ThunderClan camp, some members reject Rusty for his domesticated past. The hostility culminates in a fight between Rusty and Longtail, a ThunderClan warrior. When Rusty loses his collar, Bluestar halts the fight and announces that Rusty has earned his apprentice name, Firepaw. Shortly after, ThunderClan's deputy Redtail is revealed to have died in another battle, and Bluestar names Lionheart the new ThunderClan deputy leader.

Firepaw forms a strong friendship with Graypaw and Ravenpaw. Ravenpaw is apprenticed to Tigerclaw, an ambitious ThunderClan warrior who wishes to become Clan leader.

On his first solo hunting mission, Firepaw encounters the exiled ShadowClan medicine cat Yellowfang. They initially fight, but after Firepaw emerges victorious, he realizes that Yellowfang is starving. He quickly catches her some prey and the two eat together. After a patrol led by Bluestar discovers them, Bluestar questions Firepaw and scolds him for feeding himself before his Clan. As punishment, Firepaw must take care of Yellowfang, whom ThunderClan imprisons.

As Firepaw continues to train, he and Graypaw are invited to attend the Gathering, a peaceful meeting held every full moon between all four Clans. When the Gathering begins, the ShadowClan leader, Brokenstar, announces that ShadowClan has driven out a former ShadowClan kitten-murderer and the entirety of WindClan. ThunderClan quickly returns to camp and confronts Yellowfang, believing her to be the murderer. As they lack solid evidence of her guilt, Bluestar orders the Clan not to harm Yellowfang.

A few days later, Bluestar, Tigerclaw, Ravenpaw, Firepaw, and Graypaw travel to the Moonstone, a sacred site. While they are gone, ShadowClan cats attack ThunderClan's camp, killing Lionheart. Tigerclaw is named deputy in his place. Shortly afterwards, ShadowClan cats sneak into ThunderClan's camp and abduct several kittens, as well as murdering Spottedleaf. With the exception of Firepaw, Graypaw, and Ravenpaw, all of ThunderClan blames Yellowfang for these events.

Firepaw learns from Ravenpaw that Tigerclaw is traitor to ThunderClan, having murdered Redtail in the hopes of becoming deputy in his place. Firepaw and Graypaw lead Ravenpaw to a new home in a barn away from ThunderClan territory to protect him; Tigerclaw wishes to kill him for knowing too much incriminating information. A party led by Firepaw and Yellowfang then successfully rescues the abducted kittens from ShadowClan. That mission culminates in a battle, and Brokenstar and his followers are exiled from ShadowClan. Bluestar promotes Firepaw and Graypaw to warriors for their heroism, granting them the new names Fireheart and Graystripe. Having proven her innocence, Yellowfang is accepted as ThunderClan's medicine cat, replacing the murdered Spottedleaf.

== Style ==
"Into the Wild did occasionally remind me of the Harry Potter books, both in writing style and content. Rusty forms a firm friendship with an apprentice (warrior in training, more than six months old) called Graypaw, a longhaired solid grey tom. Graypaw adds the laughter to what is, when you really think about it, a rather gritty story. This friendship reminded me strongly of Harry and Ron when they first met in the Philosopher's Stone. Cats such as Bluestar and Yellowfang form the older authority figures. These two characters reminded me of Dumbledore and Snape (though not too closely)."
—A review from Fantasy Book Review comparing Into the Wild and the Harry Potter series by J.K. Rowling. Kate Cary describes the voice as their natural writing style.

The story is told in a third person point of view following the protagonist Firepaw. The narration stays with Firepaw until the next series, Warriors: The New Prophecy, in which the point of view alternates between cats since the authors felt that "we'd really told Firestar's story, and so we wanted to get a fresh viewpoint".

The style of the book has also been compared to the Redwall series by Brian Jacques. A reviewer for The Plain Dealer wrote that the book "is patterned in the style of classics by J.R.R. Tolkien or Brian Jacques". While School Library Journal recommended the book to Redwall fans, the reviewer still felt the style wasn't as elegant.

=== Lexicon ===
The book has a lexicon of special terminology. A Children's Literature review noted the words "kittypet" and "twoleg" which mean housecat and humans respectively. In the book, instead, of using "said", Cary uses the word "mewed". This was criticized with the reviewer writing "that 'he mewed', 'she purred', and 'the warrior mewed', which pass for cat talk, grows old fast". In response to a question at the Q&A section of the forum Holmes explained that the names come "in two parts, either or both of which can reflect something about the cat's appearance, personality, or habits". However, they must also be part of the world they know; Holmes originally gave Tigerclaw the name Hammerclaw until one of the editors pointed out the cats wouldn't know what a hammer is. For the names, Kate Cary says that she takes in inspiration for the names from "sight, sounds and scents the cats would experience". At the same time, more names become available as the cat's world becomes more diverse.

== Genres ==
HarperCollins originally requested that Holmes write a "fantasy story on feral cats". Though troubled on what to write about at first, Holmes realized she could add human themes and issues into the book such as "war, politics, revenge, doomed love, religious conflict". An interviewer has described the plot as "Shakespearian: a mad leader, intra-clan betrayal, war, star-crossed lovers, death". Reviews have also called the story an "animal adventure".

The novel was picked to be part of the young adult fantasy genre due to its increasing popularity. Cherith Baldry feels that the growth of the genre is due to the fact that "fantasy is something very deeply rooted in the human mind, not just for children". Fantasy stories are able to deal with human emotions helping readers to deal with them in the real world. Another Erin Hunter, Kate Cary felt that fantasy books such as Harry Potter "is a sign of a deepening need for fantasy to brighten our lives". She describes how as a child she was far less restricted than today's children whose days are structured and scheduled. Cary feels that fantasy stories help kids "escape into the world of the imagination, because it's the only place they can be really free and un-judged".

== Themes ==
Publishers Weekly noted that themes such as family, friendship and responsibility are also taught in the warrior code, the set of rules that the clans must follow. Holmes has said that one of her favorite things about writing the series is being able to add in themes that apply to us all such as family, loss, honor, bravery, death, loyalty, and following rules. Other themes include "death and spirituality and family and relationships". She also added in human themes such as "starting at a new school (Rusty joining ThunderClan), falling in love with the wrong person (Graystripe and Silverstream) and being bullied by someone who should look after you (Tigerclaw bullying Ravenpaw)". To a reviewer for Kirkus Reviews, the human theme of fitting in was easily found and applauded when Rusty succeeds.

Another theme found throughout the book is the hardship of life in the wild. Reviews have noted how the story does not cover up the hardships of clan life. School Library Journal commented on how the story describes the hardships and difficulties of a feral cat's life in detail and how there is no sugarcoating of the violence. Fantasy Book Review also wrote "Erin Hunter does not spare the reader from the grim realities of living in the wild". Kirkus Reviews noted that doing so shows how the clans are on the brink of survival.

== Critical reception ==
Into the Wild received generally positive reviews. Booklist thought the novel "spine-tingling" and noted that "the cat characters are true to their feline nature, making this sure to appeal to fans of Clare Bell's long-popular Ratha's Creature (1983) and its sequels and also to followers of Brian Jacques' ongoing Redwall series." Publishers Weekly praised the excitement and also added that the book would please any person who "has ever wondered what dreams of grandeur may haunt the family cat". The review also praised the world of the cats and themes put into the book. Although School Library Journal thought the book not as well written as the Redwall series, it did note that the novel presented an "intriguing world with an intricate structure". The review also felt that there was too many supporting characters, but "there are standouts who give dimension to the tale". The amount of violence was also noted in the review. Kirkus Reviews joked the book would have cat owners look at their pets nervously before writing how Hunter doesn't have "any hint of sentimentality. Snapping bones, flowing blood, and sudden death abundantly demonstrate how these cats walk on the thin edge of survival". The review noted how teens would see how hard it is for Firepaw to fit in. Washington Times notes the tension rising between Tigerclaw and Firepaw and praised the scene where Longtail challenges Firepaw's right to be in the clan.

=== Awards and recognitions ===
Into the Wild claimed third place in the 2006 Young Reader's Choice Awards of the Pacific Northwest Library Association. The novel was listed on Booklist's Top 10 fantasy books for youth in 2003, and was a Book Sense 76 Pick.
