= Fire and Ice (Hunter novel) =

2003 novel by Erin Hunter

- First edition cover
- Author: Erin Hunter
- Cover artist: Wayne McLoughlin
- Language: English
- Series: Warriors
- Genre: Children's literature Fantasy novel
- Publisher: Avon, HarperCollins
- Publication date: 1 June 2003
- Publication place: United States/United Kingdom
- Media type: Print (hardback & paperback)
- Pages: 317 (hardcover); 336 (paperback)
- ISBN: 978-0-06-052559-0
- OCLC: 55800667
- Preceded by: Into the Wild
- Followed by: Forest of Secrets

Fire and Ice is a children's fantasy novel, the second book in the Warriors series, written by Kate Cary under the pen name Erin Hunter. The plot centers around Fireheart and Graystripe, newly promoted warriors of ThunderClan, which is one of the four groups of feral cats living in the wilderness. Fireheart learns that his best friend Graystripe has fallen in love with Silverstream, a warrior from RiverClan, even though it is against the cats' "warrior code".

The book was first published on 1 June 2003 in the US as a hardcover. Since then, Fire and Ice has been released in paperback and e-book format in other languages. The main theme of the book is that the type of person one is inside is more important than the way one seems from the outside. The book received mixed reviews: the negative reviews criticized the flat characters, and how troublesome it was to flip back to the characters list due to the large number of cats; positive reviews praised the suspense and rising tensions in the book.

== Synopsis ==
=== Setting ===
Fire and Ice takes place in a fictional forest which is home to four Clans of wild cats, ThunderClan, RiverClan, ShadowClan and WindClan, each of which lives in a territory best suited to their skills/abilities. The authors based the forest on New Forest in southern England.

=== Characters ===
- Fireheart is the main protagonist of the book. Originally a house cat named Rusty, he left his human owners to become an apprentice in ThunderClan. He is sent with Graystripe to find WindClan, who were chased out of their home by ShadowClan. Later, he realizes that Graystripe is in love with Silverstream, a warrior in RiverClan. Although he advises Graystripe against meeting her secretly, Fireheart agrees to keep it a secret.
- Graystripe is Fireheart's best friend. After receiving his warrior name, Graystripe is sent with Fireheart to find WindClan, who were chased out of their home by ShadowClan. During a patrol, Graystripe is saved by Silverstream, a RiverClan warrior, when he falls into the river, and almost drowns. As a result, Graystripe and Silverstream fall in love and begin to meet each other in secret, against Fireheart's warnings.
- Silverstream is a RiverClan warrior and the daughter of RiverClan's leader, Crookedstar. After saving Graystripe from drowning in the river, the two fall in love. Since the warrior code forbids cats from different Clans to be in love, they begin to meet in secret, sneaking out of camp in order to see each other.
- Tigerclaw is the main antagonist. Tigerclaw had previously killed his own Clanmate, Redtail, in hope of taking Redtail's place as deputy. Instead, Lionheart becomes deputy, but he too, later dies. Tigerclaw then finally becomes deputy. Only Fireheart, Graystripe and Ravenpaw (Tigerclaw's apprentice) know of Tigerclaw's plans, but they do not tell anyone out of fear of him.

=== Plot ===
Fire and Ice begins with Fireheart and Graystripe performing a traditional silent vigil after their promotion to warrior status in Into the Wild. In the first couple chapters, the book explains in third person how Fireheart and Graystripe start to get comfortable with being warriors. ThunderClan thinks Ravenpaw is dead, but Fireheart reveals the truth to Bluestar not long before a Gathering, a meeting of the Clans held on the night of a full moon, is held.

As their first task as warriors, Fireheart and Graystripe are assigned to find WindClan (cats that live primarily on the open moors), which had been driven out by ShadowClan, and bring them home. They go to the WindClan camp and search for clues there. On the way, they see some RiverClan warriors hunting on WindClan territory. Graystripe finds the correct scent trail, and they follow it to a makeshift WindClan camp. Fireheart spots Barley's farm a little ways off the trail and the pair hurriedly leaves in fear of the dogs that live on the farm chasing them after they get let out.

Eventually, Fireheart and Graystripe succeed, finding WindClan under a tangle of Thunderpaths (a highway interchange). When Fireheart and Graystripe first find the Thunderpaths, they are confused by the mixed-up scents. After figuring out WindClan is under it, they decide to spend the night right outside the makeshift home and wait until morning to greet the Clan. Then they bring them home.

Soon after, Bluestar apprentices Cinderpaw, a smoky-dark gray she-cat to Fireheart, and Brackenpaw, a golden-brown tabby tom to Graystripe. During a hunting patrol, Graystripe almost drowns after chasing a vole onto thin ice, falling in the river separating RiverClan and ThunderClan, but is rescued by Silverstream, a slender, light silver-gray-and-black tabby she-cat who is a RiverClan warrior. Graystripe and Silverstream fall in love; however, this is against the warrior code, a code of honor that all warriors must follow. And according to the code, warriors cannot fall in love with those not from their own Clan. Fireheart discovers their relationship, and unsuccessfully attempts to discourage them from seeing each other. Graystripe finally agrees to meet Silverstream only at the full moon at the Gathering, when the four Clans meet to share news. Fireheart later realizes that Graystripe has not been keeping his promise. Because Graystripe is often gone to see Silverstream, Fireheart takes over training Brackenpaw along with Cinderpaw.

Tigerclaw, in his ambition to become leader, sets a trap for Bluestar by another Thunderpath, intending to kill her, thus bringing him closer to becoming leader. Instead, Cinderpaw is crippled by the trap. Her leg is broken, and when it heals, she has a permanent limp, preventing her from becoming a warrior. She then trains under Yellowfang to become a medicine cat.

At one point, Fireheart is reunited with his sister, Princess, a fluffy light brown tabby she-cat kittypet living in a Twolegplace (human town). Princess gives Fireheart her oldest kit, Cloudkit the snowy-white young tom, to take into the Clan as a new apprentice. Although Fireheart agrees to accept his nephew as his new apprentice, his Clanmates, with the exception of Frostfur and Graystripe, are reluctant to accept him because of his kittypet blood, even though Fireheart himself also has kittypet blood. Bluestar allows him to stay, and Brindleface the pale gray tabby she-cat becomes his foster mother.

Brokenstar, the former ShadowClan leader, eventually attacks ThunderClan, along with several other exiled ShadowClan warriors. After the battle, the rogues are driven off, with the exception of Brokenstar himself, who is blinded by Yellowfang and is kept as a prisoner. When Fireheart suggests they kill the evil cat, Yellowfang refuses, sadly revealing that she is Brokenstar's mother.

Later, ThunderClan becomes involved in a fight against RiverClan and ShadowClan, when RiverClan and ShadowClan unite and try to drive WindClan out again, and WindClan ally themselves with ThunderClan. When Fireheart is attacked by Leopardfur, a dappled golden tabby she-cat who is the RiverClan deputy, Tigerclaw watches as Leopardfur and Fireheart fight, and does not attempt to join in. Silverstream attacks Fireheart but releases him; he then attacks her but, seeing Graystripe's look of dismay, he releases her. Darkstripe the large, lean, sleek, thin-furred, dark gray tabby tom witnesses the event and reports it to Tigerclaw. Consequently, Fireheart becomes certain that Tigerclaw is not to be trusted.

== Publication history ==
Fire and Ice was first published as a hardcover by HarperCollins in the US on 1 June 2003. The paperback version was released on 1 June 2004, and an e-book version was released on 9 September 2007. An English Kindle edition is also available.

Fire and Ice was published in Canada on 20 May 2004, and in the United Kingdom in June 2003. Other languages that Fire and Ice has been released in include German, Japanese, French, Russian, and Korean. A Chinese version has also been released that includes a 3-D card made of stereoscopic lenticular prints featuring Bluestar.

== Themes ==
The main theme of Fire and Ice is that "it doesn't matter where you come from, only who you are inside". Fireheart is challenged by other cats because he was once a kittypet (house cat), despite having proven his loyalty and bravery as a warrior. Similarly, Cloudkit was initially not accepted by the Clan because he had kittypet parents. Other themes include loyalty, betrayal, and forbidden love.

== Reception ==
Fire and Ice received mixed reviews. The novel was well received by Voice of Youth Advocates, which observed that "Hunter works hard at incorporating authentic cat mannerisms and behaviors" and that "although more sophisticated teens might be put off by the coy dialogue attributes, younger readers probably will not notice and will be caught up in Fireheart's adventures". Children's Literature found the plot to be "flat, repetitious, much too long, and in the end unsatisfying except perhaps to devoted cat lovers or readers who revel in invented worlds". School Library Journal observed that readers unfamiliar with the first novel would find this one difficult to follow and that the "characterizations of the animals are somewhat flat, although it is possible to tell them apart, and the plot's twists and turns seem mapped out and predictable". Kirkus Reviews praised the increased tensions, noting that "Hunter's world keeps getting more finely drawn, and her characters more complex" though readers may be disappointed that Fireheart fails to resolve his "conflicting responsibilities". Booklist likewise praised the novel's tension, noting that the "characters remain true to their feline natures, adding to the plausibility of events in this tension filled story". In a review for both Into the Wild and Fire and Ice, Horn Book Review suggested Redwall fans might find the series appealing.

== See also ==
- Characters in the Warriors series
