= Bravelands =

Series of juvenile fantasy novels by Erin Hunter

- The cover of Broken Pride, the first book in the series
- Broken Pride; Code of Honor; Blood and Bone; Shifting Shadows; The Spirit-Eaters; Oathkeeper; Shadows on the Mountain; The Venom Spreads; Blood on the Plains; The Shattered Horn; Breakers of the Code; Realm of Lost Spirits
- Author: Erin Hunter
- Cover artist: Owen Richardson
- Country: United Kingdom
- Language: English
- Genre: Teen literature, fantasy
- Publisher: HarperCollins
- Published: 6 June 2017 – present
- Media type: Print, e-book

Bravelands is a children's novel series written by Rosie Best and formerly Gillian Philip under the pseudonym Erin Hunter. The series has overall been well received, with critics praising the realistic behavior of the characters, the excitement in the novels, and the description of the Bravelands, though also criticizing it for its similarities to The Lion King.

== Summary ==
The story of Bravelands takes place in Africa. The animals of Africa live through coexistence by one rule: only kill to survive. The protagonist varies from chapter to chapter, and the set of protagonists varies from arc to arc.

== Books ==
=== Bravelands ===
The series follows the adventures of Fearless, a lion who was cast out of his pride, Thorn, a baboon who tries to rebel against his destiny, and Sky, an African bush elephant gifted with the ability to see the future in bones.

- Broken Pride - 6 June 2017 (Philip)
- Code of Honor - 6 February 2018 (Philip)
- Blood and Bone – 2 October 2018 (Philip)
- Shifting Shadows – 7 May 2019 (Philip)
- The Spirit-Eaters - 4 February 2020 (Philip)
- Oathkeeper - 22 September 2020 (Philip)

=== Bravelands: Curse of the Sandtongue ===
This series follows a gorilla with a deadly secret, a leopard struck by tragedy, and a gazelle cast out of her herd.

- Shadows on the Mountain – 18 May 2021 (Best)
- The Venom Spreads – 1 February 2022 (Best)
- Blood on the Plains – 4 October 2022 (Best)

=== Bravelands: Thunder on the Plains ===
This series follows an African buffalo who leads his herd, a cheetah harboring deadly secrets, and a spotted hyena trying to find peace between her clan and a pride of lions.

- The Shattered Horn – 2 May 2023 (Best)
- Breakers of the Code – 6 February 2024 (Best)
- Realm of Lost Spirits – 8 October 2024 (Best)

== Critical reception ==
The first book in the Bravelands series, Broken Pride appeared on The New York Times Best Seller list. School Library Journal criticizes the series for its similarities to The Lion King but writes, "Fans of Hunter's previous series will not be disappointed, and they will be anxious for the next installment in this new series." Kirkus Reviews gave it a starred review and writes, "Deep characters, a complex plot, rich mythology, and a stunning setting all come together to prove once again that the Hunter collective are master storytellers. Fans of Warriors will thrill at the opportunity to travel from the forest to the savanna in this brand new series."
