= Survivors (novel series) =

Series of juvenile fantasy novels by Erin Hunter

- Boxed set containing the first three books
- Survivors: The Empty City; A Hidden Enemy; Darkness Falls; The Broken Path; The Endless Lake; Storm of Dogs The Gathering Darkness: A Pack Divided; Dead of Night; Into the Shadows; Red Moon Rising; The Exile's Journey; The Final Battle
- Author: Erin Hunter
- Illustrator: Julia Green
- Country: United Kingdom
- Genre: Children's fantasy
- Publisher: HarperCollins
- Published: 21 August 2012 – 5 February 2019
- Media type: Print, e-book

Survivors is a novel series written by a team of authors under the pseudonym Erin Hunter. Survivors follows the adventures of a group of former domestic dogs who form a pack with the help of protagonist Lucky, after an earthquake separates them from their owners. The first book, The Empty City, was released on 21 August 2012, and was followed by eleven more books written between 2013 and 2019.

There are two sub-series, each containing six books. The first, Survivors: The Original Series, was published from 2012 to 2015. The second, Survivors: The Gathering Darkness, was written from 2015 to 2019.

The Survivors series has been released in e-book format for popular e-readers such as the Barnes & Noble Nook and Amazon Kindle. The series has also been translated into several languages. Survivors has garnered positive reviews, with critics praising the pacing, characters, and "magical" style of writing.

== Inspiration and origins ==
HarperCollins, publisher of the Survivors series, first suggested that the Erin Hunter team write a book series about dogs, but Victoria Holmes, a member of the team, was reluctant to create stories that would be too close to Warriors, the biggest series published under the Erin Hunter name. It was instead decided that the new series would be about bears, which became the Seekers series. In an interview two years later, Holmes said that, though she was "happy to focus on cats and bears right now", she would consider doing a series about dogs in the future. Gillian Philip, a former member of the Hunter team, later said that "dogs just felt like a natural progression from cats".

After the conclusion of Seekers, the team invited Inbali Iselris, author of The Tygrine Cat, to write a new series about dogs. After joining the Erin Hunter team, she spent more time with her dog, Michi, watching his behavior closely. Some of his mannerisms gave her material to develop the characters of Lucky and his companions.

While other series published under the name Erin Hunter had their preliminary plots written by a single author, a different approach was taken for the Survivors series. The whole team created a detailed story outline and developed the characters together. Then, the writing itself is done by a single author.

== Books ==
=== The Original Series ===
The original series follows golden retriever Lucky. Lucky was once a domestic dog, but when a large earthquake strikes and kills all the humans in the area, he is lost in a destroyed world and must join up with a pack of other former domestic dogs for protection.

The Empty City (21 August 2012)

A Hidden Enemy (29 April 2013)

Darkness Falls (3 September 2013)

The Broken Path (11 February 2014)

The Endless Lake (3 June 2014)

Storm of Dogs (10 February 2015)

=== The Gathering Darkness ===
The Gathering Darkness follows Lucky's foster daughter, Storm, a Doberman Pinscher, as she grows up and discovers who she is meant to be.

A Pack Divided (13 October 2015)

Dead of Night (7 June 2016)

Into the Shadows (7 February 2017)

Red Moon Rising (3 October 2017)

The Exile's Journey (26 June 2018)

The Final Battle (5 February 2019)

=== Novellas ===
On 5 May 2015, three novellas previously published as e-books were released together in a book called Tales from the Packs.

Alpha's Tale (originally released 29 April 2014)

Sweet's Journey (originally released 10 February 2015)

Moon's Choice (originally released 5 May 2015)

== Themes ==
Gillian Philip has said that a main theme of Survivors is "fitting in", as Lucky is a loner at heart and feels out of place in his pack. Philip says that the theme is especially relevant to many of the young readers, who are trying to find "their own place in the world and at the same time keeping hold of their new identity." Philip has also said that an advantage of writing stories is that "you can do all the romance and war and friendship and loyalty. You can do all that human stuff through animals." She has said that an advantage of writing about dogs is that they "are so much less self-reliant than cats," which she believed would "make for some good stories." Another main theme of the series is the complex canine pack structure that is similar to a human family.

== Critical reception ==
Reviews of Survivors were initially positive, but began to take on a more negative tone as the series progressed. Booklist enjoyed the "fast-moving" plot and the characterization of the first book. The review also stated it was a "promising start" to the Survivors series. Kirkus Reviews gave the novel a starred review, writing, "Hunter expertly explores the tensions between responsibility and freedom; risk and safety; and loyalty and acceptance". The reviewer goes on to say that Lucky's point-of-view made "even the most mundane or familiar seem alive with magic". The Horn Book Magazine criticized the first book for its large number of characters, but added that its "action-packed suspense" makes a "promising start" to the series. Voice of Youth Advocates stated that while the terminology used may puzzle readers, that the cliffhanger ending will leave readers "eagerly awaiting" the next book. The second book received another starred review from Kirkus Reviews, calling it "perfectly crafted". Booklist commented on the cliffhanger, stating that it will leave "avid" fans waiting for the next installment, but many readers will be "jarred" by the lack of a satisfying conclusion. The Horn Book Magazine writes that "the large number of characters is hard to keep track of" but states that Lucky's dilemma "adds suspense". King County Library System comments on the large number of characters, but says that the action will "please fans", calling Lucky a "sympathetic protagonist". It repeats the statement in a review for the fifth book The Endless Lake, and comments again on the number of characters in a review for the sixth book, Storm of Dogs.

The Horn Book Magazine praised the first book of the second arc, A Pack Divided, calling it a "winsome, adventurous installment" in the series. It stated that new readers would have trouble tracking the characters and backstories in a review for the second book, but comments that "Hunter devotees will appreciate how the dogs' saga deepens in this Survivors spin-off series".
