= Kate Cary =

British novelist (born 1967)

- Born: 4 November 1967 (age 59) outside Birmingham, England
- Occupation: Writer
- Children: Jo
- Writing career
- Pen name: Erin Hunter (shared)
- Genre: Fantasy
- Notable works: Warriors; Seekers; Bloodline
- Website: katecary.co.uk

Kate Cary (born 4 November 1967 in Birmingham, England) is an author, most well known for her work on the Warriors series.

== Works ==
=== Warriors ===
Cary was a contributor to the pen name Erin Hunter from 2003 until her retirement from the writing team in 2024. Cary wrote Into the Wild, Fire and Ice, The Sight, The Last Hope and Bluestar's Prophecy, among several other titles in the series. She stated that she becomes attached to the characters of the novels and usually feels distraught when writing death scenes. She also suggests that Loch Lomond offers her the inspiration for ThunderClan's territory in the novels.

=== Bloodline ===
Cary is also the single author of a series entitled Bloodline. The first Bloodline book was written in 2005, simply entitled Bloodline. It is an unofficial sequel to Dracula and is an epistolary novel taking place during World War I. Kirkus Reviews praised its plot twists, but wrote that the novel had flat characterization. She also wrote a sequel titled Bloodline: Reckoning in 2007. Kirkus Reviews wrote that bad pacing and characterization hurt the story, but the tension is kept high by bluffs and mysteries.

== Biography ==
Cary was born outside Birmingham on 4 November 1967. She wrote her first book when she was four years old, and has been enthusiastic about writing ever since. Cary stated that she has loved cats since the age of 6. She attended King Edward VI High School for Girls in Edgbaston, later moving to Surrey to study History at Royal Holloway, University of London (RHUL), where she graduated in 1989. After leaving the university, she began sending her books to publishers, regularly being rejected. Eventually, she discovered a small publisher who hired her to write "how to" and activity books. In 2003, Cary sent a writing sample to Victoria Holmes at Working Partners. Holmes offered her a position writing for the Warriors series, where she would share the workload with Cherith Baldry and Holmes herself in order to keep up with the publishing schedule.

Cary moved to Scotland in 1992. She has one child, Jo, born in 1997. Cary returned to England in 2004, where she currently resides.

== BlogClan ==
Cary created an unofficial website for the Warriors series called BlogClan. For several years, she regularly posted on the site. In recent years, she has taken a break from the site, and delegated site moderators as volunteers to run the site in her absence.
