= Forest of Secrets =

2003 novel by Erin Hunter

- First edition cover
- Author: Erin Hunter
- Cover artist: Wayne McLoughlin
- Language: English
- Series: Warriors
- Genre: Children's literature Fantasy novel
- Publisher: Avon; HarperCollins
- Publication date: 14 October 2003
- Publication place: United States; United Kingdom
- Media type: Print (hardback & paperback)
- Pages: 336
- ISBN: 978-0-06-052561-3
- OCLC: 55800667
- Preceded by: Fire and Ice
- Followed by: Rising Storm

Forest of Secrets is a children's fantasy novel, the third book in the original Warriors series, written by Cherith Baldry under the pen name of Erin Hunter. The plot is about Fireheart, a ThunderClan warrior, attempting to prevent his best friend Graystripe from falling in love with Silverstream, whom Graystripe is not allowed to fall in love with. Silverstream later dies giving birth to Graystripe's kits. When RiverClan claims the kits, Graystripe makes the difficult decision to join RiverClan. Fireheart also becomes deputy after Tigerclaw, the deputy, attempts to kill the leader, Bluestar. The main theme of the book is forbidden love. Forest of Secrets takes place in a fictional forest based on many natural locations.

The book was first published in the United States as a hardcover on 14 October 2003. It was later published in paperback and as an e-book, and in countries such as the United Kingdom and Canada. It has also been translated into other languages such as Japanese, French, and Russian. The book received positive reviews from trade publications such as Horn Book Review and Booklist, which praised the plot line of divided loyalties, betrayals, trust and the balance between the plot and everyday life.

== Development ==
Holmes remembers that while editing Forest of Secrets, she thought: "Hang on, this is turning into something special". While coming up with the idea of Bluestar giving up her kits to become leader, she remembers "sitting at my keyboard, tapping away to unpeel the layers of emotion that must have led to her momentous decision, and suddenly realizing how real and vital the Clans' world had become to me". After that, Holmes says that the plot seemed to write itself out. HarperCollins requested Holmes to produce a book every three months. Upon hearing this, Holmes invited Cherith Baldry into the team in order to keep up with the schedule. Holmes says she chose Baldry because "her natural writing style was quite close to mine and Kate's, so I knew that Cherith's voice would fit".

== Synopsis ==
=== Setting ===
Forest of Secrets is set in the same fictional forest as the previous two books in the series. The forest is home to four Clans of wild cats. The four Clans are ThunderClan, WindClan, RiverClan and ShadowClan. Each Clan has their own territory which they live in.

The forest is based on New Forest in England. The setting was also influenced by Loch Lomond in the Scottish Highlands, and the Forest of Dean.

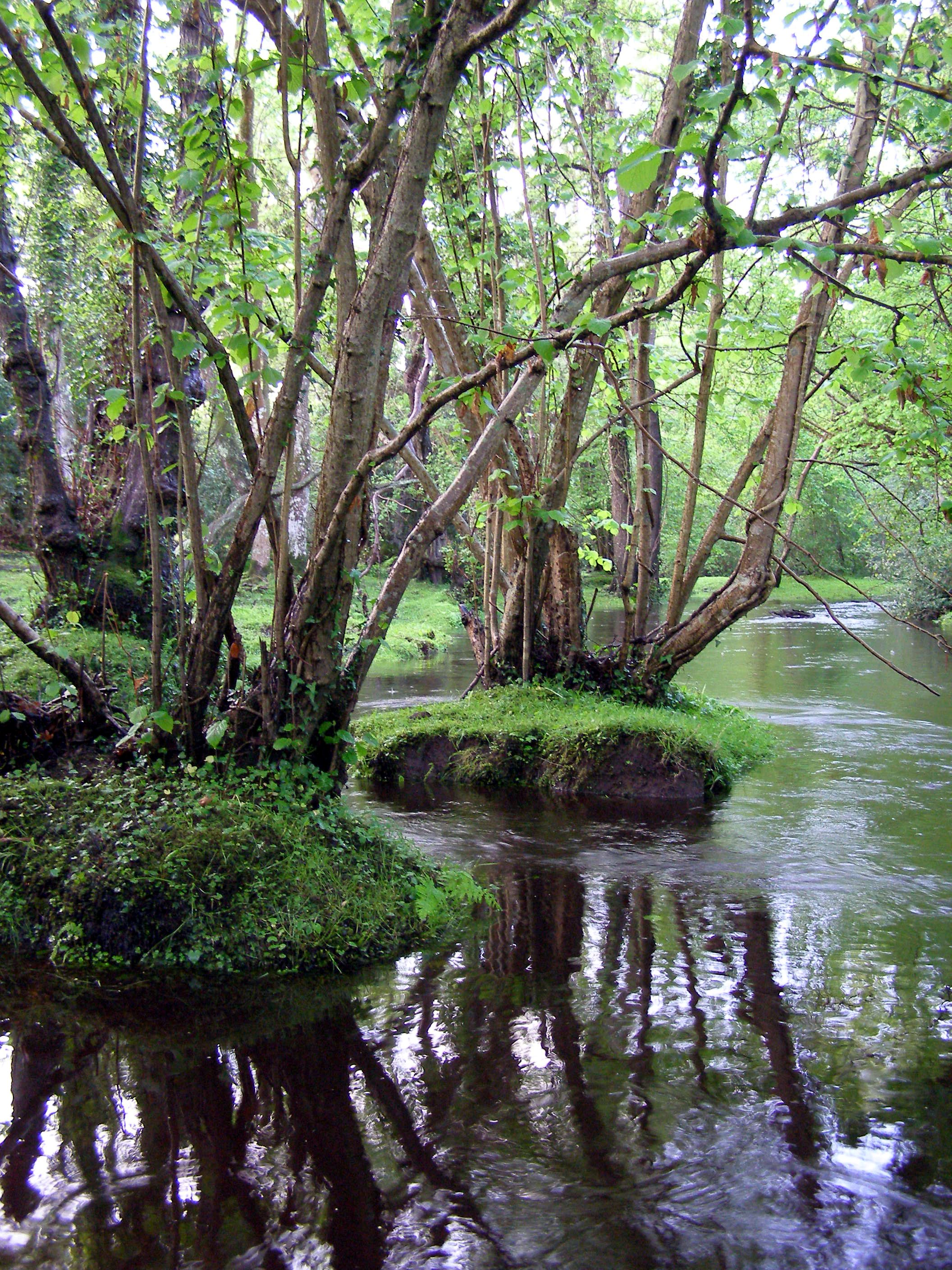
New Forest, England, which inspired the setting for the series

=== Plot ===
Fireheart is determined to uncover the truth about the Clan deputy, Tigerclaw, whom he believes is untrustworthy, whilst risking the trust of his leader, Bluestar, and even the possibility that she might suspect Fireheart himself as a traitor.

ShadowClan and WindClan eventually lead an invasion of the ThunderClan camp in an attempt to kill Brokentail whom ThunderClan is sheltering but are driven off.

Meanwhile, Fireheart's best friend, Graystripe, risks the trust of his entire Clan as he continues having a forbidden love affair with Silverstream, who is from RiverClan. Fireheart and Graystripe face danger from Tigerclaw, who has noticed Graystripe missing from camp many times. Silverstream eventually dies while giving birth to Graystripe's kits when they come early. Graystripe is left heartbroken. ThunderClan then learns about his forbidden love with Silverstream and feel that they cannot trust Graystripe anymore.

Later, Tigerclaw leads a band of rogues into ThunderClan camp, pretending to defend the Clan. During the battle, Tigerclaw corners Bluestar in her den and tries to kill her. Fireheart arrives just in time to save her and injures Tigerclaw. Bluestar is deeply shocked and shaken by Tigerclaw's mutiny, though she manages to announce Tigerclaw's exile from the Clan. Tigerclaw then asks Darkstripe, Longtail, and even Dustpelt the dark brown tabby tom if they want to join him in exile, but each cat refuses. With Bluestar having regained her trust over the cat that had exposed Tigerclaw's treachery, Fireheart is made deputy, although the announcement of the position is made after moonhigh, which is against Clan tradition. As a deputy, life is harder for Fireheart and things change rapidly. Fireheart is unsure whether he would be a good deputy, but he is sure that he has not seen the last of Tigerclaw.

At the end of the book, Graystripe, feeling torn between loyalties, heavy-heartedly decides to join RiverClan in order to raise his and Silverstream's kits. Fireheart attempts to have him reconsider, but this later proves to be unsuccessful. Fireheart is left heartbroken with the thought of losing his friend with whom he shared many adventures, and was the first Clan cat he had ever met since his days as a kittypet. He believes he will be lonely without his best friend. Yellowfang also poisons and kills Brokentail with yew berries for the injustices he has caused.

== Publication history ==
Forest of Secrets was first released in the US as a hardcover on 14 October 2003. It was then released as a paperback on 5 October 2004 and an e-book on 4 September 2007. Forest of Secrets has also been published in the UK as a hardcover and paperback and in Canada as a paperback. It has also been translated into other languages such as German, Japanese, French, Russian, and Korean. The Chinese version was released on 30 November 2008 and is packaged with a 3-D trading card featuring Tallstar.

== Themes ==
The main theme in the book is forbidden love. The warrior code, the rules the cats must follow, allows cross-Clan friendship, but not love. In order to meet each other, Silverstream and Graystripe have to sneak away from their camps. As a reviewer noted, "the tragic death of Graystripe's mate as she's giving birth and his betrayal of the Clan by loving a cat from an enemy Clan bring the simmering tensions to a boil as both groups claim rights to the kits."

== Critical reception ==
Forest of Secrets has received positive reviews. School Library Journal compared the book to a "Greek drama, with its huge cast of characters (a chart of allegiances is included), intrigues, divided loyalties, star-crossed lovers, and parents murdering their offspring." The review also commented on the violent battle scenes and how fans would be waiting impatiently for the next book. A review from Booklist also praised the book writing how "a devastating flood, shifting alliances between clans, treachery within and without ThunderClan, and attempted murder" create "another dynamic episode sure to please series fans". Horn Book Review also gave a positive review praising how the author is able to balance the book's conflicts and the everyday lives of the Clan cats. Children's Literature wrote that the book "is filled with intrigue and adventure". The review also recommended it to fantasy and cat-lovers.
