= Warriors (novel series) =

Juvenile fantasy series by Erin Hunter

- From left to right: Boxed sets of Warriors: The New Prophecy and Warriors: The Prophecies Begin
- Warriors: The Prophecies Begin (2003–2004); Warriors: The New Prophecy (2005–2006); Warriors: Power of Three (2007–2009); Warriors: Omen of the Stars (2009–2012); Warriors: Dawn of the Clans (2013–2015); Warriors: A Vision of Shadows (2016–2018); Warriors: The Broken Code (2019–2021); Warriors: A Starless Clan (2022–2024); Warriors: Changing Skies (2025–); Standalones
- Author: Erin Hunter (pen name)
- Genre: Children's and young adult fantasy
- Publisher: HarperCollins
- Published: 21 January 2003 – present

Warriors, also known as Warrior Cats, is a children's and young adult fantasy novel series. It is published by HarperCollins and written by multiple authors under the pen name Erin Hunter. Its nine story arcs chronicle the survival and adventures of five organized groups of feral cats, called Clans, as they interact with each other and outsiders.

The concept of Warriors and its first arc's storyline were created by Victoria Holmes. The novels were written by Kate Cary and Cherith Baldry, although the Erin Hunter team has changed and expanded since Holmes' retirement in 2017. Alongside novel arcs, the series' list of works includes original English-language manga, longer standalone novels, and novellas. A film was planned but later canceled; an animated series began development in 2026 and is set to air in 2028. An official Roblox game exists, and a standalone official video game was released on multiple platforms in October 2026.

The novels have received mixed reviews from critics. Many praised the action in the storylines, although the large cast of characters and the inaccessibility of the series to new readers has been a source of criticism. The novels explore some aspects of human society through the viewpoint of cats, such as politics, friendship, and religion. A major theme is the dangers of life in the wild, which includes inter- and intra-Clan conflict, natural hazards, and threats from human construction. Warriors has been translated into 38 languages and has sold over 90 million copies worldwide.

== Setting and universe ==
The Warriors universe centers around groups of feral cats who initially reside in a forest and later around a lake. Cats are split into four groups called Clans: (Note: The word "Clan" is capitalized in the series.) ThunderClan, WindClan, RiverClan, and ShadowClan. A lost fifth Clan named SkyClan also exists. Each Clan has adapted to their own terrain, and some Clans are named after their specialized abilities. The Clans follow a warrior code of honor.

Each Clan has a hierarchy that determines the name of each cat in the Clan. A cat's name consists of a prefix and a suffix; as the cat moves up in the hierarchy, the suffix changes. Young cats have the suffixes kit or paw, then receive a unique suffix when they become a warrior, and adopt the suffix star if they become a leader. Prefixes are often inspired by colors and the natural environment. The Clans have medicine cats, who are expert healers. The spirits of dead cats go to the afterlife, called StarClan, which is located in the night sky. StarClan grants leaders extra lives.

The cats use a stylized vocabulary to describe the world. Their seasons are called newleaf, greenleaf, leaf-fall, and leaf-bare; months are called moons; and distances are measured in animal lengths. Cars are known as monsters. Humans are known as twolegs, and are generally a threat; their housecats are called kittypets by Clan cats.

== Synopses ==
The first arc, The Prophecies Begin, was published from 2003 to 2004. In this arc, a housecat joins ThunderClan and is renamed Fireheart. He rises through the ranks of his Clan, proving that fellow warrior Tigerclaw is a traitor and a murderer. Tigerclaw is exiled, joins ShadowClan and is made its leader, Tigerstar. He brings the leader of a group of city cats, Scourge, to the forest. Scourge, who has reinforced claws, betrays and kills Tigerstar. Firestar, now leader of ThunderClan, temporarily unites all the Clans, who defeat Scourge and his gang. The second arc, The New Prophecy, was published from 2005 to 2006. In this arc, the Clans' territories are under threat from human construction, so a group of cats is sent to find a new home beyond the mountains, encountering and helping another group called the Tribe on the way. The Clans make their way to a lake, which becomes their new home.

The third arc, Power of Three, was published from 2007 to 2009. In this arc, a prophecy indicates that three cats will have mysterious powers. Two of the three sibling protagonists, Jayfeather and Lionblaze, have powers, but Hollyleaf does not. As they grow up, they investigate the history of the Clans and their family's secrets, while an outsider named Sol tries to manipulate the Clans for his own gain. The fourth arc, Omen of the Stars, was published from 2009 to 2012. The third cat prophesized in Power of Three, Dovewing, is born. Evil spirit cats, including Tigerstar, visit living cats in their dreams, in which they train them for an upcoming battle. Eventually, the spirits enter the real world, where they and their living acolytes fight against the other living cats and StarClan, who descend from the sky to help defeat the enemies. With StarClan's help, the enemies are defeated. Firestar dies while permanently destroying Tigerstar's spirit, and joins StarClan.

Dawn of the Clans is the fifth arc, published from 2013 to 2015. It is set before the events of The Prophecies Begin. In this arc, a group of cats from the Tribe leave in search of a better home. They arrive in the forest territories from The Prophecies Begin, and eventually establish themselves, forming the Clans. The sixth arc, A Vision of Shadows, was published from 2016 to 2018, and is set after Omen of the Stars. SkyClan, the lost fifth Clan, struggles to settle into a territory by the lake. Additionally, the Clans face constant attacks from a group of cats led by Darktail, who almost succeeds in destroying ShadowClan.

The Broken Code is the seventh arc, published from 2019 to 2021. In this arc, Ashfur, a corrupt StarClan cat, severs the connection between StarClan and the living Clans, and possesses ThunderClan's leader Bramblestar. The protagonists Bristlefrost, Shadowsight, and Rootspring defeat Ashfur, restore the connection with StarClan, save Bramblestar's spirit, and change the warrior code to prevent more tragedy from occurring in the future. The arc concludes with Bristlefrost sacrificing her life to kill Ashfur. A Starless Clan is the eighth arc, published from 2022 to 2024. In this arc, RiverClan's leader and deputy die in short succession, and even StarClan does not know who is to be the next leader. This places heavy responsibility on the young medicine cat and protagonist Frostdawn to choose one. There is growing unrest among the Clans regarding the changes made to the warrior code in The Broken Code, which allowed the protagonists Nightheart and Sunbeam to be mates despite having been born in different Clans. Eventually, Frostdawn chooses a new RiverClan leader and peace is restored.

Changing Skies is the ninth arc, published starting in 2025. In this arc, the Clans grapple with human construction around the lake. ThunderClan cat Moonglow suffers as she is haunted by her dead sister, Brightmorning. Meanwhile, there is unrest in SkyClan as several cats wish for the leader of SkyClan, Leafstar, to resign her position. Young SkyClan warrior Starlingflight is against this, and he begins to tell lies to further his position in the Clan.

== Development ==
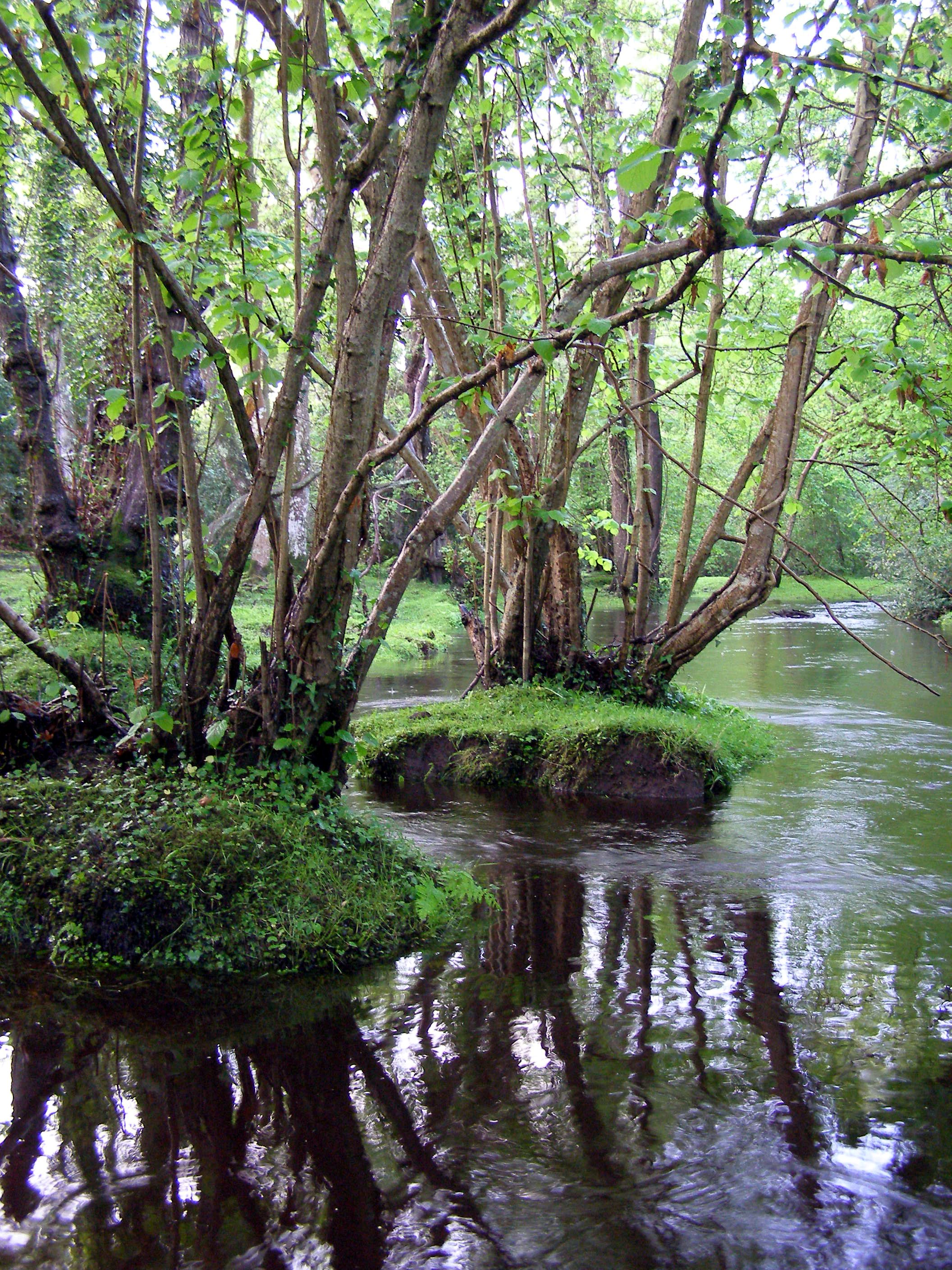
The New Forest in Hampshire, an inspiration for the setting of Warriors

Warriors is published by American and British company HarperCollins. HarperCollins originally asked editor Victoria Holmes to write a storyline for a single novel about a housecat who joins a Clan and becomes its leader by the end. Holmes initially found this difficult but wrote storylines and sent them to HarperCollins. After reading Holmes' ideas, a HarperCollins editor decided that she had drafted enough content to expand the novel into a six-book series. Holmes then used the storyline of the single novel as the overall story arc for the first six novels. When she finished writing a novel's outline, it was sent to Tui T. Sutherland for editing, who discussed it with Holmes, then sent it to Kate Cary and Cherith Baldry, who took turns writing the first draft. The finished novels are published under the pen name Erin Hunter. Holmes developed the fictional Clan territories, inspired by the varied environments of the New Forest in England. There are two maps of the territories at the beginning of each book, one showing the cats' points of view and the other a human point of view.

HarperCollins requested three novels for the second arc, so Holmes wrote the storylines of Midnight, Moonrise and Dawn to form a trilogy, finishing with the Clans finding a new home by the lake. She described the plot as a "relocation under pressure" story comparable to Watership Down. However, since the novels were selling well, HarperCollins once again increased the target to six books. For subsequent arcs, Holmes planned six-book storylines from the outset, each with a clear beginning and end. The series later expanded to include standalone novels known as Super Editions, field guides that provide extra information about the series' universe, original English-language manga, and novellas, some of which were written by Holmes and Sutherland. The manga, published by HarperCollins and Tokyopop, (Note: Since the shutdown of Tokyopop in 2011, manga volumes starting with A Shadow in RiverClan have been published in full color under the HarperCollins name alone.) were intended to be side stories, shorter than regular manga due to publishing schedule restrictions. The manga are written by Dan Jolley, using storylines by the Erin Hunter team, and illustrated by James L. Barry, among other illustrators. Shorter manga comics have been included in the last pages of some Warriors novels, including Super Editions.

Sutherland stopped editing after the fifteenth novel and went on to write a children's fantasy novel series about dragons titled Wings of Fire. Holmes stepped away from creating books after the fourth arc, and retired from the writing team in 2017 due to medical reasons. Since Holmes left, the team of writers and editors has expanded, and graphic novel adaptations of the main series have been created.

== Themes ==
=== Religion ===
The cats believe in StarClan, an ancestor-based religion. Spirit cats in StarClan act as guides to the living Clans, by communicating through prophecies, cryptic dreams and visions, and communion. StarClan resides in the night sky; Holmes decided on this because she felt that the cats' religious beliefs needed to "chime with their natural environment". Religion is important to such an extent that the cats' political system has been compared to a theocracy, and some cats who do not believe in StarClan are considered heretical by others. The cats' world structure also includes mythology, which involves stories about other felines such as leopards.

A Dangerous Path presents disillusionment when ThunderClan leader Bluestar loses her faith in StarClan and declares war on her ancestors, while her Clanmates are disturbed and unable to help her. Some cats go on spiritual quests to fulfill their perceived destinies. Several plotlines involve confusion about the source of visions.

=== Loyalty, treachery, and friendship ===
The Prophecies Begin features themes of friendship, loyalty, and treachery. Firestar's friends help his Clan accept him by the end of Into the Wild. However, in Fire and Ice, Firestar feels torn between loyalty to his family and his Clan. Meanwhile, he must face dangers arising from treachery inside the Clan: fellow warrior Tigerstar assassinated the Clan's second-in-command and Firestar is the only one who knows. Firestar has to discern who can be trusted in his Clan. Eventually, he proves Tigerstar's treachery which leads to Tigerstar's banishment from ThunderClan. Tigerstar's actions fragmented the integrity of the Clan, their trust in each other, and their leader's faith in StarClan.

Despite normally being rivals, the Clans may temporarily unite when under a shared threat. The New Prophecy features a group of cats from different Clans working together to accomplish a common goal and becoming friends in the process. In A Starless Clan, a group of cats from each Clan is sent to collect healing herbs to cure a dangerous disease. According to a School Library Journal reviewer, the ending of SkyClan's Destiny proves that loyalty and compassion are desirable traits. Furthermore, Kirkus Reviews wrote that Winds of Change shows "the dangers of political isolationism and how easily the seeds of mistrust are sowed".

The cats' personal relationships sometimes conflict with their loyalty to the Clan. ThunderClan warrior Graystripe falls in love with a RiverClan cat in Forest of Secrets, which his Clanmates consider treacherous, as loving a cat from another Clan is banned by their society's rules. However, many generations later, switching Clans to be with a mate is officially authorized, which forces the main characters of A Starless Clan to decide whether their loyalties belong to their Clans or their mates.

=== Violence and environmental destruction ===
The Clans face environmental hazards such as floods, fires, droughts, and more throughout the series. These natural dangers present important life lessons to Clan cats, and can be perceived as challenges that the characters must overcome. Many cats are injured or killed by these dangers. The cats prepare for and respond to nature's dangers, often aided by StarClan's guidance. StarClan sometimes also uses natural dangers as warnings of worse things yet to come. These hazards can increase a Clan's sense of community. Sometimes, they may even incite the Clans to work together. Humans and their construction also pose a danger to the Clans and the environment, as human deforestation destroys the Clans' territories and forces them to relocate. In addition, in Changing Skies, humans poison water sources used by the Clans.

The lives of Clan cats include sudden and violent deaths, as cats are frequently maimed, killed, or weakened by illness. Lethal battles between the Clans add to the violence. In Fire and Ice, Firestar internally appreciates fighting for his Clan, although the fighting does not fix his Clan's problems. Conflict in the series is often caused when the Clans do not have enough food, which leads to competition. Inter-Clan violence is increased by the cats' fluid borders, which are rooted in simple natural formations like rivers. Sometimes, Clans fight each other for hunting rights and territory. In Fire and Ice, ThunderClan warrior Graystripe's RiverClan mate dies while giving birth, leading to inter-Clan hostility as both ThunderClan and RiverClan claim rights to the kittens. In A Starless Clan, RiverClan's second-in-command disappears and is found dead in a canyon, which RiverClan is unable to explain, causing distrust within the Clan. Individual cats are sometimes horrified by the cruelty of others, such as when Tigerstar's mate Sasha was upset by his violent tendencies. Dogs are also a threat. In A Dangerous Path, Tigerstar encourages a prey-thieving dog pack to chase down and kill his former Clanmates. ThunderClan's leader Bluestar dies fighting these dogs. Kirkus Reviews wrote that the violent description of a mother cat being torn apart by dogs in A Starless Clan may be disturbing to sensitive readers.

Following Bluestar's death, Firestar becomes leader of ThunderClan in The Darkest Hour. In an attempt to force all the Clans to join one united Clan, ShadowClan leader Tigerstar recruits Scourge, who ends all of Tigerstar's StarClan-given lives with his reinforced claws by rupturing "seven major organs", according to Holmes. She called this death "the most violent of any of the death scenes in Warriors, and not one I would repeat". She has stated that "the safe space offered by an open book" introduces readers to both negative and positive experiences, and added: "I will always try to present an element of hope at the end of the saddest stories".

=== Territory, Clan politics and belonging ===
The series presents human concepts of politics from the point of view of cats. The anthropomorphization of the cats allows them to agree on a set of moral principles, and to use resources in their territory more effectively. The word "Clan" is capitalized in the books to show that each Clan is more than just a group of cats, as they have connections to their territory and religion. Name changes are used to represent important milestones in an individual's life.

Clan politics reinforce the cats' instinct to territorialize. The cats' perspective on territory is a mix of animal instinct (territoriality) and human territory. The inclusion in each book of two maps of the same location, from cat and human perspectives, superimposes these concepts, which dictates what the Clans need from their surroundings over the course of the series. Each Clan's culture is shaped by their territory, which in turn affects how they use it. The Clans' different cultures make their individuals unique.

Two major themes are xenophobia and the nature versus nurture debate. This is exemplified by Firestar's journey to fit into ThunderClan in The Prophecies Begin. Initially, ThunderClan cats criticize his housecat upbringing, but he is gradually accepted and learns to fit into the Clan. Some ThunderClan cats still doubt Firestar's loyalty after he has proven himself, as they believe loyalty is decided from the moment of birth. However, Firestar influences the Clans' perception of non-Clan cats and changes stereotypes against outsiders by proving himself a loyal warrior. A prevalent message is that upbringing and experience are more important than origin. In The Darkest Hour, Firestar unites the four Clans to defeat Scourge. His former leader's spirit tells him that "[e]ven though you are not forestborn, you have the heart of a true Clan cat".

== Reception ==
=== Critical reception ===
==== Main series ====
The first novel in the first arc, Into the Wild, was generally well received, with critics calling it exciting, suspenseful and thoroughly engrossing. The Mary Sue stated that "Into the Wild creates a world that sucks you in and makes you want to live there". Publishers Weekly wrote that it would please readers who wonder "what dreams of grandeur" their pet cat may have. Several critics compared it to Brian Jacques' book series Redwall, although School Library Journal (SLJ) commented that it was less elegantly written. However, SLJ also praised Into the Wild's worldbuilding for being "intriguing" and protagonist for being "engaging".

The next novels in the first arc received mixed reviews. Critics were divided in their opinions on Fire and Ice: while Kirkus Reviews (Kirkus) stated fans would be on edge for the next installment and Booklist praised the characters' personalities, SLJ called the characterizations flat and the storyline predictable. Forest of Secrets was called "exciting" and "dynamic" by critics, and Booklist said that Rising Storm tells a "suspenseful adventure story". The Mary Sue called A Dangerous Path, and the first arc as a whole, "a masterclass in rising tension"; Booklist also stated that A Dangerous Path has compelling intrigue. Rachel Tolleson, writing for The Mary Sue, stated that The Darkest Hour's villain Scourge is "one of the best villains" in young adult literature, adding that he may be "one of the most badass cats" in Warriors, as well as praising the final battle between the cats.

The second arc received primarily positive reviews. The Mary Sue called Midnight a "major shift" for Warriors, adding that its plot "hits hard". Kirkus stated that Midnight has a fine plot, but, as with other novels in the second arc, is marred by the fastidiousness of its writing style. The second arc's audiobooks are spoken by Nanette Savard, whose work AudioFile commended as "astonishing" and "crisp and clear". Later arcs received primarily negative reviews. A Starless Clan's first three novels were reviewed by Kirkus, who stated that the first book has too much information in each chapter, and that the third book's quality "plummets" towards the end, although a dialogue between a mother and her daughter in the second book is still "particularly poignant". Kirkus called the first novel in Changing Skies a "strong start" to the new arc, whereas the second novel is an "uninspired placeholder".

==== Manga and graphic novels ====
The manga have received mixed reviews from critics. Multiple reviews pointed out that the art style is more realistic and detailed than that of typical manga and is more similar to that of graphic novels. The art has been praised for bringing out the characters' expressive personalities by SLJ and Kirkus. SLJ stated that artist James L. Barry has a "knack for drawing cats". However, Kirkus also called A Thief in ThunderClan overall "lackluster", and in another review SLJ called the overall illustrations somewhat basic. A Clan in Need and SkyClan and the Stranger were New York Times Manga Best Sellers in 2009, 2010, and 2011.

The graphic novel adaptations of The Prophecies Begin have received both praise and criticism from Kirkus. A review of Volume 1 praised the "vivid colors", the "dramatic action sequences" and the "appealingly expressive feline faces". A review of Volume 2 criticized the difficulty of visually recognizing characters, noting that the authors chose to include extras, making the characters more difficult to keep track of. A review of Volume 3 stated that graphic novel's visual format "suits the violent, dramatic storyline". SLJ stated that the "unique" and "vibrant" colors could help introduce the series to new readers.

==== Other standalones ====
The first Super Edition standalone is Firestar's Quest, which was received mostly positively. Booklist stated that although it is much longer than previous Warriors books, established fans can enjoy the scale and action of the plot. Publishers Weekly stated that fans would be excited to read Firestar's Quest". A review of SkyClan's Destiny by SLJ also noted the length of Super Editions, and praised the "skillfully developed" characters which present a "range of emotions and thoughts". Despite Ivypool's Heart featuring an overall heavy story that includes grief and ominous visions, it also features smaller personifications of the cats which add lightness to its tone, according to Kirkus. SLJ wrote that the field guide Cats of the Clans is confusing to new readers for relying heavily on previously published material, although it features "spectacular" full-color portraits of Clan cats, portraying them as "exciting, vibrant, and unique".

=== Worldbuilding and writing style ===
Told through alternating narratives, the writing style of the Warriors books uses stylized vocabulary to describe the real world from a cat's point of view. Several reviewers criticized the repetitive use of meowed and mewed instead of said, as well as the large cast of characters with confusing and similar names. (Note: Attributed to multiple sources: Kirkus Reviews; Kirkus Reviews; Kirkus Reviews; School Library Journal) By contrast, Book Riot stated that the "rich and sensory detail" of the writing hooks the reader into the point-of-view of a cat, citing how cars are described "in such a way that a human never would". Kirkus has praised the "balance of catlike and human behaviors" in the writing, and called the cats' description of a carnival funny, while still criticizing the prose as confusing and inaccessible. While explaining the series' worldbuilding, Fantasy Faction likened Warriors to Watership Down "but with cats instead of rabbits".

Bustle praised the details in the maps and character lists, which Publishers Weekly stated "add to the charm", praising the "fanciful" names of characters such as Bluestar and Bramblepaw. Booklist noted that the character list in The Sight is four pages long, describing Warriors as a remarkably complex fictional empire. The New York Times wrote that Warriors is a "hit with young readers, in part, because of the sprawling universe [it] open[s] up".

=== Cultural impact ===
Warriors has a dedicated online fanbase; fans have been discussing the series online on fan-made websites as early as 2003. The official Warriors website encourages readers to participate in "CreatorClan" challenges, in which they create fanart, fanfiction, and fan characters. A fan-made animated adaptation of Warriors exists, titled SSS Warrior Cats. Inspired by the cats' naming conventions, some fans create warrior names for themselves and others.

=== Awards and nominations ===
Into the Wild was one of Booklist's Top 10 Fantasy Books for Youth of 2003. In 2006, Warriors was nominated for Publishers Weekly's annual "Off the Cuff" awards, and Into the Wild was nominated for the Pacific Northwest Library Association's Young Reader's Choice Award. The Sight was placed sixth on Amazon's Best Books of 2007 in the Middle Readers category. Warriors was on the New York Times Children and Young Adult's Best Seller List for a peak of 119 weeks in November 2014.

== Other media ==
=== Canceled film ===
In October 2016, Variety announced that Chinese film company Alibaba Pictures had acquired the rights to a film adaptation of Warriors, following a deal with Four Trees Media (Note: Formerly known as Coolabi Group.) signed at the Frankfurt Book Fair. Later that year, The Hollywood Reporter revealed that David Heyman would produce the film. The "live-action film with computer-generated characters" was set to adapt The Prophecies Begin into a "unified story" following Firestar's journey to "[earn] his place in spite of great prejudice against him". In 2018, Variety announced that STX Entertainment would co-produce the film. The film was eventually abandoned.

=== Animated series ===
In June 2026, The Hollywood Reporter announced that Four Trees Media and Chinese company Tencent Video had approved an animated adaptation of The Prophecies Begin with A. C. Bradley as showrunner and Rodrigo Blaas as director. The series is planned to debut in 2028 on Tencent Video and Disney+. Tencent Video revealed early artwork for the series at a fan meeting in Shenzhen, China, in August.

=== Video games ===
In 2021, an official Roblox game titled Warrior Cats: Ultimate Edition was released. As of August 2026, a planned expansion to the game titled Warrior Cats: Lake Territory is in development.

On 5 August 2026, the trailer for a turn-based role-playing game titled Warrior Cats: Clans of the Forest was shared on the Warriors Instagram account. The game released on 23 October 2026; according to IGN, it is available on PC (through Steam), PlayStation 5, Xbox Series X and S, Nintendo Switch, and Nintendo Switch 2. The game allows players to design a playable cat and live the cat's life by "building [a] personal legacy across the forest, populating the world with [a] web of stories, rivalries, and characters across multiple playthroughs". Four campaigns are available, based on the original four Clans.

== See also ==
- Xenofiction – Genre of speculative fiction
- Varjak Paw – 2003 book by S. F. Said
- The Call of the Wild – 1903 novel by Jack London
