= Victoria Holmes =

English author

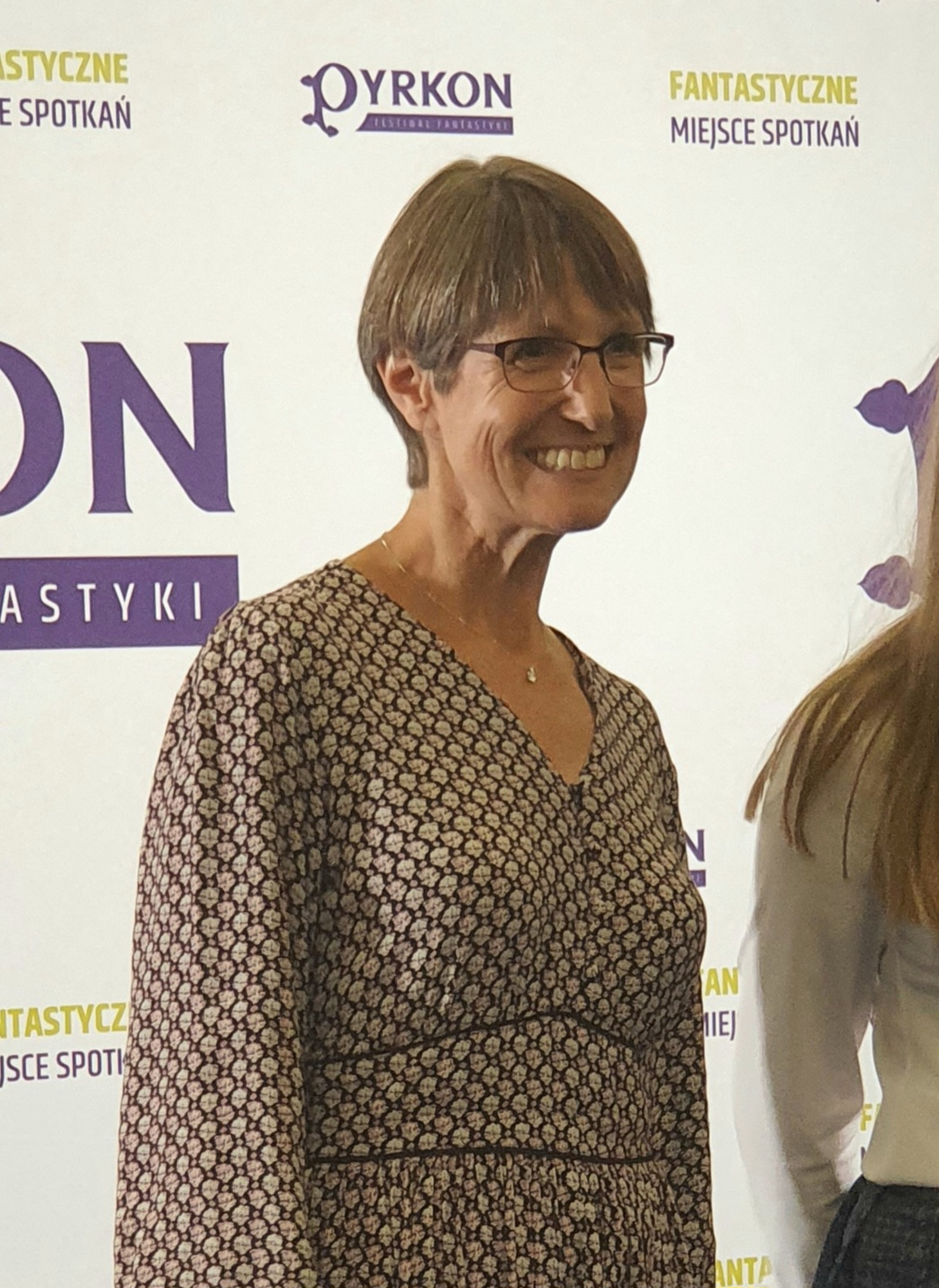
Victoria Holmes, Pyrkon (June 2025)

Victoria Holmes is an English author. She was the first author to write under the pseudonym Erin Hunter, creating the New York Times Bestselling series Warriors. She stepped back from writing Warriors in 2017.

== Biography ==
Victoria Holmes was born in Berkshire, England. She learned to ride horses at the age of two. She loved horses, and wrote many books about them. As a child she enjoyed reading and writing stories of her own when she had the time. She studied English at the University of Oxford, where the ancient buildings and sense of tradition inspired an interest in history in her. She currently works in London as a children's book editor and escapes to the English countryside whenever she can, where she rides horses and walks her dog, Missy.

== Books ==
Together with several others, Holmes has worked on Warriors, Seekers, Survivors and Bravelands, all published by HarperCollins, under the pen name Erin Hunter. Holmes creates the plots for the stories, then the other authors do the writing itself, often alternating between one another. Holmes is also in charge of maintaining series continuity and making sure that a consistent "voice" is maintained across the books.

Holmes is also the author of the Epic Horse series of novels: Rider in the Dark (2004), The Horse from the Sea (2005), and Heart of Fire (2006).

Currently Holmes is the co-author of the Hope Meadows series (Animal Ark Revisited) alongside veterinary surgeon Sarah McGurk. The series is published by Hodder in the UK.

Holmes stepped back from her involvement in the Warriors series after a cancer diagnosis in 2017.

Holmes announced on 28 November 2024 that she would briefly return to the Erin Hunter writing team in 2025 for an upcoming publication.
