= Erin Hunter =

Pen name for authors of fantasy novels

- Formation: 2003
- Type: Collective pseudonym of associated authors
- Purpose: Publication under one pen name
- Products: Warriors; Seekers; Survivors; Bravelands; Bamboo Kingdom; Renegades
- Key people: Victoria Holmes; Kate Cary; Cherith Baldry; Tui T. Sutherland; Dan Jolley; James L. Barry; Natalie Riess
- Publication: HarperCollins; Tokyopop
- Affiliations: HarperCollins; Working Partners

Erin Hunter is a collective pseudonym used by authors affiliated with HarperCollins publishing company and Working Partners, a London-based firm. The affiliated writers include Victoria Holmes, Kate Cary, Cherith Baldry, Clarissa Hutton, Inbali Iserles, Tui T. Sutherland, Rosie Best, Conrad Mason, and Michael Ford in the writing of several children's fantasy novel series which focus on animals and their adventures. Notable works include the Warriors, Seekers, Survivors, Bravelands, Bamboo Kingdom, and Renegades book series. For each book, Holmes creates the plot and the others take turns writing the books. Dan Jolley, though not an official Erin Hunter author, also writes the stories for manga published under the Hunter name. James L. Barry, Bettina M. Kurkoski, and Don Hudson are included under the pseudonym as the illustrators of the Warriors manga. Natalie Riess, Sara Goetter, and Sammy Savos are also included as the illustrators of the graphic novel adaptation of The Prophecies Begin and The New Prophecy, as well as Gibson Twist, who wrote for some of the graphic novel adaptations.

== History ==
In 2003, HarperCollins asked Victoria Holmes to write a fantasy series about feral cats, but, not being a reader of fantasy, she was less than enthusiastic despite her love of animals, including cats. After writing one storyline, Kate Cary was brought in to write the book as Holmes went behind the scenes to supervise details and edit the book. When the third Warriors book, Forest of Secrets, was being drafted, Cherith Baldry joined the Erin Hunter team. Tui T. Sutherland wrote the first Warriors field guide and became the fourth person under the name.

The name "Erin Hunter" was chosen for several reasons. If the authors used all of their own names, the books would be placed in different locations in a library, making them hard to find. Additionally, they wanted to pick a surname that would place the books very close to the Redwall series by Brian Jacques, which is a book series with a similar plot to Warriors. One of the authors suggested "Hunter", and the others felt that it was "perfect", because not only did it place the book series close to Jacques, but it evokes the image of a cat. Victoria Holmes suggested 'Erin' because it was one of her favorite names, and it was accepted for being a strong Celtic name and "not particularly girly".

== Authors ==
=== Victoria Holmes ===
Victoria Holmes was born in Berkshire, England. Holmes was the creator of Warriors, being the person whom HarperCollins originally requested to write it. After inviting Kate Cary to do the actual writing of the series, she moved behind the scenes to help edit and supervise details.

Holmes grew up on a farm in England. Later, she attended the University of Oxford, whose buildings "inspired an interest in history". She now lives in London, where she works as the editor for the series.

In 2011, the Bookperk website ran a special for signed copies of Sign of the Moon. Because Erin Hunter is not a real person, these books were instead signed by Victoria Holmes.

Following a diagnosis of cancer in 2017, Holmes stepped back from her involvement in Warriors.

=== Kate Cary ===
Kate Cary was the first author brought on board to write for the Warriors series. Holmes chose Cary to write the first Warriors book after Holmes had finished the storyline. She has written many of the books in the main arcs, as well as several Super Editions.

She was born in England on 4 November 1967. She later moved to Scotland where she lived for 12 years before going back to England, where she currently resides. Besides the Warriors series, she has also written the book Bloodline, and its sequel, Reckoning.

In late 2024, Cary left the Erin Hunter team to focus on other projects.

=== Cherith Baldry ===
Cherith Baldry was the second author brought to the Erin Hunter team. She was born on 21 January 1947 in Lancaster, England. She studied at the University of Manchester and St. Anne's College, Oxford. Holmes invited her to join when they were writing the third Warriors book, Forest of Secrets, after seeing her writing style and feeling that it was similar to Kate Cary's.

=== Tui T. Sutherland ===
Tui T. Sutherland was born on 31 July 1978 in Caracas, Venezuela. She currently lives in the United States. Her first credit to the Erin Hunter team was the field guide Secrets of the Clans. She wrote several other Warriors guides, as well as the first book in the Seekers series. Sutherland was also an editor of the Warriors series, until she quit editing to become a full-time writer. She went on to write the novel series Wings of Fire, among several other series.

=== Inbali Iserles ===
Inbali Iserles was born in Israel and is the author of the third, fifth and sixth books of the Survivors series: Darkness Falls, The Endless Lake and Storm of Dogs. She also publishes animal fantasy novels under her own name, including The Tygrine Cat and the Foxcraft trilogy.

=== Gillian Philip ===
Gillian Philip was born on 2 July 1964, and is the author of several books in the Survivors and Bravelands series. She lives in the northeast Scottish Highlands. Philip has toured the United States twice as the face of the Erin Hunter responsible for Survivors. In addition to Survivors, she has written several novel series under her own name. In June 2020, Philip was removed from the Erin Hunter team after announcing her support for J. K. Rowling's transphobic statements on Twitter.

=== Clarissa Hutton ===
Clarissa Hutton is the author of several Warriors novellas, including Thunderstar's Echo and the three stories in Path of a Warrior. She later joined the main series team when Cary left.

=== Rosie Best ===
Rosie Best is the author of The Exile's Journey, several books in the Bravelands series, as well as every book in the Bamboo Kingdom series. More recently, she has begun to write for the Warriors series as well.

=== Dan Jolley ===
Dan Jolley is the author of all the Warriors manga. He also writes for his own independent projects, as well as for video games from Ubisoft and Activision.

=== Gibson Twist ===
Gibson Twist is the author who wrote the ongoing graphic novel adaptation of The New Prophecy arc.

=== Conrad Mason ===
Conrad Mason wrote StormClan's Folly, and was mentioned in a 2026 article on the official Warriors website to also be the author of the upcoming 20th Super Edition.

=== Michael Ford ===
Michael Ford is the author of the Renegades series.

== Illustrators ==
=== James L. Barry ===
James L. Barry illustrated most of the Warriors manga, including the trilogy sets, modern standalones, and epilogue chapters in Super Editions.

=== Bettina M. Kurkoski ===
Bettina M. Kurkoski illustrated The Rise of Scourge.

=== Don Hudson ===
Don Hudson illustrated the Tigerstar and Sasha trilogy.

=== Natalie Riess ===
Natalie Riess is one of the illustrators of the graphic novel adaptation of the first Warriors arc, The Prophecies Begin.

=== Sara Goetter ===
Sara Goetter is one of the illustrators of the graphic novel adaptation of the first Warriors arc, The Prophecies Begin.

=== Sammy Savos ===
Sammy Savos is the illustrator of the ongoing graphic novel adaptation of the second Warriors arc, The New Prophecy.

== Works ==
=== Seekers ===
Seekers: The Original Series

1. The Quest Begins (2008) (Sutherland)
2. Great Bear Lake (2009) (Baldry)
3. Smoke Mountain (2009) (Sutherland)
4. The Last Wilderness (2010) (Baldry)
5. Fire in the Sky (2010) (Sutherland)
6. Spirits in the Stars (2011) (Baldry)

Seekers: Return to the Wild

1. Island of Shadows (2012) (Baldry)
2. The Melting Sea (2012) (Sutherland)
3. River of Lost Bears (2013) (Baldry)
4. Forest of Wolves (2014) (Baldry)
5. The Burning Horizon (2015) (Baldry)
6. The Longest Day (2016) (Baldry)

Manga

1. Toklo's Story (2010)
2. Kallik's Adventure (2011)

=== Survivors ===
Survivors: The Original Series

1. The Empty City (2012) (Gillian Philip)
2. A Hidden Enemy (2013) (Philip)
3. Darkness Falls (2013) (Inbali Iserles)
4. The Broken Path (2014) (Philip)
5. The Endless Lake (2014) (Iserles)
6. Storm of Dogs (2015) (Iserles)

Survivors: The Gathering Darkness

1. A Pack Divided (2015) (Philip)
2. Dead of Night (2016) (Best)
3. Into the Shadows (2017) (Philip)
4. Red Moon Rising (2017) (Philip)
5. The Exile's Journey (2018) (Best)
6. The Final Battle (2019) (Philip)

Novellas

1. Alpha's Tale (2014) (Phillip)
2. Sweet's Journey (2015) (Philip)
3. Moon's Choice (2015) (Philip)
4. Tales from the Packs (2015) (Bind-up of Alpha's Tale, Sweet's Journey, and Moon's Choice)

=== Bravelands ===
Bravelands

1. Broken Pride (2017) (Philip)
2. Code of Honor (2018) (Philip)
3. Blood and Bone (2018) (Philip)
4. Shifting Shadows (2019) (Philip)
5. The Spirit Eaters (2020) (Philip)
6. Oathkeeper (2020) (Philip)

Bravelands: Curse of the Sandtongue

1. Shadows on the Mountain (2021) (Best)
2. The Venom Spreads (2022) (Best)
3. Blood on the Plains (2022) (Best)

Bravelands: Thunder on the Plains

1. The Shattered Horn (2023) (Best)
2. Breakers of the Code (2024) (Best)
3. Realm of Lost Spirits (2024) (Best)

=== Bamboo Kingdom ===
==== Arc 1 ====
1. Creatures of the Flood (2021) (Best)
2. River of Secrets (2022) (Best)
3. Journey to the Dragon Mountain (2023) (Best)
4. The Dark Sun (2023) (Best)
5. The Lightning Path (2024) (Best)
6. Fire and Ash (2025) (Best)

==== Arc 2 ====
1. The Frozen Forest (TBA)
2. Silence of the Dragon (TBA)
3. Shoots of Spring (TBA)

=== Renegades ===
1. The Magic Awakens (2026) (Michael Ford)
2. The Broken City (2026) (Ford)
3. TBA
4. TBA

== Book development ==
In Warriors, Seekers, Bravelands, and Bamboo Kingdom a specific order is followed. First, Holmes, the editor, sends in the preliminary script and outline to whoever is writing the book. Then, the author develops Holmes' ideas into a single book which is sent back to Holmes for one last check-over and edit. After she finishes, she sends it to HarperCollins for publication. After Holmes stepped back from editing under the Erin Hunter name in 2017, a team of editors took over the writing of the preliminary scripts and the editing of drafts.

For the Survivors series, there was a different approach taken. The whole team got together and created a detailed story outline and developed the characters together. Then, the writing itself was done by a single author, who was still allowed to change something significant about the plot or characters if they felt that a certain character would not act a specific way.

== Writing style ==
With four different authors, Holmes has said that the book "'sounds' like Erin, because she has a very distinctive voice". She compares the style of the authors to a different language where a stray line or word can stick out. Holmes says that she is in charge of editing and making sure that the book sounds correct. Erin Hunter books are all told in a third person limited narrative, though the focal point character changes from series to series, book to book, and sometimes from chapter to chapter.
