= Warrior's Return =

2008 OEL manga by Erin Hunter

- First edition cover, showing Graystripe and Millie.
- Author: Erin Hunter
- Language: English
- Series: Warriors
- Genre: Children's, Fantasy novel
- Publisher: HarperCollins and Tokyopop
- Publication date: 22 April 2008
- Publication place: United States
- Media type: Print (Paperback)
- Pages: 112
- Preceded by: Warrior's Refuge

Warrior's Return is an original English-language manga volume written by Erin Hunter as part of the Warriors series. It is the third and final in a trilogy following Graystripe, a fictional wild cat trying to find his Clan. It was released on 22 April 2008. It is drawn by James L. Barry.

== Publication history ==
The three-part Graystripe manga series was announced as the first part of a partnership between Tokyopop and HarperCollins. Erin Hunter and Dan Jolley would write the stories and James L. Barry would illustrate it. After the release of The Lost Warrior and Warrior's Refuge, focus turned to the third volume. On the Warriors website, an excerpt was released, but was later removed. Warrior's Return was released as a paperback on 22 April 2008, the same day Outcast was released, a novel in the Warriors: Power of Three series. To promote these two stories, Erin Hunter went on tour in the US. She visited several bookstores across the states. Warrior's Return was also published in the UK and Canada. At the back of Warrior's Return were promotions for The Rise of Scourge, Cats of the Clans, Secrets of the Clans, and Firestar's Quest, all from the Warriors series, and The Quest Begins, from the Seekers series.

== Story ==
=== Setting ===
The cats from the Warriors series live separated as four Clans (called ThunderClan, WindClan, RiverClan, and ShadowClan). They believe in StarClan (ancestors who sometimes give them advice and prophecies). Humans, called Twolegs by the cats, are a threat. Graystripe, the focal point of the manga trilogy, is a cat from ThunderClan. During the events of Dawn, he is captured by Twolegs. The Graystripe trilogy has followed him as he tries to find his Clan. He has a traveling partner, Millie, a former kittypet (domestic cat) that has joined him.

=== Plot ===
Warrior's Return picks up from the previous volume, with Graystripe and Millie just having found the ruined ThunderClan camp. The duo leave it behind and find Ravenpaw (a former Clan cat) and Barley, loners introduced earlier in the series. Ravenpaw and Barley help them continue their quest to find the Clans before returning to their barn. Graystripe and Millie plan to go to the sun-drown-place (Atlantic Ocean), which was where Ravenpaw told them the Clans had planned to go.

On their travels, a fight emerges between Graystripe and Millie about how much help they can accept from Twolegs. At a gas station, Graystripe is hit by a car, and is nursed back to health by Millie and Diesel, a loner who lives by the gas station. As Graystripe recovers, he tries to confess that he is sorry to Millie, though Diesel gets in the way. Millie tells Graystripe that the fastest way of getting to the ocean (where they will find the Clans) is by a truck, which forces him to make a choice; to use Twolegs to help him find his Clan and go against the warrior code, or take longer to find his Clan. The duo decide to use the truck to get to the Clans. The volume concludes with Graystripe and Millie finding the Clans and Graystripe apologizing to Millie and also asking her to be his new mate. When Graystripe and Millie see the Clans in the middle of a Gathering, Firestar welcomes Graystripe and Graystripe introduces Millie.

== Characters ==
- Graystripe: A muscular gray tom who was separated from his Clan.
- Millie: A former house cat or "kittypet" who has come with Graystripe and befriended him on his journey back to his Clan.
- Ravenpaw: A former Clan cat, became a loner during The Prophecies Begin when Tigerstar (then Tigerclaw) threatened to kill him. Ravenpaw currently lives at the barn with Barley, another loner.
- Barley: A loner. He currently lives at the barn with Ravenpaw.
- Diesel: A friendly cat that lives at a gas station/truck stop.
- Firestar: Leader of ThunderClan (Graystripe's Clan), briefly appeared at the end of the story, also Graystripe's best friend.

== Critical reception ==
A review by School Library Journal praised the drawing that "captures the cats' expressive faces, action-packed battle scenes, and familiar surroundings as these animals travel through the realm of the Twolegs and recommended the book for "reluctant readers, manga fans, or "Warriors" enthusiasts". Booklist felt that the first two chapters would be confusing for new readers, but would still be able to understand what is going on after reading through the book.
