= The Quest Begins =

2008 novel by Erin Hunter

- The cover of The Quest Begins
- Author: Erin Hunter
- Cover artist: Wayne McLoughlin
- Language: English
- Series: Seekers
- Genre: Fantasy novel
- Publisher: HarperCollins
- Publication date: 27 May 2008
- Publication place: United Kingdom; United States
- Media type: Print (hardback & paperback)
- Pages: 293
- ISBN: 978-0-06-087122-2
- Followed by: Great Bear Lake

The Quest Begins is the first novel in the Seekers series. It was written by Erin Hunter, which is a collective pseudonym used by authors Cherith Baldry, Kate Cary, and Tui Sutherland and editor Victoria Holmes. The novel details the adventures of four bears, Toklo, Kallik, Lusa and Ujurak, who are stranded together in the wild and must learn to survive. The declining environment around the bears is a theme explored throughout the novel. The development of the Seekers series began as a result of a request from HarperCollins for another series about animals to the authors who wrote the Warriors series about feral cats under the name of Erin Hunter. The novel was published on 27 May 2008. The book sold well and had generally positive critical reception with reviewers suggesting the series would appeal to fans of Warriors.

== Development and publication ==
=== Conception ===
The Quest Begins and the Seekers series began as a request from HarperCollins, who wanted Victoria Holmes, editor and creator of the Warriors series that followed the adventures of feral cats, to write another series with animal characters. The company suggested dogs, but Holmes felt that dogs would be too similar in their behavior to cats. Both horses and dolphins were also considered but rejected because of horses' tendency to run away rather than fight, and the slowness of battles underwater, respectively. Holmes ultimately suggested a series about bears, noting their solitary lifestyles, minimal history of domestication, and great fighting potential as factors that attracted her to writing about them.

=== Publication history ===
The Quest Begins was introduced via HarperCollin's FirstLook Program in November 2007. Those who signed up for the program were granted early online access to the novel prior to its release in stores. The Quest Begins was published in hardback format on 27 May 2008, then as a paperback on 10 February 2009, and in e-book format on 6 October 2009. The novel has also been translated into Russian.

== Plot ==
The novel first follows Kallik, who lives with her mother and brother. While out on the ice, she is separated from her family when killer whales attack, forcing her to survive by herself. Kallik decides to go to a gathering place for polar bears that her mother told her about. There, she asks other polar bears if they have seen her family, but none of them have seen them. Kallik befriends another female bear named Nanuk, who helps Kallik around the area. However, Nanuk is killed in a helicopter crash when she and Kallik are being shipped back to the wild. Before she dies, Nanuk tells Kallik about a place where the ice never melts. Kallik sets off to find this place.

In a mountain range, Toklo's mother is bringing Toklo and his sickly brother to a river to teach them how to catch salmon, but when his brother dies, she suffers a mental breakdown and abandons Toklo. Left to fend for himself, he is chased by human hunters and meets another bear who is also being pursued by the hunters, Ujurak. Although Ujurak is injured, they are able to reach safety. Ujurak, then reveals himself to be a shapeshifter by transforming into a human and back. The two decide to continue traveling together.

Lusa is a pampered black bear living in a zoo. Despite being told that the wilderness is a harsh environment, she dreams of one day escaping the zoo and living outside. One day, Toklo's mother is brought to the zoo. She tells Lusa about her regret over abandoning her cubs, but that she was unable to find them after leaving them. Lusa resolves to find Toklo in order to deliver his mother's apology, and successfully escapes from the zoo. As the novel concludes, Ujurak and Toklo encounter Lusa.

== Writing and themes ==
The novel drew comparisons, sometimes unfavorably, to the Warriors series, with Holly Koelling from Booklist noting that "despite the change in species, much will be familiar to readers". However, the book's fantasy elements are lightly introduced in this series start. The Quest Begins has a focus on protecting the environment and in the many ways humans pose dangers to animals. The bears, by undertaking this quest, are forced to gain survival skills as they go along and to do so without the assistance of adults to mentor and guide them. Koelling noted that while the bears are anthropomorphized they also maintain bear-like qualities and characteristics.

== Reception ==
Reception to the novel was positive and many reviewers praised the realistic setting and behaviours of the main characters. Koelling noted how the novel has a balance of cute anthropomorphic characterisation and also gives a realistic view of how hard it is for the bears to survive on their own. Koelling also recommended the novel to Warriors fans. Kirkus Reviews had a more mixed review, noting fans of the genre would, "haunt the shelves for the next volume" despite little plot advancement due to the time spent introducing and developing the characters. In contrast, Jennifer-Lynn Draper in School Library Journal praised the novel's fast pace and Hunter's ability for, "creating and sustaining the adrenaline-charged mood".

The Quest Begins was a best seller appearing on Publishers Weekly's and The New York Times lists for multiple weeks. The novel was the 9th book chosen by Al Roker for his Al's Book Club on The Today Show with Holmes appearing on the show.
