= Dan Jolley =

American novelist and comic book writer

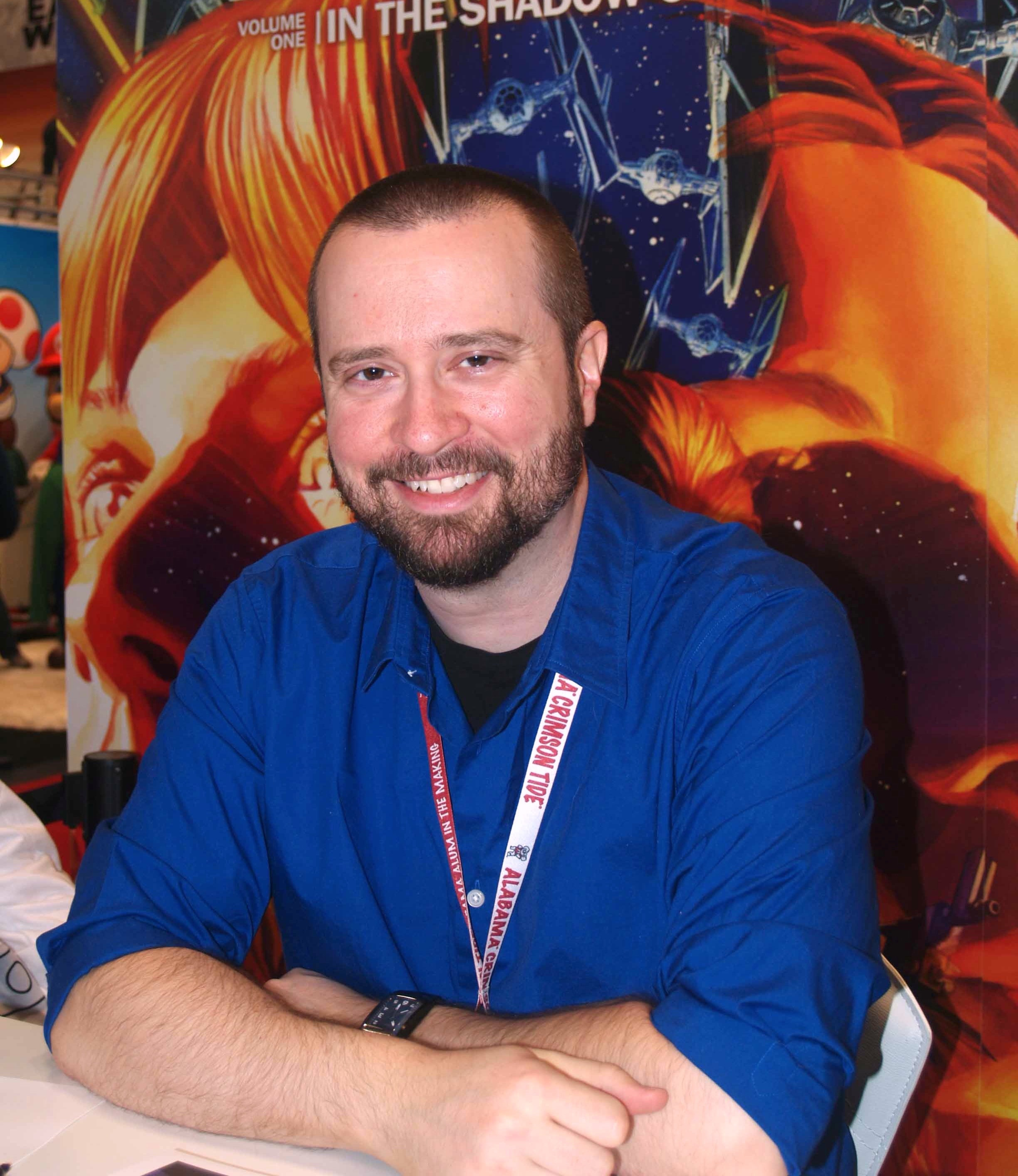
- Jolley at the 2013 New York Comic Con
- Area: Writer
- Notable works: Firestorm; Obergeist; JSA: The Liberty Files; Alex Unlimited

Dan Jolley is an American novelist and comic book writer. His comics work includes DC Comics' Firestorm and Graphic Universe's Twisted Journeys, a series of interactive fiction or gamebooks in graphic novel form, and his novel work includes the young-adult science fiction espionage series Alex Unlimited along with his international best selling novel, The Gray Widow's Walk, which is his first book in the Gray Widow trilogy that he publishes through Seventh Star Press. He created Jason Rusch, the second Firestorm, with artist Chris Cross.

== Career ==
Jolley began his writing career in the early 1990s. His limited series Obergeist was voted Best Horror Comic of 2001 by the magazine Wizard, and his DC Comics project JSA: The Unholy Three received an Eisner Award nomination for Best Limited Series of 2003.

His other comics include Bloodhound, a series about an investigator following a super-powered serial killer in the DC Universe.

May 2007 saw the debut of his first novel series, an original young-adult science fiction espionage story called Alex Unlimited, published by a joint venture of Tokyopop and HarperCollins.

Jolley wrote many manga novels for the Warriors series by Erin Hunter, including The Lost Warrior, Warrior's Refuge, Warrior's Return (the previous three all belonging to the Graystripe's Adventure trilogy) The Rise of Scourge, Into the Woods, Escape from the Forest, Return to the Clans (the previous three all belonging to the Sasha and Tigerstar trilogy), Shattered Peace, A Clan in Need, The Heart of a Warrior (the previous three belonging to the Ravenpaw's Path trilogy), The Rescue, Beyond the Code, After the Flood (the previous three belonging to the SkyClan and the Stranger trilogy), A Shadow in RiverClan, Winds of Change, Exile from ShadowClan, and A Thief in ThunderClan.

He also wrote the teen novelization of the 2008 film Iron Man.

Jolley was on the design team of Icarus Studios' post-apocalyptic MMORPG Fallen Earth. He writes for video games from Activision and Ubisoft.

== Works ==
=== Novels ===
- Star Trek SCE: Some Assembly Required, Pocket Books, New York, January 2002 (co-written with Scott Ciencin)
- Angel: Vengeance, Simon & Schuster, New York, August 2002 (co-written with Scott Ciencin)
- Alex Unlimited Book 1: The Vosarak Code, Tokyopop/HarperCollins, New York, May 2007
- Alex Unlimited Book 2: Split-Second Sight, Tokyopop/HarperCollins, New York, September 2007
- Iron Man Teen Novelization (motion picture novelization), HarperCollins, New York, March 2008
- Alex Unlimited Book 3: True Chemistry, Tokyopop/HarperCollins, New York, April 2008
- Transformers 2 Junior Novel (motion picture novelization), HarperCollins, New York, May 2009
- Gray Widow's Walk, Seventh Star Press, Lexington, May 2016
- Five Elements Book 1: The Emerald Tablet, HarperCollins, New York, October 2016
- Five Elements Book 2: The Shadow City, HarperCollins, New York, July 2017
- Five Elements Book 3: The Crimson Serpent, HarperCollins, New York, April 2018
- House of Teeth, Audible Originals, Seattle, December 2019
- Waterland- Aufbruch in die Tiefe, Fischer-Verlag, Germany, January 2020
- Waterland- Stunde der Giganten: Band 2, Fischer-Verlag, Germany, March 2021
- Waterland- Ozean in Flammen: Band 3, Fischer-Verlag, Germany, August 2021
- Waterland- Krieg der Fluten, Fischer-Verlag, Germany, March 2022
- The Storm, Falstaff Books, Charlotte, NC, September 2020
- Gray Widow's Web: The Gray Widow Trilogy Book 2, Falstaff Books, Charlotte, NC, October 2020
- Gray Widow's War: The Gray Widow Trilogy Book 3, Falstaff Books, Charlotte, NC, October 2020
- The Demon-Sleuth Scrolls Book One: The Runemaster Homicide, Falstaff Books, Charlotte, NC, September 2021
- The Demon-Sleuth Scrolls Book Two: The Black-Horned Grave, Falstaff Books, Charlotte, NC, August 2023
- The Demon-Sleuth Scrolls Book Three: The Runebearer Curse, Falstaff Books, Charlotte, NC, September 2024

=== Video games ===
- Fallen Earth (PC), Icarus Studios, September 2009
- Avatar: The Game (Nintendo DS), Ubisoft Montreal, December 2009
- Transformers: Cybertron Adventures (Wii), Activision/Next Level Games, June 2010
- Transformers: War for Cybertron (Xbox 360, PS3, PC), Activision/High Moon Studios, June 2010
- Transformers: Dark of the Moon (Xbox 360, PS3, Wii), Activision/High Moon Studios/Behaviour Interactive, July 2011
- Prototype 2 (Xbox 360, PS3), Activision/Radical Entertainment, April 2012
- Transformers: Fall of Cybertron (Xbox 360, PS3, PC), Activision/High Moon Studios, August 2012
- Transformers: Prime – The Game (Wii, Wii U, Nintendo 3DS), Activision/Nowpro, October 2012
- The Bureau: XCOM Declassified (Xbox 360, PS3, PC), 2K Games, August 2013
- Dying Light (Xbox One, PS4, PC), Warner Bros./Techland, January 2015
- Chronos (Oculus Rift), Gunfire Games, March 2016
- Mafia III (Xbox One, PS4, PC), 2K Games/Hangar 13, October 2016

=== Comics ===
- Universal Monsters: The Mummy, one-shot special, Dark Horse Comics, Milwaukie, 1992
- Aliens: Colonial Marines, two issues in ten-issue mini-series, Dark Horse Comics, Milwaukie, 1993
- Doctor Strange: The Flight of Bones, 4-issue mini-series, Marvel Knights, 1999
- JSA: The Liberty Files, DC Comics, 2000
- Lazarus 5, DC Comics, 2000
- JLA: Gods and Monsters (with Josh Krach), DC Comics, 2001
- Obergeist, Top Cow Productions, 2001–2002
- Purgatori, Chaos! Comics, 2002–2012
- Sabretooth: Mary Shelley Overdrive, 4-issue mini-series, Marvel Comics, 2002
- Superman Adventures, three issues, DC Comics, New York, 2002
- JSA: The Unholy Three, DC Comics, 2003
- G.I. Joe Frontline: Icebound, four-issue mini-series, Devil's Due/Image Comics, Chicago, 2003
- Micronauts, Devil's Due/Image Comics, Chicago, 2003-2004
- Voltron, Devil's Due/Image Comics, Chicago, 2003-2004
- Metal Hurlant: Worship Service, short story, Humanoids Comics, Los Angeles, 2004
- Vampirella: The Choir in the Mist, one issue, Harris Comics, New York, 2004
- Micronauts, 3-issue mini-series, Devil's Due, 2004
- Firestorm, DC Comics, 2004–2005
- Bloodhound #1-10 (with Leonard Kirk), DC Comics, 2004–2005
- G.I. Joe Vs. The Transformers I, two issues in five-issue mini-series, Devil's Due/Image Comics, Chicago, 2004
- G.I. Joe Vs. The Transformers II, four-issue mini-series, Devil's Due/Image Comics, Chicago, 2005
- Hell, Michigan, four-issue mini-series, FC9 Publishing, Morristown, 2005
- Angel: Choice Cuts, one issue in five-issue mini-series, IDW Studios, San Diego, 2006
- Warriors: Graystripe's Adventure: The Lost Warrior, HarperCollins, Tokyopop, ISBN 0061240206, 2007
- Warriors: Graystripe' Adventure: Warrior's Refuge, HarperCollins, Tokyopop, ISBN 006125231X, 2007
- Warriors: The Rise of Scourge, HarperCollins, Tokyopop, June 2008
- Warriors: Graystripe's Adventure: Warrior's Return, HarperCollins, Tokyopop, ISBN 0061252336, 2008
- Warcraft Legends: How to Win Friends, short story, Tokyopop, Los Angeles, August 2008
- Warriors: Into the Woods, HarperCollins, Tokyopop, September 2008
- Warcraft Legends: Miles to Go, short story, Tokyopop, Los Angeles, November 2008
- Warriors: Escape from the Forest, HarperCollins, Tokyopop, December 2008
- Warcraft Legends: Crusader's Blood, short story, Tokyopop, Los Angeles, March 2009
- Warriors: Return to the Clans, HarperCollins, Tokyopop, June 2009
- Warcraft Legends: Bloodsail Buccaneer, short story, Tokyopop, Los Angeles, June 2009
- World of Warcraft: Death Knight, Tokyopop, Los Angeles, November 2009
- Warriors: Ravenpaw's Path: Shattered Peace, HarperCollins, Tokyopop, November 2009
- Warriors: Ravenpaw's Path: A Clan in Need, HarperCollins, Tokyopop, March 2010
- Warriors: Ravenpaw's Path: The Heart of a Warrior, HarperCollins, Tokyopop, August 2010
- Warriors: SkyClan and the Stranger: The Rescue, HarperCollins, July 2011
- My Boyfriend Bites (My Boyfriend is a Monster #3), Lerner Books, Minneapolis, July 2011
- Warriors: SkyClan and the Stranger: Beyond the Code, HarperCollins, November 2011
- Warriors: SkyClan and the Stranger: After the Flood, HarperCollins, April 2012
- Wrapped Up in You (My Boyfriend is a Monster #10), Lerner Books, Minneapolis, May 2012
- Bloodhound: Crowbar Medicine, five-issue mini-series, Dark Horse Comics, Portland, October 2013
- Eerie: Invulnerable, short story, Dark Horse Comics, Portland, February 2014
- Terminator: Enemy of My Enemy, six-issue mini-series, Dark Horse Comics, Portland, February 2014
- The Savage Sword of Robert E. Howard: The Maid of Winter's Night, short story, Dark Horse Comics, Portland, July 2014
- LARP!, three 80-page graphic novels, Dark Horse Comics, Portland, May 2015
- Warriors: A Shadow in RiverClan, HarperCollins, June 2020
- Warriors: Winds of Change, HarperCollins, June 2021
- Warriors: Exile from ShadowClan, HarperCollins, June 2022
- Warriors: A Thief in ThunderClan, HarperCollins, June 2023

=== Educational comics ===
- Graphic Universe: Odysseus: Escaping Poseidon's Curse, Lerner Books, Minneapolis, June 2007
- Twisted Journeys: Escape From Pyramid X, Lerner Books, Minneapolis, July 2007
- Graphic Universe: The Smoking Mountain: The Story of Popocatepetl & Iztaccihuatl (An Aztec Tale), Lerner Books, Minneapolis, January 2008
- Twisted Journeys: The Time Travel Trap, Lerner Books, Minneapolis, February 2008
- Twisted Journeys: Alien Incident on Planet J, Lerner Books, Minneapolis, September 2008
- Twisted Journeys: Vampire Hunt, Lerner Books, Minneapolis, September 2008
- Graphic Universe: Pigling: A Cinderella Story (A Korean Tale), Lerner Books, Minneapolis, November 2008
- Twisted Journeys: Agent Mongoose & the Hypno-Beam Scheme, Lerner Books, Minneapolis, February 2009
- Graphic Universe: Guan Yu: Blood Brothers to the End (A Chinese Tale), Lerner Books, Minneapolis, March 2009
- Graphic Universe: Hero Twins: Against the Lords of Death (A Mayan Tale), Lerner Books, Minneapolis, March 2009
- Twisted Journeys: Shipwrecked on Mad Island, Lerner Books, Minneapolis, August 2009

=== Podcasts ===
- Sonic the Hedgehog Presents: The Chaotix Casefiles, Sega of America and Realm, 2026

=== Television ===
- DC: Heroes United, Genvid Entertainment, Tubi, 2024
- Cirque Berzerk, Nickelodeon Studios, Unproduced

== Awards ==
- Best Horror Story of 2001, Wizard Magazine Awards, for Obergeist
- Nominated for Best Mini-series of 2003, Eisner Awards, for JSA: The Unholy Three
