= Cherith Baldry =

British writer (born 1947)

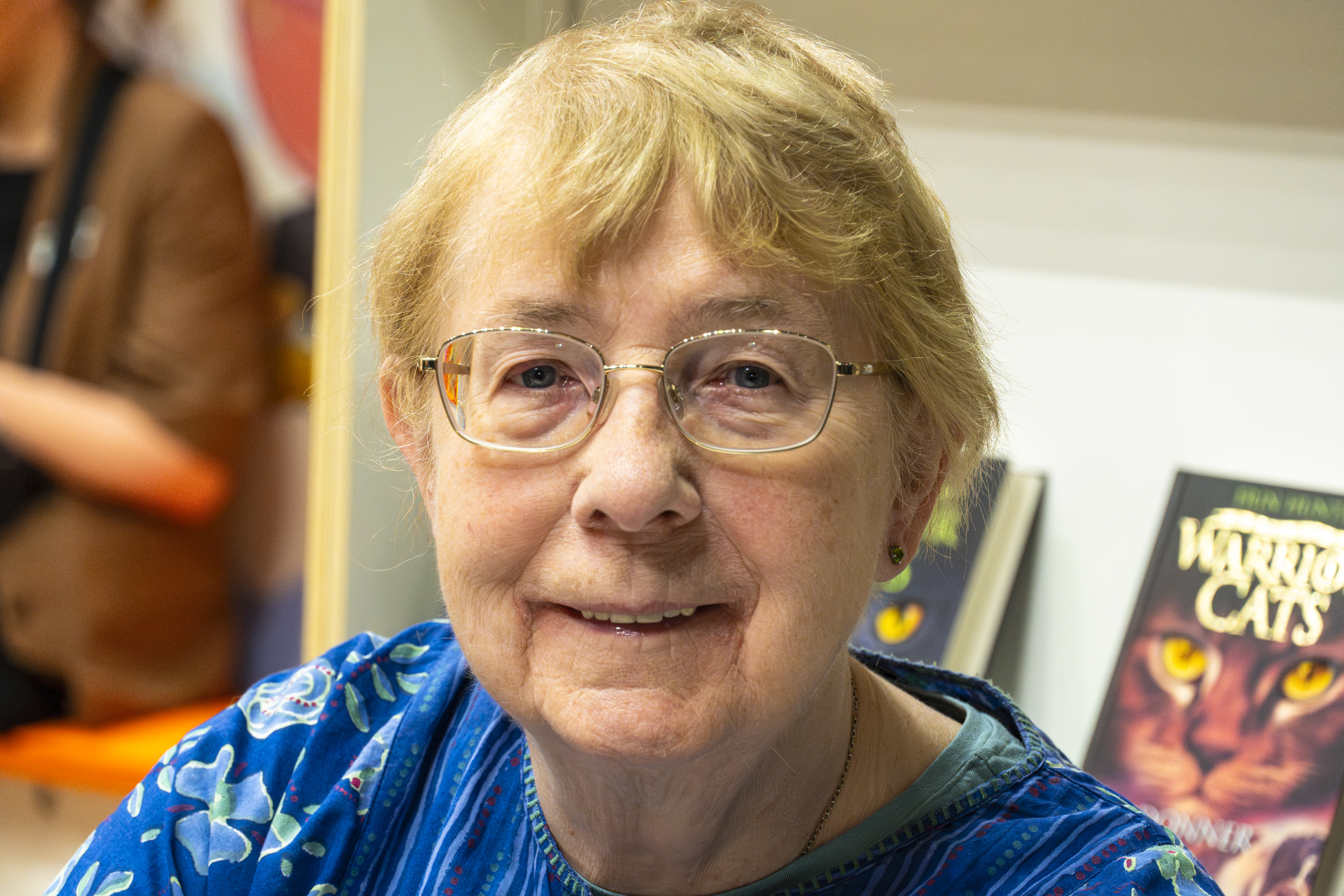
Cherith Baldry at the Frankfurt Book Fair 2025

Cherith Baldry (born 21 January 1947) is a British children's fiction and fantasy fiction writer. She also publishes under the pseudonyms Adam Blade, Jenny Dale, Jack Dillon, and Erin Hunter. She has also written several one-act plays.

== Biography ==
Baldry was born in Lancaster, England, and studied at Manchester University and St Anne's College, Oxford. She worked both as a teacher and a lecturer. She lectured in Fourah Bay College in Sierra Leone and taught in England. She is a member of and has published reviews in the British Science Fiction Association.

Baldry is one of seven authors who writes under the pen name of Erin Hunter. Baldry has written for Warriors, in which wild cats strive for peace in their territories, and Seekers, in which a group of four bears go on a journey together.

She currently lives in Reigate with her two cats, Bramble and Sorrel, who were the inspirations for two characters in the Warriors books (Brambleclaw and Sorreltail, respectively). She was married to the late Peter Baldry, a scientist, and has two sons, Will and Adam.

== Books ==
=== Eaglesmount trilogy ===
- The Silver Horn (2001)
- The Emerald Throne (2001)
- The Lake of Darkness (2004)

=== Abbey series ===
- The Buried Cross (2004)
- The Silent Man (2004)
- The Scarlet Spring (2004)
- The Drowned Sword (2006)

=== Saga of the Six Worlds series ===
- The Book and the Phoenix (1989) a.k.a. A Rush of Golden Wings and revised as Cradoc's Quest (1994)
- Hostage of the Sea (1990) a.k.a. Rite of Brotherhood
- The Carpenter's Apprentice (1992)
- Storm Wind (1994)

=== Warriors series ===
- Forest of Secrets (2003)
- A Dangerous Path (2004)
- The Darkest Hour (2004)
- Midnight (2005)
- Moonrise (2005)
- Starlight (2006)
- Twilight (2006)
- Sunset (2007)
- Outcast (2008)
- Long Shadows (2008)
- Sunrise (2009)
- The Fourth Apprentice (2009)
- Sign of the Moon (2011)
- The Forgotten Warrior (2011)
- The Sun Trail (2013)
- Thunder Rising (2013)
- The Blazing Star (2014)
- The Apprentice's Quest (2016)
- Shattered Sky (2017)
- River of Fire (2018)
- Lost Stars (2019)
- Veil of Shadows (2020)
- The Place of No Stars (2021)
- River (2022)
- Shadow (2023)
- Wind (2024)
- The Elder's Quest (2025)
- Chasing Shadows (2026)
- Firestar's Quest (2007)
- SkyClan's Destiny (2010)
- Yellowfang's Secret (2012)
- Bramblestar's Storm (2014)
- Hawkwing's Journey (2016)
- Crowfeather's Trial (2018)
- Graystripe's Vow (2020)
- Onestar's Confession (2022)
- Ivypool's Heart (2024)
- Pebbleshine's Kits (2020)
- Daisy's Kin (2021)
- Beyond the Code: Brightspirit's Mercy (2009)

=== Seekers series ===
- Great Bear Lake (2009)
- The Last Wilderness (2010)
- Spirits in the Stars (2011)
- Island of Shadows (2012)
- River of Lost Bears (2013)
- Forest of Wolves (2014)
- The Burning Horizon (2015)
- The Longest Day (2016)

=== Novels ===
- Drew's Talents (1997)
- Mutiny in Space (1997)
- Exiled from Camelot (2000)
- The Reliquary Ring (2002)
- The Roses of Roazon (2004)

== Plays ==
- Where Late the Sweet Birds Sang (1989)
- Achilles His Armour (1991)
