= James L. Barry =

American comics artist

James L. Barry is an American comic artist best known for his work on the Warriors manga series through Tokyopop. He has also done online comics, such as The Lost Horn, Lost Marbles, The Last Prophet, Punzel, Your Fun-Packed Rapture Guide, and Rabid Rabbit. He has also exhibited art in New York's Museum of Comic and Cartooning Art.

== Early life ==
Barry earned his MLA from the School of Visual Arts in Manhattan.

== Career ==
Barry's clients include Tokyopop, HarperCollins, Young and Rubicam and Real Media Solutions.

Barry has done work for many Warriors manga, including the Graystripe's Adventure trilogy (made up of The Lost Warrior, Warrior's Refuge and Warrior's Return), the Ravenpaw's Path trilogy (made up of Shattered Peace, A Clan in Need, and The Heart of a Warrior), the SkyClan and the Stranger trilogy (made up of The Rescue, Beyond the Code, and After the Flood), A Shadow in RiverClan, and Winds of Change. He also illustrated short manga segments at the end of all but one of the Warriors Super Editions, including Bluestar's Prophecy, SkyClan's Destiny, Crookedstar's Promise, Yellowfang's Secret, Tallstar's Revenge, Bramblestar's Storm, Moth Flight's Vision, Hawkwing's Journey, Tigerheart's Shadow, Crowfeather's Trial, Squirrelflight's Hope and Graystripe's Vow. He additionally made illustrations for the adventure games in the back of the Warriors: Omen of the Stars novels.

He has also written many independent comics, including:

- The Lost Horn, an online comic set in a fantasy world about a unicorn whose horn is taken by an evil king for his daughter to play with. It has yet to be completed.
- Lost Marbles, an online comic about a paraplegic who dreams of scaling heights and jumping through a city while the song "Plastic Jesus" plays on the radio.
- The Last Prophet, an online comic about a youth who sees the rapture in church after envisioning that a winged squirrel throws a flaming acorn at his eyes. The same winged squirrel comes to him later and tells him that he must accept his fate by proclaiming the will of the New Trinity. The teenager announces his sighting, but nobody believes him until the rapture happens three days later. However, the adolescent does not get raptured. He instead sees a sign that the behemoth is coming, and the teenager knows that he has been selected to be the last prophet.
- Punzel, an online comic and a modern Rapunzel story. As a prince climbs up Punzel's hair, her cruel father cuts off her hair. When the man falls, Punzel follows him, and they land safely in her cut-off hair.
- Your Fun-Packed Rapture Guide, an online satire comic. It directs statements towards the United States.
- Rabid Rabbit, a series of comic anthologies that has had three contributions from James L. Barry: "Throwin' Out the Trash" from Rabid Rabbit's Trash, "A New York City Haircut" from Rabid Rabbit's Alphabet City, and "The Theory of Dinosaurs in the Garden of Eden" from Rabid Rabit's Holistic Alternative to the Theory of Evolution.
