= Moonrise (novel) =

2005 novel by Erin Hunter

- First edition cover
- Author: Erin Hunter
- Cover artist: Wayne McLoughlin
- Language: English
- Series: Warriors: The New Prophecy
- Genre: Children's literature Fantasy novel
- Publisher: HarperCollins
- Publication date: 21 July 2005 (Canada); 2 August 2005 (United States and United Kingdom)
- Publication place: Canada; United States; United Kingdom
- Media type: Print (hardback & paperback)/On-line (E-book)
- Pages: 304 (first edition)
- ISBN: 978-0-06-074452-6
- LC Class: PZ7.H916625Mo 2005
- Preceded by: Midnight
- Followed by: Dawn

Moonrise is a children's fantasy novel, the second book in the Warriors: The New Prophecy series. The book, which illustrates the adventures of four groups of wild cats (called Clans), was written by Erin Hunter (a pseudonym used by Victoria Holmes, Cherith Baldry, Kate Cary, and Tui T. Sutherland), with cover art by Wayne McLoughlin. Moonrise follows six cats, Brambleclaw, Squirrelpaw, Crowpaw, Feathertail, Stormfur, and Tawnypelt, as they return to their forest home from a journey to the ocean. They travel through the mountains, where they meet the Tribe of Rushing Water, a new group of cats first introduced in this novel. The Tribe cats are being attacked by a savage mountain lion called Sharptooth. The Clan cats eventually agree to help the Tribe get rid of Sharptooth. Series editor Victoria Holmes drew inspiration from locations such as the New Forest and the Scottish Highlands.

Moonrise has been released in hardcover, paperback, and e-book formats, and has been translated into French, Russian, Chinese, Japanese, German and Polish. The book received mostly positive comments from reviews published in Booklist and Horn Book Review, which praised the plot and cliffhanger ending. However, a reviewer for Kirkus Reviews criticized the characters' confusing names and the writing style. Moonrise held the number two spot on The New York Times Best Seller list for children's chapter books for two weeks.

== Development ==
=== Inspirations, influences, and style ===
The authors of the series drew inspiration from several natural locations in the United Kingdom. The four Clans (WindClan, RiverClan, ThunderClan, and ShadowClan) share a fictional forest based on England's New Forest. Loch Lomond is another location that influenced the setting of Moonrise. Some other sources of inspiration for the series include the works of authors such as J. R. R. Tolkien and C. S. Lewis.

Cherith Baldry, one of the people who write using the pen name Erin Hunter, said that it was hard to write the death of Feathertail at the end of Moonrise because they had to present it in a way suitable for the book's younger target audience.

Moonrise is written in an alternating third-person limited narrative, with the exception of the prologue, which is written in a third-person objective perspective. The point-of-view alternates between the characters Stormfur, who is with the questing cats, and Leafpaw, describing her experiences as the destruction of the forest begins.

=== Publication history ===
Moonrise was written by Erin Hunter, a pseudonym used by authors Cherith Baldry, Kate Cary, Tui T. Sutherland, and series editor Victoria Holmes. The pseudonym is used so that the individual novels in the series would not be shelved in different places in libraries. Holmes chose the name Erin because she liked it, and Hunter because it matched the theme of feral cats. It also ensured that the books were shelved near those of Brian Jacques, an author that the writers, collectively known as "the Erins", liked.

Moonrise was published as a hardcover by HarperCollins on 25 July 2005, in Canada, and 2 August 2005, in the US and UK. The book was released as a paperback on 25 July 2006, and as an e-book on 6 November 2007. Moonrise has been translated into various foreign languages: it was released in Russian on 18 October 2005, by OLMA Media Group, in Japanese on 18 March 2009, by Komine Shoten, and in French on 5 March 2009, by Pocket Jeunesse. The Chinese version of Moonrise was published on 30 April 2009, by Morning Star Group. It was packaged with a 3-D trading card depicting Feathertail, with some biographical information on the reverse side. The German translation was published on 19 February 2011, by Verlagsgruppe Beltz.

== Synopsis ==
=== Setting and characters ===
Moonrise takes place in several locations inspired by similar locales in the United Kingdom. With the exception of a disused mine, the forest in which the cats live is based largely on the New Forest. In addition, parts of the story take place by the ocean and in a fictitious mountain range.

The main characters each come from one of four Clans: ThunderClan, RiverClan, ShadowClan, and WindClan. These main characters are known as Brambleclaw, Squirrelpaw, Tawnypelt, Crowpaw, Stormfur and Feathertail. All Clan cats share a belief in StarClan, a group of spirits usually represented by the stars, who are their ancestors and provide them with guidance. The Clans also follow identical hierarchy structures: Clans each have one leader, a deputy who is second-in-command, and a medicine cat who heals their Clanmates in addition to communicating with StarClan. The bulk of each Clan consists of warriors, who carry out hunting for food, patrol borders, and fight battles when they occur. Apprentices are younger cats who are in training to become warriors, or more rarely, medicine cats.

=== Plot ===
In the previous book in the series, Midnight, StarClan, the warrior cats' ancestors, sent four cats (one from each Clan—Brambleclaw, Crowpaw, Feathertail, and Tawnypelt) on a quest. Squirrelpaw and Stormfur went with them. At the end of their journey, they arrived at the ocean and found an unusually intelligent badger named Midnight. Midnight told the cats that the Clans would have to leave their forest home and find a new place to live, as humans were going to cut down the forest and build a new "Thunderpath" (the cats' word for a road).

On the return journey, the Clan cats decide, after consultation with Midnight, to go through a mountain range which they had avoided in their initial travels. There, they meet a Clan-like group of cats called the Tribe of Rushing Water, who have their own set of ancestors: the Tribe of Endless Hunting. The Tribe takes the traveling cats in and gives them food and shelter. The Clan cats discover that the Tribe cats have a prophecy: a silver cat will save them from Sharptooth, a mountain lion that has been killing many members of the Tribe. The Tribe thinks that Stormfur is the silver cat from the prophecy, and he is therefore expected to protect the Tribe from Sharptooth. Stormfur eventually agrees to help the Tribe.

Together, the Clan cats succeed in leading Sharptooth into a trap in a cave. However, their plan to poison Sharptooth goes awry, as he swats the rabbit they used to bait him aside and goes after Crowpaw instead. Brambleclaw knows that they can't end their journey if the cat from WindClan is killed. Feathertail stares at the situation before turning to Stormfur, telling him this was for her to do not him. Without hesitation, she jumps up to the roof of the cave onto a stalactite, causing it to fall. Both Feathertail and Sharptooth are killed by the impact. Crowpaw and Stormfur are distraught and upset at the loss of their friend and Clanmate. The Tribe then realizes that Feathertail was the silver cat in their prophecy, not her brother Stormfur, as they had previously thought. The five remaining cats then continue their journey. The book ends with Squirrelpaw noticing Highstones, which is at the edge of WindClan territory; they are almost home.

Meanwhile, back in the forest, the Clans begin to experience the effects of the humans' intrusion into their territories, including lost and poisoned prey, destruction of the forest and cats being abducted.

Moonrise is followed by Dawn, which details the events following the questing cats' return to the forest, and their subsequent journey to find a new home.

== Critical reception and sales ==
Moonrise received mostly positive reviews from critics. Sally Estes, writing for Booklist, praised Moonrise for its "cliffhanger" ending "that will leave readers eager for the next installment", as well as the suspenseful possibility of the destruction of the forest. A reviewer for Horn Book Review gave a positive review, praising the plot, characters, and writing. The reviewer stated that "Hunter successfully weaves character, plot, and good writing into another readable story". Hilary Williamson, writing for BookLoons, gave Moonrise a positive review, calling it "exciting" and a "gripping epic". A reviewer for Kirkus Reviews criticized the novel for mundane writing, easy-to-confuse names, and the use of the words "meowed" and "mewed" instead of "said". The reviewer thought that the plot was "marred by the same preciousness of its predecessor", but praised the plot for its "enhanced complexity" and suspenseful writing, saying that "a small plot twist is refreshing and suspense builds steadily towards the final installment". The novel has also been mentioned for containing "magic, fantasy, and heroic adventure", and was recommended to fans of Harry Potter as possible reading material after that series' end. Moonrise reached The New York Times Best Seller list for children's chapter books, holding the number two spot for two weeks. It was also ranked 121st on USA Today's bestseller list during the week of 11 August 2005. The work was also a success in Canada, reaching number seven on the Leader-Post children's bestseller list, and remaining in the top 15 for seven weeks. In a Fairfield, Greater Victoria store, Moonrise was reportedly more popular than Harry Potter.
