= So This Is How It Ends =

2006 novel by Tui T. Sutherland

- Author: Tui T. Sutherland
- Cover artist: Christopher Stengel
- Language: English
- Series: Avatars (Book 1)
- Genre: Post apocalyptic fantasy
- Publisher: Eos
- Publication date: October 10, 2006 (hardcover); October 16, 2007 (paperback)
- Publication place: United States
- Media type: Print (hardcover, paperback)
- Pages: 353 (hardcover); 512 (paperback)
- ISBN: 0-06-075024-3
- OCLC: 70775553
- Followed by: Shadow Falling

So This Is How It Ends is a 2006 post apocalyptic fantasy novel by Tui T. Sutherland. It is the first book in the Avatars trilogy. It was published by Eos, an imprint of HarperCollins. It is followed by Shadow Falling.

== Plot summary ==
The book begins by introducing a New York City policeman named Bill Nichols. He is investigating a mysterious house fire from which a little girl by the name of Kali survived. Out of the havoc that was reaped, it seems highly suspicious that a little girl survived. He believes it is luck and dismisses any suspicion, leaving Kali's fate unknown. The setting shifts to Chile, where a boy by the birth name of Catequil and the nickname of Tigre sits in class. The clouds roll in as he sits there, bored. The clouds take control and the boy jumps from class to run outside and enjoy the storm. He loses consciousness and faints. Meanwhile, an Egyptian tomb is broken into by someone who is obviously a child. There, an ancient artifact said to be god-like, is stolen by a boy named Amon. He escapes, knowing this artifact will help him.

Finally, the story shifts to Gus. Gus is arriving home from a night out with his girlfriend Lisa and another couple. As his three friends drop him off, the conversation shifts to a very famous pop singer by the name of Venus. The other couple discuss her concerts and how the teenage pop star seems to enchant all of her fans. After Gus tells them he has never heard her music, they lend him a copy of Venus's album. Gus leaves the car, waves goodbye to his friends and walks into his house. He goes to play the CD when the door rings, and his brother's girlfriend comes in. She announces that Gus's parents and his brother, Andrew, have been in a horrible car wreck. Meanwhile, what is regarded as Venus's most disliked song by music critics (discussing the end of the world) plays.

The story forwards to December 21, 2012. All of the characters previously mentioned are around the age of 16. Bill Nichols, the firefighter who rescued Kali, was married to Kali's mother and had three girls with her. He died, leaving Kali to support her mother and three younger sisters. Kali is trying to balance a job she hates but needs, along with fulfilling her school requirements. As a result, she is portrayed as a very angry teenager. Tigre has grown up with a very controlling, rude girlfriend named Vicky. She is cheating on him and says he is too weak, crushing Tigre's confidence. Subsequently, he runs away, simultaneously conjuring up a storm. Amon, who is still in Egypt, is somehow aware of the day's significance.

The story then moves to Gus, who is now living in Los Angeles with his older brother Andrew. Andrew had survived the wreck, but his parents had died. Still coping with the death of their parents, the brothers live together, and Andrew is working in a theatre business. On December 21, Andrew prepares the set for the now 16-year-old seductive pop sensation, Venus, of whom Gus is now a fan. After realizing how much work was needed to set up for Venus's arrival, Andrew requests Gus's helping, telling him to stay clear of the pop star, as she is a bit of a "diva". As they arrive at the theater, Gus and Andrew are separated due to their jobs . Gus finishes his work and leaves the room when he hears a crash. Returning to the room, he finds an extremely attractive, tom-boyish girl who looked less perfect to Venus, who he assumed to be some sort of relative. However, she was in fact Venus, and when Gus returns the two begin to bond. Venus is genuinely happy that she is able to spend time with someone who is not obsessed with worshipping her, and Gus is very happy now that he was with a girl - since Lisa had dumped him. However, when the girl's true identity - Venus - is revealed, Gus reacts in the way expected - reverence. Venus's bodyguard escorts her away, and Andrew scolded Gus for "bothering" Venus. Later, a faulty prop nearly kills her and, thanks to Gus, she is saved. An earthquake began and the two teenagers fled from the theater building, hoping that everyone else made it out alive. The two teens ran into the night feeling the shift.

Kali feels the quake, and experiences the shift. Tigre slept when the shift hit him. Amon was ready and awake. When the shift completed, Amon stood up, ready for what was to come.
