= Great Bear Lake (novel) =

2009 novel by Erin Hunter

- The cover of Great Bear Lake
- Author: Erin Hunter (Cherith Baldry)
- Cover artist: Wayne McLoughlin
- Language: English
- Series: Seekers
- Genre: Fantasy novel
- Publisher: HarperCollins
- Publication date: 10 February 2009
- Publication place: United Kingdom, United States
- Pages: 320
- ISBN: 0060871253
- Preceded by: The Quest Begins
- Followed by: Smoke Mountain

Great Bear Lake is the second novel in the Seekers series written by Erin Hunter, which is a pseudonym used by authors Cherith Baldry, Kate Cary, Tui Sutherland and editor Victoria Holmes. This specific novel was written by Cherith Baldry. The novel follows the adventures of three bears, Toklo, Kallik, and Lusa. Each bear finds the other by coincidence and form a bond. The declining environment and racism among the bears are two of the themes present in the novel. The novel was released in the US on 10 February 2009 and has also been released in the UK, Canada and translated into Russian. Critical reception was positive with reviewers praising the realistic behavior of the bears and the honest approach to various themes.

== Synopsis ==
Great Bear Lake continues the story of Kallik, Lusa, Toklo, and Ujurak as the bear cubs try to find their way to the Arctic. It starts with Lusa meeting Toklo and Ujurak. She tries to deliver Oka's message to Toklo, but he doesn't want to hear what his mother said. Lusa earns a little respect from Toklo when she saves his life, but he still doesn't want to talk about Oka. Ujurak, due to his kinder personality, befriends Lusa and welcomes her on his mission. Kallik is traveling alone, trying to find her brother Taqqiq. She eventually makes it to the Great Bear Lake. Lusa, Toklo and Ujurak go to the Great Bear Lake too, and Lusa befriends a black bear cub named Miki. However, he is later kidnapped by selfish and bullying white bears, which includes Taqqiq. Kallik tries to convince him to stop, but he ignores her. She ends up in the lake and nearly drowns. Lusa, who is looking for Miki, luckily hears her cries and carries her to safety. Grateful that Lusa saved her life, Kallik teams up with the black bear cub, along with Toklo and Ujurak to save Miki, and stop the white bears from causing more damage. They succeed and Taqqiq leaves his friends to travel with the four bears.

== Publication history ==
Great Bear Lake was first published in the United States as a hardcover and audiobook on 10 February 2009. The book was also released as a paperback on 5 January 2010 and as an e-book on 6 October 2009.

The books have also been released in the United Kingdom and Canada. Canada received the second book on 1 January 2010. It was released in the United Kingdom on 28 June 2012. The first three books have also been translated into Russian.

== Themes ==
Children's Literature comments that the book deals with familiar themes to the Warriors series such as youth versus age, new versus tradition, and the discovery that others are not very different from oneself. KidsReads states that the theme of racism is honestly dealt throughout the book along with the fact that a strong message about the environment is sent. A reviewer from Voice of Youth Advocates finds that themes like adolescent rebellion, habitat destruction and global climate change are found in the book.

== Critical reception ==
Great Bear Lake reached number 68 on Publishers Weekly's Children's Fiction Bestsellers during the week of 22 March 2010, having sold 150,000 copies.

Booklist comments that the story is told with a balance between anthropomorphic characterization, realistic behavior and the brutalities of life in the wild. Children's Literature notes the similarity of themes to the Warriors series and that fans will appreciate new clans and traditions. The reviewer comments that it is not as action packed as the Warriors series, as suggested by the title. Chris Shanley-Delliman from Kidsreads praises the book for it vivid descriptions. He states that Hunter takes on the theme of racism through an "honest approach" - three bears of different color and background meeting together. The reviewer also states that the book deals with an environment theme. The Horn Book Magazine states in a review for Great Bear Lake and Smoke Mountain that the latter may leave readers wondering where the series is heading to while noting that fans will enjoy the mix of fantasy adventure and realistic animal behavior in both books. Voice of Youth Advocates notes that the book is not "great literature" but nevertheless is a good story. The reviewer notes that the bears are "appealingly bearlike" despite being anthropomorphized and having human issues like conflicts with friends and adolescence. The reviewer also mentions the theme of habitat destruction and global climate change. Readers are advised to read the series in order as the volume does not provide a summary of the first novel.
