= The Lost Warrior =

The Lost Warrior may refer to:

- The Lost Warrior (comics), an original English-language manga trilogy based on the best-selling book series Warriors by Erin Hunter
- "The Lost Warrior", a season 1 episode of the 1978 Battlestar Galactica series
