= Bluestar's Prophecy =

2009 novel by Erin Hunter

- First edition cover featuring Bluestar.
- Author: Erin Hunter
- Cover artist: Wayne McLoughlin
- Language: English
- Series: Warriors
- Genre: Children's literature Fantasy novel
- Publisher: HarperCollins
- Publication date: 28 July 2009
- Publication place: United States
- Media type: Print (hardback)
- Pages: 516
- ISBN: 978-0-06-158247-9
- OCLC: 310398979
- LC Class: PZ7.H916625 Blu 2009
- Followed by: Into the Wild

Bluestar's Prophecy is a children's fantasy novel in the Warriors series by Erin Hunter. This is the second Warriors Super Edition, the first being Firestar's Quest. The book follows Bluestar from birth until her eventual rise to leadership in ThunderClan. It was published by HarperCollins and released on 28 July 2009. It was released in China on 31 July 2010.

== Plot ==
Bluestar's Prophecy follows the life of Bluestar, the future leader of ThunderClan. The book opens with a prologue that recounts the Bluestar's death in Warriors: A Dangerous Path from Bluestar's point of view. The book then goes back to Bluestar's kithood, during which Goosefeather, the Clan's medicine cat, receives a prophecy about Bluepaw being a fire that blazes through the forest, but who will be destroyed by water. A few moons later, Bluepaw's mother, Moonflower, is killed by the WindClan's medicine cat, Hawkheart.

Bluepaw's childhood is defined by her relationship with her sister, Snowpaw, which is damaged when Snowpaw – later Snowfur – falls in love with Thistleclaw, whom Bluefur finds arrogant and untrustworthy. Snowfur is later killed when she is hit by a speeding car, leaving a heartbroken Bluefur to care for her son, Whitekit.

As a warrior, Bluefur meets a charismatic RiverClan warrior named Oakheart; although their first interaction is prickly, they eventually fall in love. They decide to spend one night together at Fourtrees, the regular Clan Gathering place, but agree that for the good of their Clans, they will never meet again. One moon later, Bluefur is horrified to find out that she is expecting kits. Thrushpelt, a ThunderClan warrior with feelings for Bluefur, offers to help her take care of her kits. Bluefur accepts his offer, allowing the rest of ThunderClan to believe that Thrushpelt is the father of her kits.

Sunstar, ThunderClan's leader, tells Bluefur that he was planning to make her ThunderClan's new deputy, but because of her kits, he will promote Thistleclaw to deputy instead. After having a vision of Thistleclaw drenched in blood, Bluefur realizes that allowing him to become deputy and then leader would be deadly to the Clan. She decides to take her three kits to Oakheart and let them be raised in RiverClan. During this, one of her kits, Mosskit, freezes to death while her other kits, Mistykit and Stonekit, make it to Riverclan. She explains the disappearance of her kits by pretending they have been taken by a starving fox.

Without her kits, Bluefur is made deputy. After Sunstar loses his final life to dogs, she becomes leader, receiving her own nine lives and taking on the name Bluestar. After successfully leading ThunderClan for several seasons, she receives another prophecy from the ThunderClan medicine cat, Spottedleaf: "Fire alone can save our Clan." Later, while on patrol with Whitestorm and her deputy, Redtail, she catches sight of a bright ginger house cat named Rusty. Recognizing him as the cat from Spottedleaf's prophecy, she names him Firepaw and accepts him into ThunderClan.

== Critical reception ==
"In the midst of ThunderClan, a kit is born. According to a prophecy, blue-gray she-cat Bluekit will possess a fire-like power that win her a dominant place in her Clan's ranks, but even that gift can not protect her from one swift foe. The second Warriors Super Edition novel will enthrall you with its feline strength and mythological aura." — Barnes and Noble Editorial Review

== Publication history ==
- Bluestar's Prophecy (EN), HarperCollins (hardcover), 28 July 2009
- Bluestar's Prophecy (EN), HarperCollins (e-book), 28 July 2009
- Bluestar's Prophecy (EN), HarperCollins (paperback), 1 June 2010
- 藍星的預言 (CN), Morning Star (unknown binding), 31 July 2010, translated by Gao Mei
- Пророчество Синей Звезды, volume 1, Начало (RU), OLMA Media Group (hardcover), 2010, translated by Veronica Maximova
- Пророчество Синей Звезды, volume 2, Выбор (RU), OLMA Media Group (hardcover), 2010, translated by Veronica Maximova
- Blausterns Prophezeiung (DE), Verlagsgruppe Beltz (hardcover), 2013, translated by Klaus Weimann
- La prophétie d'Etoile Bleue (FR), Pocket Jeunesse (paperback), 4 July 2013, translated by Aude Carlier
- Sinitähden tarina (FI), Art House (hardcover) 12 December 2014, translated by Nana Sironen
- 蓝星的预言 (ZH), Future Press (paperback), 1 February 2017
- Blauwsters voorspelling (NL), Baeckens Books (hardcover), 16 October 2017, translated by Pauline Akkerhuis
- Bluestar's Prophecy (EN), HarperCollins (paperback; reprint), 2 July 2019
- Bluestar's Prophecy (EN), HarperCollins (audiobook), 2 July 2019
