= Avatars (series) =

Post apocalyptic fantasy trilogy by Tui T. Sutherland

- So This Is How It Ends (2006); Shadow Falling (2007); Kingdom of Twilight (2008)
- Author: Tui T. Sutherland
- Country: United States
- Language: English
- Genre: Post Apocalyptic Fantasy
- Publisher: Eos
- Published: October 10, 2006 – October 2008
- Media type: Print (hardback & paperback)

Avatars is a trilogy of post apocalyptic fantasy novels written by Tui T. Sutherland. The trilogy contains three books, namely So This Is How It Ends, Shadow Falling, and Kingdom of Twilight.The story follows a group of teens who get transported into the future where they learn that they are avatars of different pantheons who must fight to find out who will become the ultimate ruler of the gods and humans.

== Novels ==
=== So This Is How It Ends ===
So This Is How It Ends is the first book in the Avatars Trilogy. It was released on October 10, 2006. Kali, Tigre, Gus, Diana, and Amon are five seemingly normal teenagers. On December 21, 2012, they are transferred to the future, where they hear voices in their heads telling them to go in a certain direction. They encounter many problems on their way to the "Gathering place" where they learn that they are avatars from different gods and that they must fight each other to find out who will become the ruler of all gods and humans.

=== Shadow Falling ===
Shadow Falling is the second book in the series and was released on October 16, 2007. The story continues where the first book left off. The avatars must decide whether to fight each other or to find a way back to their own time. They also must defend themselves from other avatars who want to fight. Two new avatars are introduced.

=== Kingdom of Twilight ===
Kingdom of Twilight is the third book and was released on November 11, 2008. Gus, Kali, and Tigre take Diana's body to Africa in the hopes of saving her without interference from the gods. In Africa, they get help from two African gods, Obatala and Orunmila, who tell Gus how to go to the underworlds to save Diana. They also meet Oya, African goddess of the hunt, wind, hurricanes, and change, who helps Tigre develop his powers. The plot also follows Diana's travels in the underworlds of different pantheons.

== Reception ==
All three books received mostly positive reviews. On the first book, KLIATT in its starred review calls Sutherland "Sutherland is an innovative and eloquent writer, creating complex characters and handling a complicated plot told from different perspectives with ease". School Library Journal said that "Readers will be drawn to the well-written characters and intrigued by the unexpected, cliff-hanger ending". Booklist praised the book saying, "[Sutherland] builds a frightening vision shot through with well-placed and genuine humor". The book was selected by the New York Public Library for their Books for the Teen Age List 2007.

The second book also had positive reviews. KLIATT calls it "a strong middle book that neatly and convincingly bridges the action" adding that "Readers will snap it up if they've read the first one". Kirkus said that "Gamers with a literary bent may be drawn in".

Reviewing the third book, KLIATT said in its starred review that, "The ending is a bit surprising and wholly satisfactory" and that "it has a serious and thoughtful edge". VOYA remarked that "Readers will reward the saga's ending with a satisfying round of applause".

== Characters ==
=== Avatars ===
- Kali – Avatar from Hindu pantheon. Avatar of Indian goddess of creation and destruction, Kali. She is a half-Indian teen living in New York.
- Diana/Venus – Avatar from Greco-Roman pantheon. Avatar of goddess of the moon and the hunt, Diana, and the goddess of love, Venus. She is a pop star living in Los Angeles. Diana has red-golden hair, green eyes, and freckles.
- Tigre – Avatar from Mesoamerican pantheon. Avatar of Incan storm god, Catequil. He works as an assistant to a veterinarian in Santiago, Chile.
- Gus – Avatar from Polynesian pantheon. Avatar of god of war, 'Oro. He is a normal teen who became an avatar when he touched Venus just before extrication. He has straight brown hair, and, like Venus, has green eyes.
- Amon – Avatar from Egyptian pantheon. Avatar of sun god, Amon.
- Thor – Avatar from Norse pantheon. Avatar of god of thunder and lightning, Thor.
- Anna – Avatar from Sumerian pantheon. Avatar of goddess of love and war, Inanna.

=== Other major characters ===
- Miracle – A thirteen-year-old child in New York City. The only child who was born after the humans became infertile. She is believed by herself and others to be the savior of the humans, but the gods say that she was just born to give the humans false hope.
- Zeus – Greek God of the Thunder and lightning.
- Oya – An orisha. The Yoruba goddess of the hunt, hurricanes, change and other things. She helps Tigre develop his powers.
- Quetzie – A neoquetzal, an evolved, larger version of a quetzal. She helps Tigre get to New York and also helps the avatars communicate with Thor.
- Shiva – Kali's trainer and husband. Hindu god of destruction.
- Apollo – Diana's trainer and brother. Greek god of the music, medicine, the sun, etc.
- Odin – Thor's trainer. He has a vision which gives him the idea for the contest.
- Isis – Amon's trainer and Egyptian goddess of motherhood, magic and fertility.
- Ereshkigal – Anna's trainer and twin sister. Sumerian goddess of the underworld. She tries to trick the other avatars by telling them that she is an avatar.
- Trickster – Also referred to in the series as Loki, Eshu, Maui, Coyote. He tries to take revenge on the rest of the gods by manipulating the avatars so that he will get the powers of all the avatars.

== See also ==
- So This Is How It Ends
