= Wings of Fire (novel series) =

- The Wings of Fire text-based logo as used on the covers of the novels
- Arc 1 – The Dragonet Prophecy: The Dragonet Prophecy (2012) (GN: 2018); The Lost Heir (2013) (GN: 2019); The Hidden Kingdom (2013) (GN: 2019); The Dark Secret (2013) (GN: 2020); The Brightest Night (2014) (GN: 2021); Arc 2 – The Jade Mountain Prophecy: Moon Rising (2014) (GN: 2022); Winter Turning (2015) (GN: 2023); Escaping Peril (2015) (GN: 2024); Talons of Power (2016) (GN: 2025); Darkness of Dragons (2017) (GN: 2026); Arc 3 – The Lost Continent Prophecy: The Lost Continent (2018); The Hive Queen (2018); The Poison Jungle (2019); The Dangerous Gift (2021); The Flames of Hope (2022); Arc 4 – The Forgotten Isles Prophecy: The Hybrid Prince (2026); Legends: Darkstalker (2016) (GN: 2025); Dragonslayer (2020); Winglets: Prisoners (2015); Assassin (2015); Deserter (2016); Runaway (2016); Hero (2026); Other: Forge Your Dragon World (2022); The Official Coloring Book (2022); A Guide to the Dragon World (2023); The Official How to Draw (2023); The Official Stained Glass Art Book (2024); The Official Stickerpedia (2026); The Official Glow-in-the-Dark Coloring Book (2026)
- Author: Tui T. Sutherland
- Illustrator: Joy Ang (novel covers and guides for novels); Mike Holmes (Graphic Novels); Mike Schley (maps and borders); Brianna C. Walsh (companion titles); Jake Parker (only Legends, Darkstalker graphic novel arts)
- Cover artist: Joy Ang
- Country: United States
- Language: English, Japanese, German, French, Chinese, along with 6 others.
- Genre: Fantasy, Middle grade literature, fiction
- Publisher: Scholastic
- Published: July 1, 2012 – present
- Media type: Print (hardcover & paperback), Audiobook, E-book
- No. of books: 24
- Website: kids.scholastic.com/kids/books/wings-of-fire/

Wings of Fire is a juvenile adventure fantasy novel series about dragons, written by Tui T. Sutherland and published by Scholastic Inc. The series has sold over 39 million copies worldwide and has been translated into 16 languages. The series reached #1 on the New York Times Best Seller list and has remained there for over 300 weeks, making it one of the most successful fantasy series for young readers. Wings of Fire is rated for ages 7–12 according to Scholastic, Inc. It has also proven popular with young adults and older audiences.

The series currently consists of three arcs, with a fourth underway. The novels focus on juvenile dragonets; each book centers on its own protagonist, told through a third person limited perspective. Each arc revolves around a new prophecy which must be fulfilled or subverted in order to save the realms of Pyrrhia and Pantala. Sixteen books in the main series have been released thus far, along with five novellas (known as Winglets), two extended-length standalone novels (known as Legends), multiple companion books, and a series of graphic novel adaptations of titles from the main series. The series has been edited by Amanda Maciel and features covers drawn by Joy Ang, with some international cover variants. Many of the titles have been recorded as audiobooks by Shannon McManus.

== Setting and universe ==
Wings of Fire takes place on an unnamed world with two continents, Pyrrhia and Pantala. The planet is inhabited primarily by dragons of various tribes; dragons tend to live in with others of their tribe in their suited habitat; for example, MudWings inhabit the swamps, whereas SkyWings live in the mountains. Hybrids between the various tribes are possible, though generally rare.

Most tribes have unique abilities or adaptations, such as the cold resistance of the tundra-dwelling IceWings. Tribes are ruled by dynasties of queens. Rarely, a dragon will possess a genetic ability known as animus magic, allowing them to enchant objects by speaking or thinking a command.

Both continents are also home to humans (called "scavengers" by dragons in-series), which are often regarded as unimportant animals who cannot think for themselves; human–dragon relationships are explored throughout the books.

== Plot ==
Over 5,000 years prior to the events of the main series, humans were the dominant species of Pyrrhia. Dragons in this period were solitary creatures, with no true civilizations. A human stole a dragon's egg, and other humans followed suit. Eventually, the dragons fought back and set fire to most of the human settlements, driving the remaining humans into hiding.

Two thousand years afterward, a disagreement started over a village harboring fugitives from other tribes. Many dragons were exiled to the Court of Refuge, a prison where they and their descendants would be trapped forever.

Twenty years prior to the events of The Dragonet Prophecy, a human kills the SandWing queen, sparking a war of succession. According to a prophecy, a group of young dragons bring an end to the war. These characters, throughout the events of arc one, travel across the continent of Pyrrhia, eventually bringing an end to the war by choosing a SandWing to be queen.

The second arc takes place shortly after the end of the war, with the previous arc's protagonists starting an intertribal school. A NightWing wielding powers of telepathy and foresight begins receiving telepathic communication from an animus dragon named Darkstalker, who is trapped beneath a mountain. Darkstalker later escapes and performs many enchantments, such as bending a tribe to his will and sending a magical plague to his enemies. He is eventually stopped by being tricked into eating an enchanted strawberry, which turns him into a baby dragon (with no memories of his former identity).

The third arc follows the perspectives of five dragons who are determined to save Pantala from a tyrannical HiveWing queen with mind control powers. They venture to the depths of Pantala and destroy a mind-controlling plant serving as the source of the queen's power.

The fourth arc follows two MudWings as they run away from Jade Mountain Academy and are taken in by the Court of Refuge.

== Supplementary works ==
=== Legends ===
Legends are standalone titles in the Wings of Fire series that provide a new perspective on main series events. Two Legends books have been released to date, Darkstalker and Dragonslayer.

=== Winglets ===
Short stories called Winglets have been published, which are told from the perspectives of secondary characters from the main series and serve to provide additional context regarding events mentioned in the main series. Five Winglets have been released as of 2026.

=== Graphic novel adaptation ===
An ongoing graphic novel adaption of the series, started in 2018, is illustrated by Mike Holmes.

As of November 2026, nine graphic novels have been released.

=== Other titles ===
Several companion books have been released, including a coloring book, and a book containing advice on worldbuilding and character development.

In addition, limited editions of the first five books have been released starting in 2024, each featuring unique cover art as well as bonus materials including character sketches and Q&As with the author. The limited edition for The Dragonet Prophecy also contains an early omitted chapter. A box set containing all five books was released in 2025.

== Reception ==
Wings of Fire has proven to be one of the most popular and enduring novel series for young and young adult readers. The series has received largely positive reviews from critics and audiences.

Booklist praised the books' high stakes and entertainment value, noting that "dramatic battle scenes, double-crosses, and one seriously deranged queen makes Wings of Fire a series that should have broad appeal for middle-grade fantasy fans."

Kirkus Reviews described Wings of Fire's debut novel as "fast paced and detailed... this first installment in a new adventure series is entertaining." They went on to note the series "contains all the key ingredients for a successful formula-fantasy series: hierarchical social structure, destiny, attributive names and a map." In their review of the graphic novel adaptation, they hailed it as "a stellar adaptation [that] is sure to delight both those familiar and newcomers to this series."

Patrick Hayes of SciFi Pulse called the series "highly enjoyable" and gave it an A rating. In his review of Darkstalker, he praised the novel as "... a magnificent addition to the Wings of Fire series and a complex work that needs no prior reading to enjoy. A fantastic story of how good can become evil."

ScreenRant hailed the series as "the ultimate series for dragon lovers."

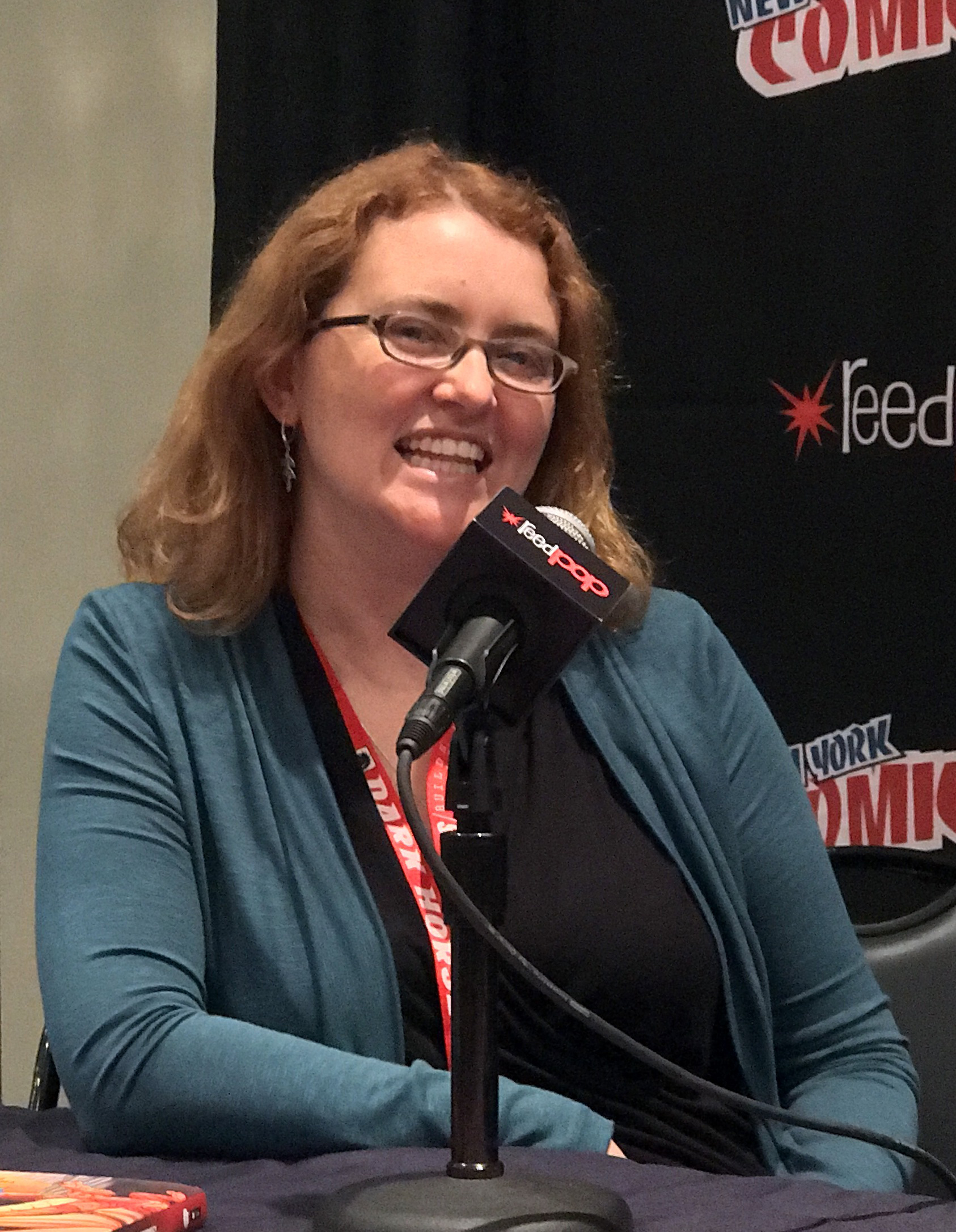
The author of the series, Tui T. Sutherland

Writing about the graphic novel adaption, School Library Journal found the "text bubbles occasionally hard to follow," but praised the adaptation for "bring[ing] the dragons and their surroundings to life," noting that the original novel "translates well to the graphic novel format."

=== FanWing Fest ===
Since 2025, a series of fan celebration events known as FanWing Fest have sold out multiple cities across the United States.

== Television series adaptation ==
In March 2020, an animated television series was announced to be in development with ARRAY and Warner Bros. Animation for Netflix, with production commencing in April 2021. Ava DuVernay was to helm the project, which would initially include ten 40-minute episodes. However, in May 2022, Netflix scrapped the series for unspecified reasons.

In February 2024, it was announced that the books were picked up for production by Amazon Prime Video, and the animated series will be produced by Amazon MGM Studios with an entirely different creative team attached to the production. The announcement revealed that Jack Tar Productions, under executive producer Marc Resteghini, was assigned to the adaptation. In May 2025, it was announced that Aaron Waltke will be attached as showrunner, co-writer and executive producer, with Sutherland as co-writer and executive producer.
