= Seekers (novel series) =

Series of juvenile fantasy novels by Erin Hunter

- The cover of The Quest Begins, the first book in the series
- The Quest Begins; Great Bear Lake; Smoke Mountain; The Last Wilderness; Fire in the Sky; Spirits in the Stars; Island Of Shadows; The Melting Sea; River Of Lost Bears; Forest Of Wolves; The Burning Horizon; The Longest Day
- Author: Erin Hunter
- Cover artist: Wayne McLoughlin
- Country: United Kingdom
- Language: English
- Genre: Teen literature, fantasy
- Publisher: HarperCollins
- Published: 27 May 2008 – 6 January 2016
- Media type: Print

Seekers is a novel series written by Tui T. Sutherland and Cherith Baldry under the pseudonym Erin Hunter, who also wrote the Warriors series. Seekers follows the adventures of four bear cubs: Kallik (a polar bear), Lusa (an American black bear), Ujurak (a small grizzly bear who can shape-shift into any animal), and Toklo (also a grizzly bear). Led by Ujurak, the four bears search for a place where they can live in peace without human interference and harassment. The first book of the first series, The Quest Begins, was released on 27 May 2008 and was followed by five other books, ending with the last book of the first series, Spirits in the Stars, which was released on 8 February 2011. A second series of novels subtitled Return to the Wild, also six books in length, began publication with Island of Shadows, released on 7 February 2012. The series has been well received, with critics praising the realistic behavior of the characters, the world building, and the book's themes surrounding environmentalism.

== Inspiration and origins ==
Seekers began as a request from HarperCollins to editor Victoria Holmes to develop another series about a group of animals similar to their highly successful Warriors series, but not about cats. Dogs were initially suggested, but rejected because they were too similar to cats in terms of their social organization and territoriality. Holmes stated that she "was reluctant to create stories that [she] felt would be quite similar to Warriors. Dogs live in packs, they hunt for their food, they have a strict hierarchy within their communities, they guard their territories". Several other animals, including horses, otters, and dolphins were considered, but were dismissed for various reasons; Holmes felt that horses tended to run away rather than stay and fight, which she believed would not make for very interesting interpersonal drama between characters, that dolphins would be too visually similar to tell apart from each other in a large cast of characters, and that otters did not have a broad enough audience appeal. Holmes ultimately decided that the series would be about bears, her reasoning being that bears are much more solitary, undomesticated animals and do not live in close-knit communities like feral cats. She thought that bears were fierce and large enough to make for compelling battle scenes, while still feeling intelligent enough to be anthropomorphized.

Holmes wanted faith to be a central theme in the series, which manifests in the form of the bears having a very close and spiritual connection to the environment. Holmes states that she drew a lot of inspiration for this aspect of the series from the beliefs of various Native American tribes in the area that Seekers takes place and their relationships with the environment and the land they live on. She grew particularly interested in Inuit culture and the societal role of a shaman, someone with the ability to transform into different animals. This inspired the character of Ujurak, a bear with the ability to transform into any animal he wishes, including humans. Holmes said she thought it would be an interesting opportunity to portray the human world as seen through the eyes of an animal.

The names of the characters are taken from various Native American languages; Lusa means midnight or black in Choctaw, Kallik means lightning in Inuktitut, Silaluk means storm in Inuktitut, Taqqiq means moon, Toklo means two in Chicksaw, and Ujurak means rock.

== Books ==
=== First series ===
The series takes place over the span of six books: The Quest Begins, Great Bear Lake, Smoke Mountain, The Last Wilderness, Fire in the Sky, and Spirits in the Stars. The story follows four young bears. Lusa, an American black bear, Kallik, a polar bear, Toklo, a grizzly bear, and Ujurak, a grizzly bear who is able to shapeshift into any animal, but remains a grizzly bear most of the time. The story is set in various locations in Canada.

The first book, The Quest Begins, shows how each of the four bears are abandoned by or otherwise separated from their families. Kallik is separated from her mother Nisa and brother Taqqiq when a pod of orcas eat her mother, while her brother was still on the other side of an ice canal, thinking they were both dead. After this, Kallik begins travelling to find her brother. Toklo is abandoned by his mother Oka after his brother, Tobi, dies. His mother sees how the salmon is disappearing, and leaves Toklo to travel alone. Lusa was born and raised in the "bear bowl" at the Greater Vancouver Zoo. Her story intertwines with Toklo's after his mother is brought to the zoo and Lusa hears of the wild. Hoping to leave her home, she escapes the zoo and searches for Toklo. Meanwhile, Toklo finds Ujurak injured and helps him; they begin to travel together. They meet up with Lusa at the end of the book. By Great Bear Lake, the four bears have joined together and they attempt to reach the Arctic. Although Kallik finds Taqqiq, he has joined a group of bullying polar bears who kidnap a male black bear cub named Miki. Taqqiq sees that what he did was wrong and joins the questing bears, but he leaves the group in the third book, Smoke Mountain, when he feels he does not belong with them. The remaining four cubs learn of a place called the Last Great Wilderness (the Arctic National Wildlife Refuge) in the fourth book, The Last Wilderness, where there is food and shelter for them. After defying hardships such as hunger and the threat of humans, they finally make it to the Last Great Wilderness. However, Ujurak, who leads the journey, feels that they need to go further into the Arctic. In Fire in the Sky, the bears leave the Last Great Wilderness and travel towards the Arctic. In the sixth and final book of the first series, Spirits in the Stars, the four bears make it to Star Island (Ellesmere Island), a place where many polar bears live. They find a sick mother polar bear named Sura and her nameless cub. Sura dies from sickness and the traveling four bears look after her cub, which Kallik names Kissimi. Toklo finds that he also struggles with his urge to become a proper brown bear and travel alone. The bears save the polar bears that inhabit Star Island by destroying an oil rig that was poisoning the seals that they eat, but Ujurak dies in an avalanche while saving the others. Yakone, a determined young male polar bear who lived on the strange Star Island with the sick bears, joins the group of bears at the end of the book.

=== Return to the Wild ===
The series comprises six books: Island of Shadows, The Melting Sea, River of Lost Bears, Forest of Wolves, The Burning Horizon, and The Longest Day.

The story details Toklo, Kallik, Lusa, and Yakone's return home. However, they struggle with leaving the only family they have ever known and returning home to where they have been away from for some time, as well as grappling with the loss of Ujurak. They also meet the strange Nanulak, a young and bitter male grolar bear. While trying to find homes for each of them, their bond is tested when Kallik and Yakone feel the pull of the ice on the Melting Sea, and Toklo of the forest in his birthplace. They also run into Taqqiq, who has rejoined his bullying friends but soon realizes the error of his ways and leaves them for good, and Chogan, Toklo's father, who loses to his son in a territorial dispute but refuses to acknowledge his victory. During the last leg of the journey, Lusa is separated from the others and taken to a wildlife hospital, from which she escapes and reunites with the others with guidance from Ujurak's spirit. In The Longest Day, the four bears arrive at Great Bear Lake and are forced to join their own kind for the Longest Day ceremonies, but the three species are determined to not help or rely on each other until a fire forces them to seek shelter together. At the end of the last book, it is revealed that the Seekers, now three years older, have their own families and cubs.

=== Other books ===
The Seekers series also features several stand-alone books published in original English-language manga form. The books were written by Erin Hunter and illustrated by Bettina M. Kurkoski, who also illustrated The Rise of Scourge, a stand-alone manga from one of Erin Hunter's other series, Warriors. The books were published by the American anime and manga publishing company Tokyopop. Each book is named after one of the main characters and each book's story is from the point of view of its respective titular character, set before the events of The Quest Begins. The first entry, Toklo's Story, was released on 9 February 2010. The second entry, Kallik's Adventure, was released on 8 February 2011. A third manga entry, Lusa's Tale, was announced and was slated to be released in January 2012. However, on 15 April 2011, Tokyopop announced that it would be discontinuing its services in the United States, resulting in the unofficial cancellation of Lusa's Tale and any potential future manga entries for the series.

== Themes ==
The main theme emphasized in the series is the environment and how humans affect it. The authors stated that working on a series centered around an entirely different species and a different setting allowed them to explore themes that would not fit well in the Warriors series, such as environmentalism. Publishers Weekly said that "readers will appreciate the bears' struggle to survive, along with Hunter's environmental theme." Booklist commented on how each story of the three bears touches on environmental issues. School Library Journal noted that "the bears' declining habitat is evident, and often throughout their journey the animals have to dodge cars and humans with guns." The series tackles how industrialization affects wildlife as the main characters go on a physical journey across Canada, but also a spiritual journey about preserving their way of life for future generations and what it really means to be wild.

A review from Children's Literature also commented on themes such as "youth versus age, new versus tradition and the discovery that foreign others are often not very different from oneself." Some reviewers have also noted that references to racism and discrimination can be gleaned from the text. A Kidreads reviewer notes that "[Hunter] also cleverly deals with the theme of racism through a unique and honest approach—three bears of different color, different backgrounds and different beliefs turn to each other for survival and friendship."

== Publication history ==
The first series contains a total of six books. Seekers was originally going to be named "The Clawed Path," as the journey the four bears make through the first series is referred to as "the clawed path." At the last minute, the title was changed so that it would seem similar to the Warriors series. Holmes was initially unhappy with the change, but has since said that she has come to like it and the way it looks on the covers of the books.

The first novel of the series, The Quest Begins, was first featured on the HarperCollin's FirstLook Program in November 2007. Readers who signed up for the program had a chance to read an early edition of the book, an Advanced Reader's Copy, before it was published and released in stores. The Quest Begins was released in the United States on 27 May 2008. The book was also released as a paperback on 10 February 2009 and late as an e-book on 6 October 2009.

The books have also been released in the UK and Canada. Canada received the first book on 25 May 2008. The UK releases have different covers than the Canadian and US covers. In the UK, only the first, second, third and fourth books were released. The first three books have also been translated into Russian.

== Critical reception ==
Seekers has received generally positive reviews. Publishers Weekly praised the suspenseful ending of the first book and thought readers would find great interest in the bears' struggle to survive. Booklist found the plot of the first book to have an "interesting balance of cute anthropomorphic characterization and realistic attention to bear behaviors." School Library Journal wrote "from the first page, this story is exciting and refreshing" and "[t]he plot is fast paced, and the author is apt at creating and sustaining the adrenaline-charged mood of these youngsters on their own." Kirkus Reviews commented that "Hunter creates a richly sensuous world filled with cruelty, beauty, tenderness, savagery and just enough underlying legendary background to add mystery." However, the reviewer also felt that too much detail went into developing the characters and setting, and that little focus was given to the book's plot.
