= JSA: The Liberty Files =

DC Comics series

Publication information
- Publisher: DC Comics
- Publication date: 2000 (JSA: The Liberty File), 2003 (JSA: The Unholy Three), 2012 (JSA: The Liberty Files - The Whistling Skull)
- Main character(s): The Bat (Batman), The Clock (Hourman), The Owl (Doctor Mid-Nite), Superman (Kal-El/Zod), and others

Creative team
- Written by: Dan Jolley; B. Clay Moore (JSA: The Liberty Files - The Whistling Skull)
- Artist: Tony Harris
- Penciller: Tony Harris
- Inker: Ray Snyder

JSA: The Liberty Files is a comic book published by DC Comics. The writers were Dan Jolley and Tony Harris. The artists were Harris and Ray Snyder. The books were originally written as two separate two-issue stories; JSA: The Liberty File in 2000 and a sequel, JSA: The Unholy Three in 2003. They were published as a single volume collection in 2004. In 2012, an additional sequel entitled JSA: The Liberty Files - The Whistling Skull debuted, again with Tony Harris, and featuring B. Clay Moore as the writer.

The series was created as part of DC's Elseworlds line, stories that are considered non-canonical. This series was based on characters from the Justice Society of America but portrayed them as covert government operatives in a World War II-era setting, rather than their traditional portrayal as superheroes fighting criminals.

== The Liberty File ==
=== Part 1: "Brother Can You Spare a Mind?" ===
Set in Egypt, 1942, the Bat (a.k.a. Batman) has been ordered to work with two new partners, the Clock (a.k.a. Hourman) and the Owl (a.k.a. Doctor Mid-Nite), as a group codenamed the Unholy Three. Their mission is to find Jack the Grin (a.k.a. the Joker), a smuggler who has stolen information about an unidentified German secret weapon. They are in a race with the Germans, who are also looking for Jack to recover the plans. They succeed and discover the German weapon is an "Übermensch" (translated: "superman").

=== Part 2: "...And the Clock Struck Midnight" ===
The Owl, injured in the previous mission, is recovering in a hospital when he is killed by an enemy agent. The Bat and the Clock are sent to Switzerland to meet an agent who has information about the German Superman and to rendezvous with Terry Sloane, a former field agent codenamed Mister Terrific. A German agent, the Scarecrow, pursues them and kills the agents' Swiss contact. In a struggle with Scarecrow, Sloane's fiancée is killed. Sloane resumes his Mister Terrific identity and helps the Bat and the Clock pursue and kill the Scarecrow. They find out that the Superman, accompanied by Adolf Hitler and other Nazi leaders, has traveled to Egypt to spearhead a German military offensive.

The Bat arrives in Egypt just as the attack is about to begin. He confronts the "Superman", who is revealed to be the Martian Manhunter. In addition to his other powers, the Manhunter is able to absorb another person's thoughts by touching them. Hitler has made sure that he is the only one the Martian touches, so his worldview is the only one the Martian is aware of. The Bat counteracts this by having the Martian touch him to learn his thoughts and see how Hitler lied. Realizing this, the Martian turns against the Germans and helps the Allies defeat them, just before the Allies deploy their own super soldier, a young man dressed as Superman.

== The Unholy Three ==
=== Part 3 ===
The JSA

In 1948, with the war over, the Bat is now fighting criminals in Gotham City. He had briefly worked with the Clock and Mister Terrific, but Sloane blames him for his fiancée's death and refuses to work with him. The Clock also retired to his civilian identity of Rex Tyler and returned to running his company.

The Bat and the Clock are re-activated as government agents when two former KGB agents, the Parasite and Steelwolf, are working for an unknown employer. They are killing superheroes and seeking a plan called the Trigger. The Bat and the Clock are introduced to Clark Kent (a.k.a. Superman) a new agent who, despite his inexperience, is placed in charge of the group.

The group pursues the Parasite to Berlin, where they find he has killed Steelwolf and absorbed his powers. They fight the Parasite who is killed by Superman in an apparent act of panic. It is revealed that this Superman is not Kal-El, but rather Zod, another Kryptonian who has the same superpowers, but is a psychopath.

=== Part 4 ===
The group meets with another agent, the Sandman, who has information about the Trigger. He has learned it is a device that will cause every nuclear reactor in the world to detonate at once. The Sandman arranges for the group to meet with the Lantern (a.k.a. the Golden Age Green Lantern), who has the information on where the device is located. Zod diverts the Bat and the Clock and learns that the device is in Chernobyl. He cripples Lantern by vaporizing his ring-bearing hand with heat vision. The Sandman narrowly escapes, and reveal the truth about Zod to the Bat and the Clock.

The Bat summons all available covert agents to attack Zod. Mercury (a.k.a. the Flash), the Hawk (a.k.a. Hawkman), the Huntress, the Atom, the Tornado (a.k.a. Red Tornado) and the Star (a.k.a. Starman) respond to the call. The Atom and the Hawk are killed, and the others are barely able to keep Zod contained. The Bat sends Mercury to bring Sloane, who has been working on a formula to duplicate Superman's powers. The Bat takes it and is able to defeat Zod. The Star binds Zod to the device in Chernobyl and sends him to the upper atmosphere. The formula almost kills the Bat, but he survives. He is reconciled with Sloane and they plan on reforming the Unholy Three when he recovers.

== Publication ==
The two mini-series are collected into a single trade paperback:

- JSA: The Liberty Files (264 pages, DC Comics, 2004, ISBN 1-4012-0203-9)

== Critical reaction ==
Collected Editions website reviewer Simon Finger praised JSA: The Liberty Files's Tony Harris for his artwork, which conveys "the subtle emotional beats of the story as effectively as he does the action sequences". He wrote that "[Dan] Jolley and Harris capably integrate the character development into the action" and that the book might appeal even to those not well-versed in the DC Universe characters.

== See also ==
- List of Elseworlds publications
