= Firestar's Quest =

2007 novel by Erin Hunter

- First edition cover
- Author: Erin Hunter
- Cover artist: Wayne McLoughlin
- Language: English
- Series: Warriors
- Genre: Children's literature Fantasy novel
- Publisher: HarperTrophy
- Publication date: 21 August 2007
- Publication place: United States
- Media type: Print (hardback & paperback)
- Pages: 510
- ISBN: 978-0-06-113164-6
- OCLC: 86090263
- LC Class: PZ7.H916625 Firs 2007
- Preceded by: The Darkest Hour
- Followed by: Midnight (Chronologically) and SkyClan's Destiny (Plot-wise)

Firestar's Quest is a volume in the Warriors novel series by Erin Hunter.

Firestar's Quest follows Firestar, the leader of ThunderClan, one of the four Clans of cats living in a forest, as he goes on a journey to find the lost fifth Clan, SkyClan. After receiving dreams from the previous leader of SkyClan, Firestar and his mate, Sandstorm, leave ThunderClan to find and rebuild the lost tribe. At the end of the book, the Clan is rebuilt with a leader, medicine cat and territory. It is set between The Darkest Hour and Midnight.

Firestar's Quest returns to being written from Firestar's point of view as in the original Warriors series, after the subsequent series were written from the perspectives of other characters. The book allowed Erin Hunter to explore the old territories again, having moved to the lake territories in Dawn. An excerpt of Firestar's Quest was released to promote sales of the book, which were very successful. The novel has also received positive critical reception.

== Concept and development ==
The first six books in the Warriors series are written from the perspective of Firestar, while the later Warriors: The New Prophecy and Warriors: Power of Three series are written from the perspectives of other cats. The authors chose to return to Firestar's perspective for the special edition. Cherith Baldry wrote Firestar's Quest and Gary Chalk illustrated the book. Erin Hunter has said the novel was a chance to explore the old territories, which had been left behind in the Warriors: The New Prophecy series.

To promote the book, an excerpt was released online on the Warriors website, and later at the back of the Warriors manga volume Warrior's Refuge.

== Background ==
All Warriors novels are written by Erin Hunter, a pen name for four people: Victoria Holmes, who creates the storylines and edits, and Kate Cary, Cherith Baldry, and Tui Sutherland, who write the books in turns. Chronologically, Firestar's Quest takes place between the first two series: after the events of The Darkest Hour and before Midnight. Firestar's Quest was put under the title Warriors: Super Edition, as a special edition extra long book.

== Synopsis ==
Firestar's Quest takes place between The Darkest Hour and Midnight. The novel follows Firestar, leader of ThunderClan (one of four Clans of wild cats living in a fictional forest) on a journey to find a fifth lost Clan of the forest called SkyClan. Firestar and his mate Sandstorm journey upriver in order to rebuild the long-lost Clan. When they arrive at the Clan's former home, they meet Skywatcher, a descendant of SkyClan, who tells them about SkyClan's story, and shows them the Whispering Cave, they also find SkyClan's old home deserted, the caves strangely marked with tiny claw marks resembling those of rats. Firestar gathers together Leafdapple, Sparrowpelt, Sharpclaw, Echosong, Rainfur, Petalnose, Clovertail, Patchfoot, Shortwhisker, Cherrytail, Sagekit, Mintkit, Tinypaw, Rockpaw, and Bouncepaw. Eventually, Firestar re-establishes the Clan and helps the Clan fight the force that destroyed the ancient SkyClan: rats. Though SkyClan emerges victorious, the warrior Rainfur is killed and Firestar loses his second life. As Firestar and Sandstorm prepare to return home, Leafdapple is made the leader and renamed Leafstar on the Sky Rock, which is used to connect to the SkyClan ancestors. Sharpclaw is made deputy of SkyClan, and Echosong becomes the medicine cat.

In the epilogue, Sandstorm and Firestar's new kits are born. They decide to name one Squirrelkit (after her bushy, squirrel-like tail), and the other Leafkit (in honor of SkyClan's new leader, Leafstar). SkyClan blood runs through ThunderClan in cats such as Tigerclaw from his ancestor Cloudstar, a leader of SkyClan from when they lived alongside the other four Clans.

Before Firestar left the forest, a whole series of events happened that weren't shown in The New Prophecy. Such events included the warrior Longtail losing his sight when a rabbit clawed his eyes, Willowpelt being killed by a badger, and Bramblepaw receiving his warrior name; Brambleclaw. Additionally, Sootpaw got a new mentor, Thornclaw. This book is also the origin of the prophecy "There will be three, kin of your kin, who hold the power of the stars in their paws." The prophecy was passed on to Firestar by Skywatcher.

== Publication history ==
HarperCollins published the hardcover edition of Firestar's Quest and released it on 21 August 2007. The book had a 150,000 first release. HarperTrophy, an imprint of HarperCollins, released the paperback version of Firestar's Quest on 13 May 2008. Russia has published a translation of Firestar's Quest. The German version of the book has also been released as both a hardcover and audiobook. The United States, the United Kingdom, and Canada have English versions of Firestar's Quest. Canada launched the book early on 9 August 2007. Firestar's Quest ended up on many bestseller lists, including the New York Times Best Seller list.

=== Sequel ===
After the publication of the novel, Holmes confirmed the possibility of seeing SkyClan again.

SkyClan's Destiny, the third super edition and sequel tells of a civil war in SkyClan and was released on 3 August 2010. SkyClan was also brought back in the SkyClan and the Stranger manga, including The Rescue, Beyond the Code, and After the Flood. These detail how Sol lived in SkyClan for a time and shows how he came to have such a strong vendetta against the Clans.

== Critical reception ==
A reviewer from Children's Literature gave a very positive review, calling Firestar's Quest a "fantastic extension" to the Warriors series, and near the end of the review, the critic said Firestar's Quest showed that the Warriors books had evolved "from simply entertaining to thought provoking adventures". A review by Booklist noted the longer length of the book and also praised the mission and new characters introduced in the book. Publishers Weekly also gave a positive review writing "Fans of the Warriors books will excitedly delve into Firestar's Quest, the latest edition to Erin Hunter's bestselling series."
