= Ravenpaw's Path =

OEL manga trilogy by Erin Hunter

- Cover of Shattered Peace, the first book in the trilogy
- Shattered Peace; A Clan in Need; The Heart of a Warrior
- Author: Erin Hunter
- Illustrator: James L. Barry
- Language: English
- Genre: Children's literature Fantasy
- Publisher: HarperCollins
- Published: 24 November 2009 – 3 August 2010

Ravenpaw's Path is a trilogy of original English-language manga in the Warriors series published by Tokyopop and HarperCollins. It consists of three parts, originally published as independent books: Shattered Peace (24 November 2009), A Clan in Need (23 March 2010), and The Heart of a Warrior (3 August 2010). All three books were written by Dan Jolley (under the pseudonym Erin Hunter) and illustrated by James L. Barry. The three books were colored and republished in a single book on 26 June 2018.

== Plot summary ==
=== Shattered Peace ===
Ravenpaw lives on a farm with another cat named Barley. They have relatively simple lives, before a group of strays show up to their barn. One of the strays is about to give birth, so Ravenpaw and Barley allow the group to stay.

The group of strays begin to take advantage of Ravenpaw's kindness, drawing suspicion from Barley. Eventually, the group of strays decides that it is time for them to move on, and they leave the barn.

The next night, the barn catches fire, and Ravenpaw and Barley narrowly escape. They find the group of strays back on the farm, but this time, the strays attack several of the farm's chickens and fight Ravenpaw and Barley. It is revealed that the strays are former members of BloodClan, a group that Barley belonged to in his youth. The BloodClan cats chase the two off the property, and they are unsure of what to do before Ravenpaw realizes in a dream he can ask for help from his former Clan, ThunderClan.

=== A Clan in Need ===
Ravenpaw and Barley travel to ThunderClan's camp, where they meet with its leader, Firestar, a childhood friend of Ravenpaw's. Firestar reveals that BloodClan cats have been harassing his Clan as well, so he cannot immediately spare cats to help, but he invites the two to stay at his camp.

Firestar gathers a battle patrol to take the fight to BloodClan's camp. They fight, and ThunderClan wins. BloodClan's leaders, Snake and Ice, who are also Barley's brothers, try to avoid punishment by claiming that the rest of BloodClan is at fault. BloodClan turns on them and drives their leaders away. The ThunderClan cats leave, and Firestar promises Ravenpaw their next task will be to drive the other BloodClan cats from the farm.

=== The Heart of a Warrior ===
A battle patrol is gathered to return to Ravenpaw and Barley's farm to drive out the remaining BloodClan cats on the property. Firestar makes a plan to ambush the strays in their sleep, but the plan is foiled, and they are given away by chickens as they attempt to sneak into the barn in which the strays have been staying. There turns out to be a far larger amount of strays living in the barn than originally anticipated, some of whom are BloodClan refugees. The farmer hears the cats fighting and scares them all off.

ThunderClan regroups, and they return to the barn and drive the strays out of it in another battle. The only BloodClan cats left after the battle are Barley's brothers, Snake and Ice, who have returned to using their birth names, Hoot and Jumper. Once the battle is won, the ThunderClan cats leave, and Ravenpaw and Barley return to life on the farm. Barley reluctantly allows his brothers to stay on the farm with them.

Hoot and Jumper are rude to Ravenpaw, and do not respect the rules of the farm. Ultimately, Barley kicks the two out, and the barn is left to just Ravenpaw and Barley again.

== Critical reception ==
Joanna K. Fabicon, writing for School Library Journal on A Clan in Need, described that "sharply drawn feral and ferocious expressions heighten tension whenever there is a standoff" and praised the book for allowing unfamiliar readers to "easily become immersed in the story", while also writing that the original drawings were black-and-white, lacking in color compared to the "gloriously described cat fur".
