= The Darkest Hour (Hunter novel) =

2004 novel by Erin Hunter

- First edition cover
- Author: Erin Hunter
- Cover artist: Wayne McLoughlin
- Language: English
- Series: Warriors
- Genre: Children's literature Fantasy novel
- Publisher: HarperCollins
- Publication date: 1 October 2004
- Publication place: United States; United Kingdom
- Media type: Print (hardback & paperback)
- Pages: 336 (first edition, hardback)
- ISBN: 978-0-06-000007-3 (first edition, hardback)
- OCLC: 54035392
- LC Class: PZ7.H916625 Dar 2004
- Preceded by: A Dangerous Path
- Followed by: Ravenpaw's Path; Firestar's Quest; Midnight

The Darkest Hour is a young adult fantasy novel, the sixth and final book in the original Warriors series by Erin Hunter, telling the story of the fictional cat Firestar. The series revolves around a group of wild cats living in four Clans, ThunderClan, RiverClan, WindClan, and ShadowClan. It was published on 1 October 2004 by HarperCollins. The story chronicles the events directly after A Dangerous Path and leads to the final battle for the forest. It is the final installment in the first Warriors story arc, The Prophecies Begin.

== Plot ==
Firestar is the leader of ThunderClan, succeeding the former leader, Bluestar, when she drowned saving ThunderClan from a pack of wild dogs. As he receives his nine lives at the Moonstone, StarClan gives him a prophecy: "Four will become two, lion and tiger will meet in battle, and blood will rule the forest."

Firestar chooses Whitestorm, a senior warrior who is well admired and respected, as his deputy. During the next Gathering, Tigerstar, ShadowClan's treacherous leader, tries to unite all the clans as one, claiming that they would be stronger together. Leopardstar, RiverClan's leader, has already agreed, but Tallstar, leader of WindClan, and Firestar both refuse to join this alliance, which Tigerstar has named "TigerClan", after a mythical ancient Clan.

Later, Graystripe asks Firestar if he can quickly check on his kits in TigerClan. Firestar agrees, and he and Graystripe, accompanied by Ravenpaw, their old friend, all sneak into TigerClan territory. In TigerClan territory, they find Stormpaw and Featherpaw, Graystripe's kits, along with Mistyfoot and Stonefur, Bluestar's kits, being held as prisoners in TigerClan. The three friends rescue Stormpaw, Featherpaw and Mistyfoot, but Stonefur is killed by two ShadowClan warriors.

In an attempt to force Firestar and Tallstar into joining his clan, Tigerstar introduces BloodClan, a group of rogue cats who live in alleys in Twoleg (human) territory. When ThunderClan and WindClan's leaders still do not agree, Tigerstar orders BloodClan to fight for him, though the cats do not, for they take orders only from their leader, Scourge. Firestar then reveals the treachery Tigerstar has done, killing ThunderClan's former deputy, Redtail, for power. Scourge then says that there will be no battle. Tigerstar, enraged, attacks Scourge, but Scourge kills him easily by slicing him from chin to tail with his claws, causing Tigerstar to lose all nine of his lives. Scourge then warns the clans that they have three days to leave the forest, or else BloodClan will fight with them. In response, the clans unite as one and form an alliance called LionClan to face this threat.

During the battle, Whitestorm is killed by Bone, BloodClan's second in command, but Bone is killed soon afterwards by a group of Clan apprentices. Graystripe becomes the new deputy of ThunderClan. The battle is won when Firestar kills Scourge, though he loses one of his own nine lives in the process. Without their leader, BloodClan scatters. With the threat of BloodClan gone, the four Clans dissolve their alliance and become independent from one another once more.

== Publication history ==
The book was first released in the US on 5 October 2004 as a hardcover. It was later released as a paperback on 4 October 2005, and as an e-book on 4 September 2007. The book has also been published in German, Chinese, Japanese, French, Russian, and Korean.

== Themes ==
BookLoons notes that the book "stresses the importance of caring and community". This is shown to be true, as the Clans are forced to put aside their differences and squabbles with one another, in order to team up against a greater threat, BloodClan.

== Critical reception ==
The Darkest Hour received critical acclaim. Hilary Williamson wrote: "The Darkest Hour is the best yet in this thrilling series of feline adventure, that also stresses the importance of caring and community". A reviewer for Booklist called The Darkest Hour "tension-filled". A reviewer for The Mary Sue wrote that The Darkest Hour featured "one of the best villains in any young adult literature I've read".
