= Warrior's Refuge =

2007 OEL manga by Erin Hunter

- Cover showing Graystripe and Mille facing off against two dogs.
- Author: Erin Hunter
- Language: English
- Series: Warriors
- Genre: Children's, fantasy
- Publisher: HarperCollins and Tokyopop
- Publication date: 26 December 2007
- Publication place: United States
- Media type: Print (paperback)
- Pages: 112
- Preceded by: The Lost Warrior
- Followed by: Warrior's Return

Warrior's Refuge is the second in an original English-language manga trilogy based on the best-selling book series Warriors by Erin Hunter. The manga was published by the distributor Tokyopop, and was released on 26 December 2007 along with Dark River, the second book in Warriors: Power of Three. It follows Graystripe and Millie as they journey to find ThunderClan. It is drawn by James L. Barry.

== Plot summary ==
The book opens with a short summary of the past events of the previous book, The Lost Warrior. Coming to the current time, Graystripe and his traveling companion, Millie, can see Highstones in the distance. As they are traveling through a corn field, a combine pursues them. Graystripe and Millie are separated as they flee from the monster. Graystripe manages to get to a nearby barn, and asks for help from the cats inhabiting the barn. The barn cats agree to help Graystripe find Millie. They find Millie and learn the hard corn leaves cut and damaged Millie's eyes. Graystripe and Millie are allowed to stay until she recovers. Husker, one of the barn cats explains to the two cats that they used to live in the nearby Twoleg nest (human house). Unfortunately, the Twolegs (humans) died, and a new family moved in. The new residents disliked the cats, so they were chased out. They had lived in the barn ever since and had to deal with the Twoleg's dogs.

Graystripe and Millie face the pet dogs of the family after they wander into the barn. Millie can speak dog and is able to send the dogs away. The barn cats are amazed by Millie's ability and she teaches them how to speak dog. A few days later, Millie and Graystripe see a Twoleg kit in pursuit of a frog. She approaches dangerously close to the edge of a pond, almost falling into it. Graystripe manages to catch the child's attention and lead her away. The Twoleg's parents are very grateful to the cats. Over time, the Twolegs accept the barn cats as well and even adopt them as their kittypets through a plan of Graystripe's. The two travelers continue their route towards home. However, when they arrive at the forest, they find the territory is destroyed and ThunderClan is gone.

== Pre-release history ==
HarperCollins and Tokyopop had agreed to publish a trilogy of Graystripe manga volumes, announced in February 2007. It was written by Erin Hunter and Dan Jolley, and illustrated by James L. Barry.

== Publication history ==
Warrior's Refuge was published on 26 December 2007. It was released on the same day as Dark River, the second book in the Warriors: Power of Three series. Warrior's Refuge has only been published as a paperback.

== Critical reception ==
School Library Journal gave the book a mixed review praising "Millie's bravery", but also criticizing how scratchy text used when humans talk seems very odd when used with the toddlers. The review also criticized how the "artwork is merely competent and the story (which was not written by Hunter) is slight".
