= A Dangerous Path =

2004 novel by Erin Hunter

- First edition cover
- Author: Erin Hunter
- Cover artist: Wayne McLoughlin
- Language: English
- Series: Warriors
- Genre: Children's literature Fantasy novel
- Published: 1 June 2004 (Avon)
- Publication place: United States
- Media type: Print (Paperback and Hardcover)
- Pages: 336
- ISBN: 978-0-06-052565-1
- Preceded by: Rising Storm
- Followed by: The Darkest Hour

A Dangerous Path is a fantasy novel, the fifth book in the Warriors series, written under the pseudonym of Erin Hunter. This individual book was written by Cherith Baldry. The story revolves around Fireheart, deputy of ThunderClan, as he attempts to keep his Clan safe with the help of his ailing leader, while fighting off outside threats such as dogs and enemy Clans.

The book was first published in the US as a hardcover on 1 June 2004. It has since been published as a paperback and as an e-book, and been published in other countries. A Dangerous Path has also been published in foreign languages, including French and Chinese. The book received positive reviews from reviewers such as Booklist and Horn Book Review, who praised the tensions and fast pace.

== Synopsis ==
=== Setting ===
The story takes place in a fictional forest populated by four groups of feral cats, ThunderClan, RiverClan, WindClan and ShadowClan. Each Clan has their own territory in which they live and hunt for prey in. They protect themselves from enemies such as rival Clans and wild animals. The story follows Fireheart and his adventures in ThunderClan.

The forest is based on New Forest, which is located in Southern England. Besides New Forest, Loch Lomond, the Scottish Highlands, and the Forest of Dean also inspired the fictional locales in the novel.

== Plot ==
Prey in ThunderClan's territory has gone missing, and Fireheart believes that Tigerstar, leader of ShadowClan, is behind it. Meanwhile, Bluestar is mentally shaken by Tigerstar's betrayal, for she once thought he was a loyal warrior and deputy. Bluestar believes that if StarClan had been on her side, none of this would have happened. She refuses to believe in StarClan, and declares war with them, shocking her clanmates.

Bluestar decides to name Cloudpaw a warrior because he does not believe in StarClan. Two other apprentices, Swiftpaw and Brightpaw, both choose to track down the animals who have been stealing ThunderClan's prey. Unfortunately, the prey-stealers are a pack of deadly dogs. Swiftpaw is killed, and Brightpaw loses half of her face, making her blind in one eye. Bluestar, thinking Brightpaw will die, promotes Brightpaw to the status of a warrior, but names her Lostface. Meanwhile, Graystripe returns to ThunderClan, and his loyalty is questioned among ThunderClan.

Clan life returns to normal, but Fireheart is curious about the dogs. He asks Lostface about them, but she only repeats a few words: "Pack, pack, kill, kill." Whitestorm reports to Fireheart that he and his patrol smelled dogs near Snakerocks. Fireheart goes to investigate. He finds a trail of dead rabbits that lead to the body of Brindleface, the sweet and gentle queen. She had been killed by Tigerstar in order for the dogs to have a taste of cat blood. Fireheart orders a patrol to discard the rabbits.

After Brindleface's burial, ThunderClan evacuates to Sunningrocks. Bluestar is still mentally unstable, so it is up to Fireheart to get rid of the dogs. He and the senior warriors come up with a plan to lead the dogs over the edge of the gorge. The plan works; each cat successfully leads the pack closer to the gorge, breaking away from the group once they lead the dogs to a certain spot, where a fresh runner lies in wait so they can lead the dogs to the next point. Fireheart, the last in line, keeps a good distance from the dogs, but, Tigerstar comes from the bushes and pins Fireheart down, allowing the dogs to catch up. When it seems like Fireheart is about to die, Bluestar, now clear of mind, pushes the pack leader off the edge of the gorge, taking her with it.

Fireheart leaps down the cliff into the river and dives in to save Bluestar. Fireheart manages to get a hold on her, but is barely able to keep their heads above the water. However, Bluestar's RiverClan children, Stonefur and Mistyfoot, discover Fireheart struggling in the river, trying to save Bluestar, and help drag the two cats to the bank. There, Bluestar pleads forgiveness to her kits for lying to them about who their parents were. They forgive her, as they had not known their true heritage until then. Bluestar then tells Fireheart that she realized her Clanmates were not all traitors. She also tells him that he is now the leader of ThunderClan. With that, she loses her final life, and her spirit is sent to StarClan.

Fireheart is overcome with grief. Mistyfoot asks if she and Stonefur can help carry her back to the ThunderClan camp and sit vigil for her.

== Main characters ==
- Fireheart, young and courageous deputy of ThunderClan
- Tigerstar, the leader of ShadowClan; formerly of ThunderClan; staged an attack on ThunderClan and was exiled for it
- Bluestar, ailing leader of ThunderClan
- Stonefur, deputy of RiverClan, Mistyfoot's brother and Bluestar's kit
- Mistyfoot, warrior of RiverClan, Stonefur's sister and Bluestar's kit
- Cloudpaw (later Cloudtail), Fireheart's unruly apprentice and nephew; was born as a kittypet (housecat)
- Swiftpaw, an apprentice who dies to a dog pack
- Brightpaw (later Lostface), an apprentice who is badly disfigured by a dog pack
- Sandstorm, Fireheart's mate
- Whitestorm, a senior warrior of ThunderClan
- Brindleface, gentle ThunderClan queen who is slaughtered by Tigerstar
- Cinderpelt, ThunderClan's medicine cat, who has a permanent limp
- Graystripe, Fireheart's best friend

== Publication history ==
The book was first published in the US as a hardcover on 1 June 2004 by HarperCollins. It was then published as a paperback on 24 May 2005 and an e-book on 13 October 2009. A Dangerous Path was also published in the UK as a paperback on 2 April 2007 and in Canada as a hardcover on 20 May 2004. The book has also been published in foreign languages such as German, Japanese, French, Russian and Korean. The Chinese version was published on 31 December 2008 and is packaged with a 3D trading card of Tigerstar.

== Critical reception ==
A Dangerous Path received positive reception. A BookLoons review praised the rising tension in the book. Booklist called the book exciting and praised the fast pace writing "Hunter maintains the established characterizations of her sentient cats, who still retain their feline natures. With compelling intrigue and fast-paced actions, this is one of the most exciting books in the series". In a review for both Rising Storm and A Dangerous Path, Horn Book Review praised the complex characters.
