= The Rise of Scourge =

2008 OEL manga by Erin Hunter

- Author: Erin Hunter and Dan Jolley
- Illustrator: Bettina Kurkoski
- Cover artist: Bettina Kurkoski
- Language: English
- Series: Warriors
- Genre: Children's, Fantasy novel
- Publisher: HarperCollins
- Publication date: 24 June 2008
- Publication place: United States
- Media type: Print (paperback)
- Pages: pp 112
- ISBN: 978-0-06-147867-3
- OCLC: 179808352

The Rise of Scourge is an original English-language manga written by Erin Hunter and Dan Jolley, and illustrated by Bettina Kurkoski as part of the Warriors series. The Rise of Scourge is a stand-alone manga that details the rise to power of the BloodClan leader, Scourge. It was re-released in colour on 12 March 2024.

== Plot summary ==
Tiny is the smallest of Quince's litter of three kittens, which also includes Socks and Ruby. His brother and sister constantly bully him because of his size. Later, humans come to adopt Socks and Ruby, but they leave Tiny. Ruby tells him that unwanted kittens like him are thrown into the river.

Tiny runs into the forest to escape being thrown into the river. He is met by a ThunderClan patrol consisting of Bluefur, Thistleclaw, and Thistleclaw's apprentice, Tigerpaw. Tigerpaw attempts to kill Tiny, but is stopped at the last second by Bluefur, who reminds him of the warrior code.

Tiny goes to the city and is laughed at for his collar. He finds a dog tooth, and attempts to rip his collar with it, but it ends up embedded in the collar instead. When other cats ask him about it, Tiny lies and says that he ripped it out of a dog's mouth after killing it, in an attempt to impress them. The story spreads, and soon two loners, Bone and Brick, come ask him to help get rid of a dog that is keeping the stray cats from a dumpster full of food. When Tiny confronts the dog, it is startled by Tiny's shadow, and runs away. Impressed, the cats congratulate him, and one asks what his name is. Tiny decides on the spot to rename himself Scourge, after recalling something his mother told him about forest cats being "a scourge on the name of all good cats".

Later, Scourge is asked to help drive away a gang of forest cats that are causing trouble for the strays. When the forest cats tease him because of his size, he kills one of them to show the cats from the gang as well as his own cats what he is capable of. The forest cats are shocked and decide to leave.

Scourge is treated as a sort of leader among the city cats after the incident, and he becomes more of a dictator to them, though he remains discontent. After a while, his littermates, Socks and Ruby, come to him for help because their owners abandoned them. He reprimands them for being mean to him when he was young, but ultimately allows them to eat something before banishing them from his territory. A few years later, Tigerpaw, now Tigerstar, comes to BloodClan, asking for their help in defeating his own enemies. Scourge agrees to help them so that he can take revenge on Tigerstar. He bides his time, and during a meeting with the Clans of the forest, Tigerstar attacks him, and he is given the opportunity to kill him. He does so, slicing Tigerstar open from chin to tail, with claws reinforced by dogs' teeth. Scourge is finally content with his victory over Tigerstar.

== Critical reception ==
Lisa Goldstein, writing for the School Library Journal, stated that the illustrations in The Rise of Scourge were "more detailed" compared to the previous Warriors manga, and that the imagery "effectively bring[s] out the cats' personalities and characters". During the week of 3 July 2008, the book was ranked #127th on USA Today's bestsellers list.

== Publication history ==
- The Rise of Scourge (EN), HarperCollins (paperback), 24 June 2008
- Бич: путь к власти (RU), Tokyopop (paperback), October 2010
- 长鞭崛起 (CHN), Future Publishing (paperback), 1 January 2012
- The Rise of Scourge (EN), HarperCollins (e-book), 1 December 2015
- Geißels Rache (DE), POPCOM (paperback), 17 December 2015
- Bicz. Poczatek legendy (PL), Zysk i S-ka (paperback), 1 January 2018
- The Rise of Scourge (EN), HarperCollins (paperback; colored reprint), 12 March 2024
