= SkyClan's Destiny =

2010 novel by Erin Hunter

- Hardcover Edition
- Author: Erin Hunter
- Cover artist: Wayne McLoughlin
- Language: English
- Series: Warriors
- Genre: Children's literature Fantasy novel
- Publisher: HarperCollins
- Publication date: 3 August 2010
- Media type: Print (hardback)
- Pages: 462+14 for manga edition
- ISBN: 978-0-06-169994-8
- Preceded by: Firestar's Quest

SkyClan's Destiny is a children's fantasy novel, the third super edition in the Warriors series. It was written under the pen name of Erin Hunter. Victoria Holmes revealed in an AuthorTracker email that she had developed the general idea for the book quickly, but it took a while to find the right ending. The book follows SkyClan six months after Firestar and Sandstorm left the gorge. The Clan experiences internal conflict regarding house cats who train in SkyClan during the day, but leave at night to return to their human owners. Later, four loners, Stick, Cora, Coal and Shorty, cats that Firestar met on his quest also become a topic of debate in the Clan. The major themes in the book are rebellion and the fact that SkyClan has to figure its destiny without the help of other Clans or their warriors ancestors.

== Plot ==
In present-day SkyClan, it is six months since Firestar went to the gorge and reformed SkyClan (Firestar's Quest). The new SkyClan has added loners, rogues, and former kittypets to the Clan. There are also kittypets that help the Clan in the day, but return to their humans at night. They are called "daylight warriors". Leafstar invites them into the Clan to help patrol and hunt. However, not everyone respects the daylight warriors. Cats such as Sharpclaw call them "kitty warriors" feeling they are not loyal to the Clan by leaving at night. The daylight warriors are Billystorm, Ebonyclaw, Frecklepaw, Snookpaw, Harveymoon, and Macgyver. Leafstar tries to keep the tensions low between the daylight warriors and regular warriors, but many regular warriors still make fun of the daylight warriors behind their backs.

One day, Leafstar receives a dream from Spottedleaf, an old medicine cat of ThunderClan who helped SkyClan when Firestar first reformed the Clan. She sees cats and they say, "This is the leaf-bare of my Clan. Greenleaf will come, but it will bring even greater storms than these. SkyClan will need deeper roots if it is to survive." The next day, Leafstar visits the Clan's medicine cat Echosong and they realize they each had the same dream. Meanwhile, Leafstar starts to develop feelings for Billystorm.

Later, Stick, Cora, Coal and Shorty, four cats Firestar met on his quest, arrive at the gorge. They stay with the Clan and learn battle moves, hunting techniques. In exchange, Stick teaches the Clan how to destroy a rat family that lives in a dump in the Clan's territory. After defeating the rats the four loners begin to lead patrols despite the fact that Sharpclaw still does not let the daylight warriors lead patrol and they have been around longer.

One day, Leafstar follows a group of SkyClan's cats visiting the nearby town. There she realizes that the loners came to recruit help to defeat a group of cats that steal prey in their town. In the end, Leafstar agrees to help though states that she will not kill anyone. The battle is fierce and ends in SkyClan's victory, but Stick's daughter Red is killed protecting her mate who Stick tried to kill since he thinks that Red's mate threatened her to join them. Stick becomes even more infuriated when Leafstar calls off her warriors from killing anyone, a policy he disapproves of.

Returning to her Clan, Leafstar sets up rules for visiting cats in order to prevent any future conflicts. She makes it so that visiting cats must help hunt every day, and the Clan shall not teach any fighting moves until they have spent a month in the Clan and that SkyClan is "a proud, independent Clan with a code and honor of our own."

== Publication history ==
The book was first released in both e-book and hardcover format on 3 August 2010 in the US and in both Canada and the UK. HarperCollins gave the book a 150,000 first print.

== Critical reception ==
School Library Journal felt that readers would be drawn into the cat's fight for survival. The review also praised how well developed the characters are and the book has "a range of emotions and thoughts that draw readers into their dilemmas". The conclusion was praised as it ended "where the traits of maturity, compassion, loyalty, and strength are upheld as desirable".
