= The Lost Warrior (comics) =

2007 OEL manga by Erin Hunter

- First edition cover, featuring Graystripe and Millie squaring off against Duke and his gang.
- Author: Erin Hunter
- Language: English
- Series: Warriors
- Genre: Children's, Fantasy
- Publisher: HarperCollins and Tokyopop
- Publication date: 24 April 2007
- Publication place: United States
- Media type: Print (Hardback & Paperback)
- Pages: 112
- Preceded by: Dawn
- Followed by: Warrior's Refuge

The Lost Warrior is the first in an original English-language manga trilogy based on the best-selling book series Warriors by Erin Hunter. The manga was published by the distributor Tokyopop, and was released on 24 April 2007. It follows Graystripe's adventures trying to escape from the Twolegs, who have taken him in as their kittypet. It is drawn by James L. Barry.

== Plot summary ==
The Lost Warrior opens with narration from Graystripe, a warrior who was separated from his Clan, ThunderClan, after being kidnapped by humans while trying to deforest his home. He is then taken in as a house cat by a Twoleg (human) family. He somewhat likes the Twolegs and their kits but he cannot stand to be away from his Clan and his fellow warriors. He makes an attempt to flee but gets lost in Twolegplace and battles with a kittypet named Duke. After being forced to flee the fight, Graystripe is led back to the nest he has been staying in by a female kittypet named Millie, who assures him that losing to Duke is nothing to be ashamed of. The two cats get to know each other better and Millie finds a small forest in the middle of the Twolegplace. She then shows it to Graystripe and asks him to teach her how to hunt and fight after learning of his previous life. After a dream in which he is visited by his deceased mate, Silverstream, and his daughter Feathertail, and another fight with Duke and his allies, Graystripe finally makes the decision to try to return to ThunderClan. In another dream about Silverstream, after Graystripe tells Silverstream that he wishes he could be with her, Silverstream reminds him that his place is with ThunderClan. She also tells him that he already has a traveling companion. Later, Graystripe asks Millie to come with him to ThunderClan, and is taken aback at her refusal. He then leaves for ThunderClan alone. Graystripe ends up getting lost in Twolegplace for days before collapsing from exhaustion. Millie changes her mind and goes out to catch up to Graystripe. Upon meeting him, she discovers him feverish and weak; he even calls her by Silverstream's name. Millie nurses him back to health and asks him about Silverstream. Then the two set off to try to find ThunderClan. What they don't realize is that ThunderClan, along with the rest of the Clans, no longer resides in the forest.

== Characters ==
- Graystripe – the main character, a kidnapped warrior of ThunderClan. During the events of Dawn, he was captured by Twolegs, and adopted by a loving family. Unfamiliar with the ways of Twolegplace, and his memories of wild life fast fading, Graystripe almost sinks into despair, but Millie helps him, and he trains her as a warrior, recalling his own love of the wild. At the end of this book, he and Millie are seen setting off on a long journey, determined to reach the Clans, no matter what it takes.
- Millie – a former kittypet (house cat). She meets Graystripe in Twolegplace and helps him in many ways physically and emotionally. She chooses to come with him on his quest, and proves her tenacity and courage many times during the trilogy. A useful trait of Millie's is the ability to speak dog, which she uses to great effect in Warrior's Refuge. In the Power of Three series, this skill is never mentioned, but Lionblaze notes that Millie is extremely good at fighting dogs.
- Duke and his friends – a trio of strong and territorial kittypets. They battle and beat Graystripe when he first arrives, but by the end of the book, the combined efforts of a strengthened Graystripe and newly trained Millie is enough to fight them off. Ironically, as Duke leaves in shame, he hypocritically calls Graystripe 'savage', but Graystripe, remembering what it means to be a warrior, does not listen to him, and walks proudly away with his 'apprentice', Millie. Duke and his cronies are not seen for the rest of the manga series.

== Reception ==
The Lost Warrior was praised by Publishers Weekly, which felt that "Many little (and perhaps some larger) girls will find this kitty fantasy irresistible". School Library Journal praised how "the "manga-inspired" artwork and panels work well with the story. The format allows Graystripe's imagination and emotions to be expressed". The reviewer felt that the book was too short and had little action. Leroy Douresseaux praised both the writing and artwork of the book: "Writer Dan Jolley hits the ground running, showing the chops of a veteran comic book writer by concisely and quickly bringing the reader into Erin Hunter's world of Warriors...artist James Barry draws in a manner that is similar to animated films".

== Publication list ==
- The Lost Warrior (EN), HarperCollins (paperback), 24 April 2007
- The Lost Warrior (EN), HarperCollins (paperback alternate), 2007
- The Lost Warrior (EN), HarperCollins (paperback, import), 2008
- The Lost Warrior (EN), HarperCollins (library binding), 1 May 2007
- The Lost Warrior (EN), HarperCollins (library binding), September 2007
- Der verlorene Krieger (DE), Tokyopop (paperback), 2008
- Ztracený válečník (CZ), Zonerpress (paperback), 2008
- Kadonnut soturi (FI), Pauna Media Group (paperpack), 2009
- Пропавший воитель (RU), Tokyopop (paperback), 14 October 2010
- Graustreif und Millie (DE), Tokyopop (paperback), 14 October 2010
- The Lost Warrior (EN), HarperCollins (full color reprint), 8 August 2017
