= Tui T. Sutherland =

American children's book author (born 1978)

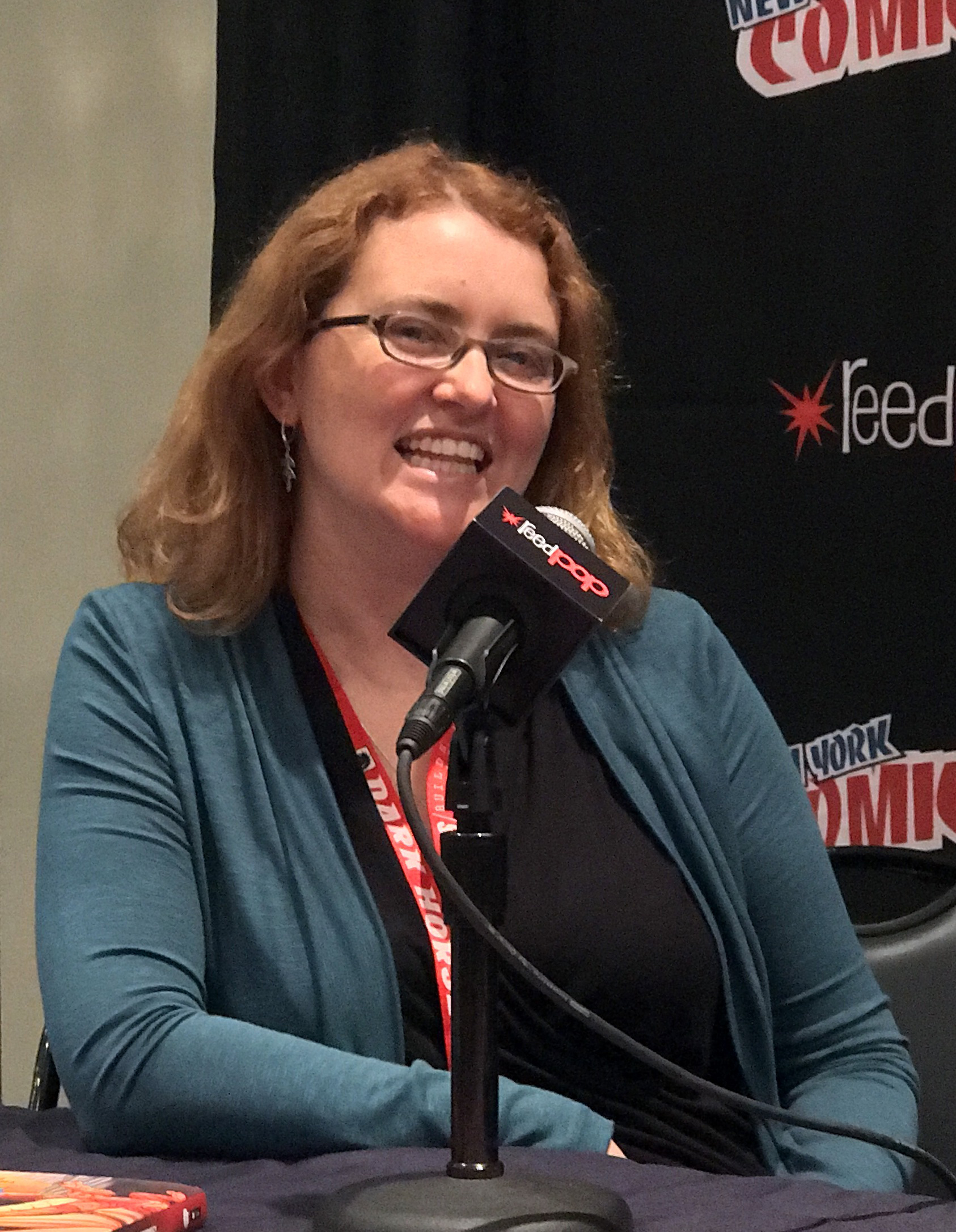
- Sutherland at the 2017 New York Comic Con
- Born: Tui Tamara Sutherland; July 31, 1978 (age 48); Caracas, Venezuela
- Education: Williams College
- Occupation: Author
- Children: 2
- Writing career
- Pen name: Heather Williams; Erin Hunter (shared); Rob Kidd (shared); Tamara Summers
- Genre: Children's literature
- Notable work: Wings of Fire (novel series)
- Website: tuibooks.com

Tui Tamara Sutherland (born July 31, 1978) is an American children's book author who has written more than 60 books under her own name and under several pen names. In 2009, she won $46,200 over three games on Jeopardy! She is best known for writing the Wings of Fire series of dragon fantasy novels. Sutherland's books have sold over 67 million copies.

== Early life and education ==
Tui T. Sutherland was born on July 31, 1978, in Caracas, Venezuela. Her mother, who was from New Zealand, named her after the tūī, a bird native to that country. Sutherland lived in Asunción, Paraguay, Miami, Florida, and Santo Domingo, Dominican Republic, for short periods before moving to New Jersey in high school. While in high school she began doing theater, mostly backstage work. She obtained a Bachelor of Arts in English Literature from Williams College in 1998, writing her college thesis about Ophelia from William Shakespeare's Hamlet, then earned a Master of Arts in Art History. Sutherland's thesis was titled The beautified Ophelia: Shakespeare in British Art, 1850-1900.

Sutherland abandoned ideas of a career in theater in favor of writing children's books after "she partook in creative writing courses over six months in New Zealand", a decision she half-joked allowed her career path "to be far more stable and lucrative".

== Career ==
Sutherland began her professional literary career as an editor in Brooklyn, New York, at Grosset & Dunlap, then at HarperCollins; her debut solo work, This Must Be Love (a retelling of A Midsummer Night's Dream), was published in 2004. She achieved initial commercial success on the New York Times bestseller list with her junior novel adaptation of the screenplay for Pirates of the Caribbean: At World's End, and joined the Erin Hunter team alongside Victoria Holmes, Kate Cary and Cherith Baldry on the Warriors and Seekers novel series, from the perspective of cats and bears respectively. Her success during this time, coupled with what she learned about the inside workings of the publishing industry, helped her work up the courage to write and see through to publication several books of her own. Sutherland eventually quit her position as an editor to write full-time and later moved to Watertown, Massachusetts.

Sutherland has written books under her actual name (or an initialized variation) as well as under pseudonyms and pen names, including Tamara Summers, Heather Williams, and Rob Kidd, the latter of which was shared.

After the conclusion of her dog-focused Pet Trouble series, Sutherland pitched her agent Steven Malk and the team at Scholastic Inc. about writing an epic fantasy series starring dragons as the focus. With Amanda Maciel as her editor, the Wings of Fire series debuted on July 1, 2012 to commercial success, generally receiving mixed to positive critical reviews. Over time the series gradually amassed a fan following and became an international bestseller.

On May 6, 2025, Variety announced Sutherland would be executive producer and co-writer of an animated television adaptation of Wings of Fire for Amazon Prime Video and Jack Tar Productions, alongside showrunner and executive producer Aaron J. Waltke.

== Personal life ==
Sutherland grew up sharing original ideas and exploring the classics with her younger sister Kari. She married her husband Adam in October 2007, and the two live in Watertown, Massachusetts with their two sons.

Though she has generally refrained from revealing private details about her life in her frequent public events, Sutherland's religious background has been noted. She is known to borrow influences from a variety of religious traditions and backgrounds; she "attended a Baptist missionary school in Paraguay, studied Buddhism in college" and is raising her children with Judeo-Christian influences, having "married a wonderful Jewish man". Though she has woven philosophical and spiritual aspects from a variety of sources and traditions into her work, she has also said that "religion isn't something talked about as freely" in her daily life, instead hoping that her writing can open up discussions among readers and pose questions to contemplate in the freer, larger-than-life fantasy worlds she creates.

Sutherland has drawn inspiration from locations she has visited over the years, including the Waitomo Caves in New Zealand and the Amber Palace in India, and develops her fantasy worlds' environments through watching nature documentaries such as Planet Earth and Life in the Undergrowth.

Although she is not a member of the Writers Guild of America (WGA), Sutherland marched in support of the 2007-08 Writers Guild of America strike in Boston.

A long-time fan of Jeopardy!, Sutherland named the sixth dog in the Pet Trouble series after it. In 2009, she was a two-day champion on the show, winning a total of $46,200 over three episodes; the first two games she won by a fine margin, whereas she lost in her latter appearance as she did not wager enough money on the final clue; had she wagered everything, she would have won the game.

Sutherland began a free online newsletter in late June 2024.

== Bibliography ==
=== Individual titles ===
- Kermit's Mixed-Up Valentines (January 2, 2001, with Emily Sollinger; Out of Print)
- Meet Mo and Ella (February 1, 2001; Out of Print)
- Fun with Mo and Ella (February 1, 2002; Out of Print)
- Who Was Harry Houdini? (July 1, 2002, as Tui Sutherland)
- This Must Be Love (September 1, 2004; Out of Print)
- Pirates of the Caribbean: At World's End - The Junior Novelization (April 10, 2007, as T.T. Sutherland, Pirates of the Caribbean Junior Book #3; Out of Print)

=== Under pseudonym ===
==== As Erin Hunter ====
- Warriors: Secrets of the Clans (May 29, 2007, under Erin Hunter, Warriors Companion Book #1)
- Seekers: The Quest Begins (May 27, 2008, under Erin Hunter, Seekers Book #1)
- Seekers: Smoke Mountain (May 14, 2009, under Erin Hunter, Seekers Book #3)
- Seekers: Fire in the Sky (May 11, 2010, under Erin Hunter, Seekers Book #5)
- Seekers: The Melting Sea (June 5, 2012, under Erin Hunter, Seekers: Return to the Wild Book #2)

==== As Rob Kidd ====
- Legends of the Brethren Court: The Caribbean (October 14, 2008, under Rob Kidd, Legends of the Brethren Court Book #1; Out of Print)
- Legends of the Brethren Court: The East (December 9, 2008, under Rob Kidd, Legends of the Brethren Court Book #2; Out of Print)
- Legends of the Brethren Court: The Turning Tide (March 17, 2009, under Rob Kidd, Legends of the Brethren Court Book #3; Out of Print)
- Legends of the Brethren Court: Wild Waters (August 18, 2009, under Rob Kidd, Legends of the Brethren Court Book #4; Out of Print)
- Legends of the Brethren Court: Day of the Shadow (November 1, 2009, under Rob Kidd, Legends of the Brethren Court Book #5; Out of Print)

==== As Tamara Summers ====
- He's With Me (May 1, 2007, as Tamara Summers; Out of Print)
- Save the Date (April 29, 2008, as Tamara Summers; Out of Print)
- Never Bite a Boy on the First Date (September 16, 2009, as Tamara Summers; Out of Print)

==== As Heather Williams ====
- Nellie Oleson meets Laura Ingalls (September 1, 2007, as Heather Williams; Out of Print)
- Farmer Boy Goes West (February 14, 2012, as Heather Williams; Out of Print)

=== Anthologies ===
- "Skittering" (Half-Minute Horrors, Short Story Anthology, August 25, 2009; Out of Print)
- "The Incredibly Important True Story of Me!" (Lucky Dog: Twelve Tales of Rescued Dogs, Short Story Anthology, January 28, 2014; Out of Print)

=== Series ===
==== Avatars ====
- Avatars: So This Is How It Ends (October 1, 2006, Avatars Book #1; Out of Print)
- Avatars: Shadow Falling (October 1, 2007, Avatars Book #2; Out of Print)
- Kingdom of Twilight (October 1, 2008, Avatars Book #3; Out of Print)

==== Pet Trouble ====
- Pet Trouble: Runaway Retriever (April 1, 2009, as T.T. Sutherland, Pet Trouble Book #1)
- Pet Trouble: Loudest Beagle on the Block (April 1, 2009, as T.T. Sutherland, Pet Trouble Book #2)
- Pet Trouble: Mud-Puddle Poodle (July 1, 2009, as T.T. Sutherland, Pet Trouble Book #3)
- Pet Trouble: Bulldog Won't Budge (November 1, 2009, as T.T. Sutherland, Pet Trouble Book #4)
- Pet Trouble: Oh No, Newf! (February 1, 2010, as T.T. Sutherland, Pet Trouble Book #5)
- Pet Trouble: Smarty-Pants Sheltie (May 1, 2010, as T.T. Sutherland, Pet Trouble Book #6)
- Pet Trouble: Bad to the Bone Boxer (August 1, 2010, as T.T. Sutherland, Pet Trouble Book #7)
- Pet Trouble: Dachshund Disaster (November 1, 2010, as T.T. Sutherland, Pet Trouble Book #8)

==== The Menagerie ====
- The Menagerie (March 12, 2013, with Kari Sutherland, The Menagerie Book #1)
- The Menagerie: Dragon on Trial (March 11, 2014, with Kari Sutherland, The Menagerie Book #2)
- The Menagerie: Krakens and Lies (March 10, 2015, with Kari Sutherland, The Menagerie Book #3)

==== Spirit Animals ====
- Spirit Animals: Against the Tide (September 30, 2014, Spirit Animals Book #5)

==== Wings of Fire ====
- Wings of Fire: The Dragonet Prophecy (July 1, 2012, Wings of Fire Book #1)
- Wings of Fire: The Lost Heir (January 1, 2013, Wings of Fire Book #2)
- Wings of Fire: The Hidden Kingdom (May 28, 2013, Wings of Fire Book #3)
- Wings of Fire: The Dark Secret (October 29, 2013, Wings of Fire Book #4)
- Wings of Fire: The Brightest Night (March 25, 2014, Wings of Fire Book #5)
- Wings of Fire: Moon Rising (December 30, 2014, Wings of Fire Book #6)
- Wings of Fire: Winter Turning (June 30, 2015, Wings of Fire Book #7)
- Wings of Fire: Escaping Peril (December 29, 2015, Wings of Fire Book #8)
- Wings of Fire: Talons of Power (December 27, 2016, Wings of Fire Book #9)
- Wings of Fire: Darkness of Dragons (July 25, 2017, Wings of Fire Book #10)
- Wings of Fire: The Lost Continent (June 26, 2018, Wings of Fire Book #11)
- Wings of Fire: The Hive Queen (December 26, 2018, Wings of Fire Book #12)
- Wings of Fire: The Poison Jungle (July 30, 2019, Wings of Fire Book #13)
- Wings of Fire: The Dangerous Gift (March 2, 2021, Wings of Fire Book #14)
- Wings of Fire: The Flames of Hope (April 5, 2022, Wings of Fire Book #15)
- Wings of Fire: The Hybrid Prince (March 3, 2026, Wings of Fire Book #16)

==== Wings of Fire: Winglets ====
- Wings of Fire: Winglets #1 - Prisoners (March 31, 2015, Wings of Fire Short Story #1)
- Wings of Fire: Winglets #2 - Assassin (September 29, 2015, Wings of Fire Short Story #2)
- Wings of Fire: Winglets #3 - Deserter (March 29, 2016, Wings of Fire Short Story #3)
- Wings of Fire: Winglets #4 - Runaway (September 27, 2016, Wings of Fire Short Story #4)
- Wings of Fire - A Winglets Collection: The First Three Stories (September 1, 2016, Wings of Fire Compilation of Prisoners, Assassin and Deserter; Limited Print)
- Wings of Fire: The Winglets Flip Book (April 27, 2019, Wings of Fire Compilation of Assassin and Deserter; Limited Print)
- Wings of Fire: The Winglets Quartet - The First Four Stories (October 6, 2020, Wings of Fire Compilation of Prisoners, Assassin, Deserter and Runaway)
- Wings of Fire: Winglets #5 - Hero (February 3, 2026, Wings of Fire Short Story #5)

==== Wings of Fire: Legends ====
- Wings of Fire: Legends - Darkstalker (June 28, 2016, Wings of Fire Legends Special Edition #1)
- Wings of Fire: Legends - Dragonslayer (March 3, 2020, Wings of Fire Legends Special Edition #2)

==== Wings of Fire - The Graphic Novel ====
- Wings of Fire - The Graphic Novel: The Dragonet Prophecy (January 2, 2018, with Mike Holmes, Wings of Fire Graphic Novel #1)
- Wings of Fire - The Graphic Novel: The Lost Heir (February 26, 2019, with Mike Holmes, Wings of Fire Graphic Novel #2)
- Wings of Fire - The Graphic Novel: The Hidden Kingdom (October 15, 2019, with Mike Holmes, Wings of Fire Graphic Novel #3)
- Wings of Fire - The Graphic Novel: The Dark Secret (December 29, 2020, with Mike Holmes, Wings of Fire Graphic Novel #4)
- Wings of Fire - The Graphic Novel: The Brightest Night (December 28, 2021, with Mike Holmes, Wings of Fire Graphic Novel #5)
- Wings of Fire - The Graphic Novel: Moon Rising (December 27, 2022, with Mike Holmes, Wings of Fire Graphic Novel #6)
- Wings of Fire - The Graphic Novel: Winter Turning (December 26, 2023, with Mike Holmes, Wings of Fire Graphic Novel #7)
- Wings of Fire - The Graphic Novel: Escaping Peril (December 24, 2024, with Mike Holmes, Wings of Fire Graphic Novel #8)
- Wings of Fire - The Graphic Novel: Talons of Power (December 30, 2025, with Mike Holmes, Wings of Fire Graphic Novel #9)

==== Wings of Fire (Spin-offs and Tie-ins) ====
- Wings of Fire: Forge Your Dragon World (May 4, 2021, with Mike Holmes, Wings of Fire Activity Book)
- Wings of Fire: The Official Coloring Book (April 5, 2022, with Brianna C. Walsh, Wings of Fire Activity Book)
- Wings of Fire: A Guide to the Dragon World (October 3, 2023, Wings of Fire Companion Book)
- Wings of Fire: How to Draw (November 7, 2023, with Brianna C. Walsh, Wings of Fire Activity Book)
- The Official Wings of Fire Stained Glass Art Book (February 4, 2025, Wings of Fire Activity Book)
- The Official Wings of Fire Stickerpedia (March 3, 2026, with Brianna C. Walsh, Wings of Fire Activity Book)

Note: All books credited under the name Tui T. Sutherland unless otherwise stated.
