= The New York Times Manga Best Sellers of 2011 =

A total of 18 manga titles have made first appearances in 2011. As of the 33rd week, nine titles reached the top of the weekly list (in order of number of weeks at the top of the list, from highest to lowest): Naruto, 12 weeks; Black Bird, 4 weeks; Hetalia: Axis Powers, 4 weeks; Black Butler, 3 weeks; Rosario + Vampire: Season II, 3 weeks; Yu-Gi-Oh! GX, 3 weeks; Negima!, 2 weeks; Fullmetal Alchemist, 1 week; and Maximum Ride, 1 week.

Deb Aoki noted that while the second volume of Hetalia: Axis Powers debuted at the top of the Best Seller list, the series may be selling more than the charts indicate because The New York Times does not include sales from digital download sites such as comiXology and Zinio. Black Butler became the first title other than Naruto to have four different releases listed simultaneously on the rankings in week 5. Week 24 saw a high turnover from the previous week's list as nine new releases, all published by Viz Media, entered the rankings. The high turnover occurred again in week 28 when eight new releases entered the weekly list, with only Naruto and Vampire Knight remaining from the previous week.

| Week | Sales rank^{[Legend]} | | | | | | | | | | Refs. |
| Week | 1 | 2 | 3 | 4 | 5 | 6 | 7 | 8 | 9 | 10 | Refs. |
|---|---|---|---|---|---|---|---|---|---|---|---|
| 1 | Hetalia: Axis Powers, vol. 2 | Vampire Knight, vol. 11 | Black Butler, vol. 3 | Ouran High School Host Club, vol. 15 | Naruto, vol. 49 | Hetalia: Axis Powers, vol. 1 | Bleach, vol. 33 | Alice in the Country of Hearts, vol. 5 | Yotsuba&!, vol. 9 | Rosario + Vampire: Season II, vol. 3 | |
| 2 | Hetalia: Axis Powers, vol. 2 | Vampire Knight, vol. 11 | Naruto, vol. 49 | Yotsuba&!, vol. 9 | Rosario + Vampire: Season II, vol. 3 | Claymore, vol. 17 | Black Butler, vol. 3 | Bleach, vol. 33 | Dengeki Daisy, vol. 3 | Hetalia: Axis Powers, vol. 1 | |
| 3 | Hetalia: Axis Powers, vol. 2 | Vampire Knight, vol. 11 | Naruto, vol. 49 | Hetalia: Axis Powers, vol. 1 | Black Butler, vol. 3 | Rosario + Vampire: Season II, vol. 3 | Black Butler, vol. 3 | Stepping on Roses, vol. 4 | Dengeki Daisy, vol. 3 | Yotsuba&!, vol. 9 | |
| 4 | Fullmetal Alchemist, vol. 24 | Hetalia: Axis Powers, vol. 2 | Vampire Knight, vol. 11 | Naruto, vol. 49 | Hetalia: Axis Powers, vol. 1 | Black Butler, vol. 1 | Rosario + Vampire: Season II, vol. 3 | Yotsuba&!, vol. 9 | Bleach, vol. 33 | Black Butler, vol. 3 | |
| 5 | Hetalia: Axis Powers, vol. 2 | Black Butler, vol. 4 | Vampire Knight, vol. 11 | Naruto, vol. 49 | Fullmetal Alchemist, vol. 24 | Hetalia: Axis Powers, vol. 1 | Black Butler, vol. 3 | Black Butler, vol. 1 | Black Butler, vol. 2 | Ouran High School Host Club, vol. 15 | |
| 6 | Naruto, vol. 50 | Black Bird, vol. 7 | Bakuman, vol. 3 | Hetalia: Axis Powers, vol. 2 | Black Butler, vol. 4 | Fullmetal Alchemist, vol. 24 | Naruto, vol. 49 | Vampire Knight, vol. 11 | Hetalia: Axis Powers, vol. 1 | D.Gray-man, vol. 20 | |
| 7 | Naruto, vol. 50 | Black Bird, vol. 7 | Black Butler, vol. 4 | Bakuman, vol. 3 | Fullmetal Alchemist, vol. 24 | Hetalia: Axis Powers, vol. 2 | D.Gray-man, vol. 20 | Vampire Knight, vol. 11 | Hetalia: Axis Powers, vol. 1 | One Piece, vol. 56 | |
| 8 | Naruto, vol. 50 | Black Butler, vol. 4 | Black Bird, vol. 7 | Fullmetal Alchemist, vol. 24 | Bakuman, vol. 3 | Hetalia: Axis Powers, vol. 2 | D.Gray-man, vol. 20 | Pandora Hearts, vol. 4 | Naruto, vol. 49 | Vampire Knight, vol. 11 | |
| 9 | Naruto, vol. 50 | Soul Eater, vol. 5 | Black Butler, vol. 4 | Fullmetal Alchemist, vol. 24 | Black Bird, vol. 7 | Vampire Knight, vol. 11 | Hetalia: Axis Powers, vol. 2 | Pandora Hearts, vol. 4 | Hetalia: Axis Powers, vol. 1 | Black Butler, vol. 1 | |
| 10 | Yu-Gi-Oh! GX, vol. 6 | Bleach, vol. 34 | Naruto, vol. 50 | Black Butler, vol. 4 | Soul Eater, vol. 5 | Black Bird, vol. 7 | Fullmetal Alchemist, vol. 24 | Library Wars, vol. 4 | Vampire Knight, vol. 11 | Death Note, vol. 2 (Black Edition) | |
| 11 | Naruto, vol. 50 | Bleach, vol. 34 | Yu-Gi-Oh! GX, vol. 6 | Soul Eater, vol. 5 | Black Butler, vol. 4 | Black Bird, vol. 7 | Dogs: Bullets & Carnage, vol. 5 | Rin-ne, vol. 5 | Black Butler, vol. 1 | Hetalia: Axis Powers, vol. 2 | |
| 12 | Naruto, vol. 50 | Yu-Gi-Oh! GX, vol. 6 | Bleach, vol. 34 | Black Butler, vol. 4 | Soul Eater, vol. 5 | Black Bird, vol. 7 | Hetalia: Axis Powers, vol. 2 | Death Note, vol. 1 (Black Edition) | Dogs: Bullets & Carnage, vol. 5 | Black Butler, vol. 1 | |
| 13 | Naruto, vol. 50 | Yu-Gi-Oh! GX, vol. 6 | Bleach, vol. 34 | Black Butler, vol. 4 | Soul Eater, vol. 5 | Black Bird, vol. 7 | Maximum Ride, vol. 1 | Black Butler, vol. 1 | Hetalia: Axis Powers, vol. 2 | Death Note, vol. 1 (Black Edition) | |
| 14 | Naruto, vol. 50 | Black Butler, vol. 4 | Yu-Gi-Oh! GX, vol. 6 | Bleach, vol. 34 | Black Bird, vol. 7 | Soul Eater, vol. 5 | Death Note, vol. 1 (Black Edition) | Black Butler, vol. 1 | K-On!, vol. 2 | Hetalia: Axis Powers, vol. 2 | |
| 15 | Rosario + Vampire: Season II, vol. 4 | Skip Beat!, vol. 23 | Blue Exorcist, vol. 1 | Dengeki Daisy, vol. 4 | Naruto, vol. 50 | Stepping on Roses, vol. 5 | Sakura Hime, vol. 1 | Nura, vol. 2 | Yu-Gi-Oh! GX, vol. 6 | Black Butler, vol. 4 | |
| 16 | Rosario + Vampire: Season II, vol. 4 | Akira, vol. 6 | Blue Exorcist, vol. 1 | Finder Series, vol. 3 | Naruto, vol. 50 | Skip Beat!, vol. 23 | Dengeki Daisy, vol. 4 | Black Butler, vol. 4 | Case Closed, vol. 38 | Sakura Hime, vol. 1 | |
| 17 | Rosario + Vampire: Season II, vol. 4 | Blue Exorcist, vol. 1 | Naruto, vol. 50 | Black Butler, vol. 4 | Dengeki Daisy, vol. 4 | Skip Beat!, vol. 23 | Akira, vol. 6 | K-On!, vol. 2 | Hetalia: Axis Powers, vol. 2 | Sakura Hime, vol. 1 | |
| 18 | Black Butler, vol. 5 | Maximum Ride, vol. 4 | Rosario + Vampire: Season II, vol. 4 | Highschool of the Dead, vol. 2 | Blue Exorcist, vol. 1 | Pandora Hearts, vol. 5 | Omamori Himari, vol. 3 | Naruto, vol. 50 | Higurashi When They Cry, Eye Opening Arc vol. 2 | Black Butler, vol. 4 | |
| 19 | Black Bird, vol. 8 | Maximum Ride, vol. 4 | Black Butler, vol. 5 | Bakuman, vol. 4 | Blue Exorcist, vol. 1 | Otomen, vol. 10 | Pandora Hearts, vol. 5 | Kimi ni Todoke, vol. 8 | Rosario + Vampire: Season II, vol. 4 | Highschool of the Dead, vol. 2 | |
| 20 | Black Bird, vol. 8 | Maximum Ride, vol. 4 | Black Butler, vol. 5 | Bakuman, vol. 4 | Blue Exorcist, vol. 1 | Rosario + Vampire: Season II, vol. 4 | Pandora Hearts, vol. 5 | Highschool of the Dead, vol. 2 | Otomen, vol. 10 | Ai Ore, vol. 1 | |
| 21 | Negima!, vol. 29 | Black Bird, vol. 8 | Maximum Ride, vol. 4 | Black Butler, vol. 5 | Blue Exorcist, vol. 1 | Shugo Chara!, vol. 10 | Fairy Tail, vol. 13 | Biomega, vol. 6 | Rosario + Vampire: Season II, vol. 4 | Bakuman, vol. 4 | |
| 22 | Negima!, vol. 29 | Maximum Ride, vol. 4 | Black Bird, vol. 8 | Black Butler, vol. 5 | Shugo Chara!, vol. 10 | Fairy Tail, vol. 13 | Blue Exorcist, vol. 1 | Rosario + Vampire: Season II, vol. 4 | Arisa, vol. 2 | Bakuman, vol. 4 | |
| 23 | Maximum Ride, vol. 4 | Black Bird, vol. 8 | Negima!, vol. 29 | Spice and Wolf, vol. 4 | Black Butler, vol. 5 | Blue Exorcist, vol. 1 | Black Butler, vol. 1 | Rosario + Vampire: Season II, vol. 4 | Pandora Hearts, vol. 5 | The Melancholy of Suzumiya Haruhi-chan, vol. 2 | |
| 24 | Naruto, vol. 51 | Vampire Knight, vol. 12 | Bleach, vol. 35 | Fullmetal Alchemist, vol. 25 | Ouran High School Host Club, vol. 16 | Blue Exorcist, vol. 2 | Bakuman, vol. 5 | One Piece, vol. 57 | Maximum Ride, vol. 4 | Claymore, vol. 18 | |
| 25 | Naruto, vol. 51 | Vampire Knight, vol. 12 | Fullmetal Alchemist, vol. 25 | Ouran High School Host Club, vol. 16 | Bleach, vol. 35 | Blue Exorcist, vol. 2 | Maximum Ride, vol. 4 | Bakuman, vol. 5 | One Piece, vol. 57 | Black Bird, vol. 8 | |
| 26 | Naruto, vol. 51 | Vampire Knight, vol. 12 | Fullmetal Alchemist, vol. 25 | Ouran High School Host Club, vol. 16 | Blue Exorcist, vol. 2 | Bleach, vol. 35 | Bakuman, vol. 5 | Maximum Ride, vol. 4 | One Piece, vol. 57 | Blue Exorcist, vol. 1 | |
| 27 | Naruto, vol. 51 | Vampire Knight, vol. 12 | Soul Eater, vol. 6 | Fullmetal Alchemist, vol. 25 | Ouran High School Host Club, vol. 16 | Bleach, vol. 35 | Blue Exorcist, vol. 2 | Blue Exorcist, vol. 1 | Maximum Ride, vol. 4 | Black Bird, vol. 8 | |
| 28 | Black Bird, vol. 9 | Warriors: SkyClan and the Stranger, vol. 1 | Dance in the Vampire Bund, vol. 10 | Rosario + Vampire: Season II, vol. 5 | Yu-Gi-Oh! 5D's, vol. 1 | Naruto, vol. 51 | Skip Beat!, vol. 24 | Dengeki Daisy, vol. 5 | Toradora!, vol. 2 | Vampire Knight, vol. 12 | |
| 29 | Black Bird, vol. 9 | Rosario + Vampire: Season II, vol. 5 | Naruto, vol. 51 | Yu-Gi-Oh! 5D's, vol. 1 | Vampire Knight, vol. 12 | Skip Beat!, vol. 24 | Soul Eater, vol. 6 | Dengeki Daisy, vol. 5 | Shugo Chara!, vol. 11 | Dance in the Vampire Bund, vol. 10 | |
| 30 | Black Butler, vol. 6 | Negima!, vol. 30 | Naruto, vol. 51 | Black Bird, vol. 9 | Vampire Knight, vol. 12 | Rosario + Vampire: Season II, vol. 5 | Pandora Hearts, vol. 6 | Yu-Gi-Oh! 5D's, vol. 1 | Soul Eater, vol. 6 | Shugo Chara!, vol. 11 | |
| 31 | Black Butler, vol. 6 | Naruto, vol. 51 | Negima!, vol. 30 | Black Bird, vol. 9 | Vampire Knight, vol. 12 | Yu-Gi-Oh! 5D's, vol. 1 | Pandora Hearts, vol. 6 | Shugo Chara!, vol. 11 | Blue Exorcist, vol. 1 | I Am Here!, vol. 2 | |
| 32 | Yu-Gi-Oh! GX, vol. 7 | Blue Exorcist, vol. 3 | Bakuman, vol. 6 | Fullmetal Alchemist, vol. 2 (3-in-1 Edition) | Black Butler, vol. 6 | Sakura Hime, vol. 3 | Ai Ore, vol. 2 | Otomen, vol. 11 | Naruto, vol. 51 | Pokémon Adventures, vol. 14 | |
| 33 | Yu-Gi-Oh! GX, vol. 7 | Blue Exorcist, vol. 3 | Bakuman, vol. 6 | Ai Ore, vol. 2 | Fullmetal Alchemist, vol. 2 (3-in-1 Edition) | Naruto, vol. 47 | Bleach, vol. 2 (3-in-1 Edition) | I Am Here!, vol. 2 | Sakura Hime, vol. 3 | Otomen, vol. 11 | |
| 34 | Yu-Gi-Oh! GX, vol. 7 | Blue Exorcist, vol. 3 | Bakuman, vol. 6 | Bleach, vol. 2 (3-in-1 Edition) | Fullmetal Alchemist, vol. 2 (3-in-1 Edition) | Ai Ore, vol. 2 | Sakura Hime, vol. 3 | Black Bird, vol. 5 | Naruto, vol. 48 | Naruto, vol. 1 (3-in-1 Edition) | |
| 35 | Yu-Gi-Oh! GX, vol. 7 | Blue Exorcist, vol. 3 | Fullmetal Alchemist, vol. 2 (3-in-1 Edition) | Bakuman, vol. 6 | Naruto, vol. 49 | Bleach, vol. 2 (3-in-1 Edition) | Karakuridoji Ultimo, vol. 1 | K-On, vol. 3 | Negima! Magister Negi Magi, vol. 1 (3-in-1 edition) | Naruto, vol. 47 | |
| 36 | Amulet: The Last Council, vol. 4 | Karakuridoji Ultimo, vol. 1 | Yu-Gi-Oh! GX, vol. 7 | Naruto, vol. 49 | Fullmetal Alchemist, vol. 2 (3-in-1 Edition) | Negima! Magister Negi Magi, vol. 1 (3-in-1 edition) | Kannagi, vol. 1 | Blue Exorcist, vol. 3 | Blue Exorcist, vol. 1 | Air Gear, vol. 19 | |
| 37 | Naruto, vol. 52 | Bleach, vol. 36 | Black Bird, vol. 10 | Dengeki Daisy, vol. 6 | Kimi ni Todoke: From Me to You, vol. 10 | Library Wars: Love and War, vol. 6 | Blue Exorcist, vol. 1 | Butterflies, Flowers, vol. 8 | Ultimo, vol. 6 | Death Note Black Edition, vol. 5 | |
| 38 | Sailor Moon, vol. 1 (new printing) | Codename: Sailor V, vol. 1 | XXXholic, vol. 17 | Bleach, vol. 36 | Naruto, vol. 52 | Black Bird, vol. 10 | One Piece, vol. 58 | Shugo Chara!, vol. 12 | Ultimo, vol. 6 | Dengeki Daisy, vol. 6 | |
| 39 | Sailor Moon, vol. 1 (new printing) | Codename: Sailor V, vol. 1 | Negima!, vol. 31 | Fullmetal Alchemist, vol. 26 | Naruto, vol. 52 | One Piece, vol. 58 | Black Bird, vol. 10 | Bleach, vol. 36 | Witch and Wizard, vol. 1 | Pokemon: Black and White, vol. 3 | |
| 40 | Sailor Moon, vol. 1 (new printing) | A Certain Scientific Railgun, vol. 2 | Codename: Sailor V, vol. 1 | Negima!, vol. 31 | Fullmetal Alchemist, vol. 26 | Naruto, vol. 52 | XXXholic, vol. 17 | Black Bird, vol. 10 | Bleach, vol. 36 | Vampire Kisses: Graveyard Games, vol. 1 | |
| 41 | Vampire Knight, vol. 13 | Rosario+Vampire: Season II, vol. 6 | Bakuman, vol. 7 | Pokemon Adventures: Diamond and Pearl/Platinum, vol. 3 | Blue Exorcist, vol. 4 | Fairy Tail, vol. 15 | Book of Human Insects | Ninja Girls, vol. 7 | Psyren, vol. 1 | Sailor Moon, vol. 1 (new printing) | |
| 42 | Rosario+Vampire: Season II, vol. 6 | Sailor Moon, vol. 1 (new printing) | Skip Beat, vol. 25 | Battle Angel Alita: Last Order, vol. 15 | Vampire Knight, vol. 13 | Blue Exorcist, vol. 4 | 20th Century Boys, vol. 17 | Codename: Sailor V, vol. 1 | Kamisama Kiss, vol. 5 | Negima!, vol. 31 | |
| 43 | , vol. | , vol. | , vol. | , vol. | , vol. | , vol. | , vol. | , vol. | , vol. | , vol. | |
| 44 | , vol. | , vol. | , vol. | , vol. | , vol. | , vol. | , vol. | , vol. | , vol. | , vol. | |
| 45 | , vol. | , vol. | , vol. | , vol. | , vol. | , vol. | , vol. | , vol. | , vol. | , vol. | |
| 46 | , vol. | , vol. | , vol. | , vol. | , vol. | , vol. | , vol. | , vol. | , vol. | , vol. | |
| 46 | , vol. | , vol. | , vol. | , vol. | , vol. | , vol. | , vol. | , vol. | , vol. | , vol. | |
| 47 | , vol. | , vol. | , vol. | , vol. | , vol. | , vol. | , vol. | , vol. | , vol. | , vol. | |
| 48 | , vol. | , vol. | , vol. | , vol. | , vol. | , vol. | , vol. | , vol. | , vol. | , vol. | |
| 49 | Naruto Vol. 53 | Bleach Vol. 37 | One Piece Vol. 59 | Bakuman Vol. 8 | Blue Exorcist Vol. | Ouran High School Host Club Vol. 17 | Ghost in the Shell: Stand Alone Complex Vol. 2 | Black Jack Vol.17 | Dawn of the Arcana Vol. 1 | Shugo Chara!-chan! Vol. 1 | |

Weeks are numbered according to the convention used in the United States, which labels the week containing January 1 as the first week of the year.

First appearance of a manga series title on the Best Seller list

First appearance of an individual manga release on the Best Seller list

^{FB} Fan book release

^{LN} Light novel release
