= List of Bakuman chapters =

Cover of the first tankōbon released by Shueisha on January 5, 2009, featuring Moritaka Mashiro.

The chapters of Bakuman, a Japanese manga series, are written by Tsugumi Ohba and illustrated by Takeshi Obata. Bakuman has been serialized in the shōnen manga magazine Weekly Shōnen Jump by Shueisha since its premiere on August 11, 2008. The series follows accomplished artist Moritaka Mashiro and aspiring writer Akito Takagi, two boys in ninth grade who wish to be manga creators.

Since its premiere, more than one hundred chapters have been released in Japan. The individual tankōbon are released by Shueisha. The first volume of Bakuman was released on January 5, 2009, and the series has currently finished in Japan with the twentieth and final volume released in July 2012.

The chapters were also released for a limited time in English, German and French on the Jumpland Manga Online website starting on August 19, 2008, and were available until August 31, 2009. Bakuman is the first manga released online by Shueisha in multiple languages before becoming available in print outside Japan. The series has also been released in Korea by Daiwon C.I. and serialized in their Comic Champ manhwa magazine. The series is available in North America from Viz Media.

== Volume list ==
No.	Title	Original release date	English release date
1	Dreams and Reality; Yume to Genjitsu (夢と現実)	January 5, 2009; 978-4-08-874622-7	August 3, 2010; 978-1-4215-3513-5
1. "Dreams and Reality" (夢と現実, Yume to Genjitsu); 2. "Dumb and Smart" (馬鹿と利口, Baka to Rikō); 3. "Pen and Storyboard" (ペンとネーム, Pen to Nēmu); 4. "Parent and Child" (親と子, Oya to Ko); 5. "Time and Key" (時と鍵, Toki to Kagi); 6. "Top and Bottom" (ピンとキリ, Pin to Kiri); 7. "Smile and Bashful" (笑顔と赤面症, Egao to Sekimenshō)
2	Chocolate and Akamaru; Choko to Akamaru (チョコと赤マル)	March 4, 2009; 978-4-08-874644-9	November 2, 2010; 978-1-4215-3514-2
8. "Carrot and Stick" (アメとムチ, Ame to Muchi); 9. "A Condition and Going to Tokyo" (条件と上京, Jōken to Jōkyō; lit. 'Conditions and Moving to Tokyo'); 10. "Fear and Hope" (不安と期待, Fuan to Kitai); 11. "Regret and Satisfaction" (後悔と納得, Kōkai to Nattoku); 12. "10 and 2" (10と2, Jū to Ni); 13. "Chocolate and Akamaru" (チョコと赤マル, Choko to Akamaru); 14. "Feast and Graduation" (御馳走と卒業, Gochisō to Sotsugyō); 15. "Send and Reply" (送信と返信, Sōshin to Henshin); 16. "Early Results and Final Report" (速報と本ちゃん, Sokuhō to Honchan)
At the Shonen Jump offices, editor Akira Hattori tells Mashiro and Takagi that their work is "bronze-level" but looks forward to their next creation. A seating arrangement pairs Mashiro with Azuki, as he quietly shares his feelings. After their work misses the Tezuka award short list, Mashiro and Takagi work on The Hundred Millionth, which does make the list but not enough to place for an award. Meanwhile, Eiji Nizuma, the 15-year-old winner, is invited to move to Tokyo. Takagi must also choose between Iwase and Miyoshi for his girlfriend. After Hattori reviews the evaluation for The Hundred Millionth with the guys, Sasaki, the editor-in-chief (and Mashiro's uncle's former editor) encourages them. Under Hattori's advice that they make a cult hit, Mashiro and Takagi work on The World is Made of Money and Intelligence for the Akamaru Jump publication, whose viability thrives on reader surveys. As they graduate from high school, Miyoshi tells the guys that Azuki is moving out of the region for high school, prompting Mashiro to reaffirm their promise to be together. The World finishes in third place in the surveys, the guys start anew to make a more mainstream manga.
3	Debut and Impatience; Debyū to Aseri (デビューと焦り)	June 4, 2009; 978-4-08-874677-7	February 1, 2011; 978-1-4215-3515-9
17. "Battle and Copy" (バトルと模写, Batoru to Mosha); 18. "Rival and Friend" (ライバルと友達, Raibaru to Tomodachi); 19. "Debut and Impatience" (デビューと焦り, Debyū to Aseri); 20. "Future and Stairway" (未来と階段, Mirai to Kaidan); 21. "Wall and Kiss" (壁とキス, Kabe to Kisu); 22. "In the Way and Youth" (邪魔と若さ, Jama to Wakasa); 23. "Conceit and Kindness" (天狗と親切, Tengu to Shinsetsu); 24. "Note and Character" (ノートとキャラ, Nōto to Kyara); 25. "Jealousy and Love" (嫉妬と愛, Shitto to Ai)
Mashiro practices drawing popular battle manga. While Mashiro and Takagi work out a deal to get serialized if their mainstream manga ranks high, Nizuma surprises his editor by drawing Crow instead of Yellow Hit. Mashiro, Takagai and Nizuma meet each other at Jump's editor office. Mashiro and Takagi try a shonen battle series called My Angel and submit it for the Gold Future Cup, but it is rejected by the other editors. Azuki lands a small part in an anime show, and Miyoshi announces she wants to be a cell phone novelist. When Mashiro notices Takagi is spending more time with Miyoshi, he accepts a job assisting Nizuma, where he meets aspiring manga artist Shinta Fukuda and veteran assistant Takuro Nakai. Mashiro and Fukuda give advice to Nizuma on improving his chapter and how to make use of storyboards and editor meetings. After working two days, Mashiro quits when he is inspired to dig up his old sketchbooks of characters, and finds a character suitable for a mystery. While Takagi and Miyoshi spend time together on her cell phone novel, Mashiro gets impatient over waiting for Takagi's storyboard.
4	Phone Call and The Night Before; Denwa to Zen'ya (電話と前夜)	August 4, 2009; 978-4-08-874719-4	April 19, 2011; 978-1-4215-3793-1
26. "Two and One" (2人と1人, Futari to Hitori); 27. "Schemer and Deceit" (策士と騙し, Sakushi to Damashi); 28. "Cooperation and Condition" (協力と条件, Kyōryoku to Jōken); 29. "Literature and Music" (文学と音楽, Bungaku to Ongaku); 30. "Coalition and Disagreement" (団結と決裂, Danketsu to Ketsuretsu); 31. "Tuesday and Friday" (火曜と金曜, Kayō to Kin'yō); 32. "Phone Call and The Night Before" (電話と前夜, Denwa to Zen'ya); 33. "Yay and Nay" (ありとなし, Ari to Nashi); 34. "The Pursuer and the Pursued" (追う者と追われる者, Ou Mono to Owareru Mono)
With Takagi's storyboards not done, Mashiro and Takagi agree to part ways, with Mashiro focusing on making his own. However, both end up trying to make a mystery-themed storyboard, and while Hattori tries to keep them independently working, a month later Mashiro discovers they have the same idea, and collaborate to make eight chapters of storyboards in five months. Hattori enters them into the Gold Future Cup, which uses an approval voting scheme, and has them do a new chapter final draft every two weeks. Mashiro and Takagi meet Ko Aoki, a female manga artist who is a finalist in the Cup. When finalist Koji Makaino publicizes his celebrity status as the musician "Koogy" to garner votes, the others complain to the editor office, but decide they will try to beat him by making their own manga better. Fukuda and Ashirogi's titles are both declared winners, with Aoki's not far behind. Following an extensive serialization meeting, Mashiro and Takagi learn their title, Detective Trap, will be serialized. Azuki struggles with whether to do a gravure idol photobook.
5	Yearbook and Photobook; Bunshū to Shashinshū (文集と写真集)	November 4, 2009; 978-4-08-874753-8	June 7, 2011; 978-1-4215-3794-8
35. "Happiness and Sadness" (嬉しさと寂しさ, Ureshisa to Sabishisa); 36. "Silence and Party" (沈黙と宴, Chinmoku to Utage); 37. "Executive Director and Songbird (取締役とトリ, Torishimariyaku to Tori); 38. "Window and Snow" (窓と雪, Mado to Yuki); 39. "Yearbook and Photobook" (文集と写真集, Bunshū to Shashinshū); 40. "Beach and Ups and Downs" (海と浮き沈み, Umi to Ukishizumi); 41. "Pandering and Patience" (テコと我慢, Teko to Gaman); 42. "Humor and Dialogue" (笑いとセリフ, Warai to Serifu); 43. "Jokes and News" (ボケとニュース, Boke to Nyūsu)
Mashiro and Takagi are assigned a new editor, Goro Miura, and three assistants: Ogawa, Kato, and Takahama. Mashiro and Takagi attend Jump's corporate party where they meet Kazuya Hiramaru, a former office worker who regrets that the manga artist lifestyle is so demanding. When Koogy announces that he is partnering with Aoki in Jump Square, Nakai desperately draws storyboards outside her apartment in the cold to win her back. As the rankings for Detective Trap fall into the middle of the pack, Mashiro and Takagi ponder changing the story. Miho and Mashiro agree to have Miho turn down the gravure photo shoot. Miura tells Mashiro and Takagi not to change the story, despite the serialization debuts of Fukuda and Aoki, and suggests they lighten it up by adding some comic elements. The advice helps as Detective Trap climbs in the rankings and they end up tied with Niizuma for third place.
6	Reckless and Guts; Mucha to Konjō (無茶と根性)	January 4, 2010; 978-4-08-874788-0	August 2, 2011; 978-1-4215-3824-2
44. "Returning Favors and Opposite" (恩返しと裏返し, Ongaeshi to Uragaeshi); 45. "Disease and Drive" (病気とやる気, Byōki to Yaruki); 46. "Eyes Power and Cooperation" (目力と協力, Mejikara to Kyōryoku); 47. "Contradiction and Reason" (矛盾と理由, Mujun to Riyū); 48. "Life-and-Death and Standstill" (生死と静止, Seishi to Seishi); 49. "Recall and Call" (リコールとコール, Rikōru to Kōru); 50. "Reckless and Guts" (無茶と根性, Mucha to Konjō); 51. "Resumption and Low Rank" (再開と下位, Saikai to Kai); 52. "Impressions and Dash" (感想と疾走, Kansō to Shissō)
Mashiro and Takagi prepare their first tankōbon volume and color prints. Mashiro collapses from a weakened liver and is hospitalized. Against his doctor's recommendations, Mashiro continues working. Miho tries to talk him out of it, revealing that she has liked him since their fourth grade, but he persists, so she decides to support him. When Sasaki puts the series on hiatus, Niizuma, Fukuda, Aiko / Sakai and Tanamaru go on strike, but the Jump editors negotiate for them to resume when Mashiro is released from hospital, although Sasaki still wants to enforce Ashirogi's hiatus until April. When Mashiro gets out, he produces his storyboards and convinces Sasaki to resume running. New competition from a mystery-themed novelist's one-shot puts Detective Trap near the bottom of the polls, causing Mashiro and Takagi to try desperate measures.
7	Gag and Serious; Gyagu to Shiriasu (ギャグとシリアス)	March 4, 2010; 978-4-08-870015-1	October 4, 2011; 978-1-4215-3888-4
53. "18 and 40" (18と40, Jūhachi to Yonjū); 54. "Gag and Serious" (ギャグとシリアス, Gyagu to Shiriasu); 55. "Three Illustrations and Three Stories" (3カットと3作, Sankatto to Sansaku); 56. "Adult and Child" (大人と子供, Otona to Kodomo); 57. "Assignment and Standoff" (フリワケと引き分け, Furiwake to Hikiwake); 58. "Single and Double Digits" (一桁と二桁, Hitoketa to Futaketa); 59. "Experience and Data" (経験とデータ, Keiken to Dēta); 60. "Men and Women" (男性と女性, Dansei to Josei); 61. "Alliance and Classmate" (同盟と同級, Dōmei to Dōkyū)
8	Panty Shot and Savior; Panchira to Kyūseishu (パンチラと救世主)	April 30, 2010; 978-4-08-870037-3	December 6, 2011; 978-1-4215-3889-1
62. "Novel and Letter" (小説と手紙, Shōsetsu to Tegami); 63. "Distrust and Trust" (不信と信用, Fushin to Shin'yō); 64. "Just So and Secret" (まんまと隠し事, Manma to Kakushigoto); 65. "Stubborn and Honest" (頑固と素直, Ganko to Sunao); 66. "Monkey and Marriage" (猿と結婚, Saru to Kekkon); 67. "Panty Shot and Savior" (パンチラと救世主, Panchira to Kyūseishu); 68. "Toilet and Bath" (トイレとお風呂, Toire to Ofuro); 69. "Relationship and Home" (特別な仲と田舎, Tokubetsu na Naka to Inaka); 70. "Third Try and Second Series" (三度目と2本目, Sandome to Nihonme)
9	Talent and Pride; Sainō to Puraido (才能とプライド)	August 4, 2010; 978-4-08-870088-5	February 7, 2012; 978-1-4215-3958-4
71. "Talent and Pride" (才能とプライド, Sainō to Puraido); 72. "Complaint and Declaration" (文句と一喝, Monku to Ikkatsu); 73. "Fate and Star" (縁と星, En to Hoshi); 74. "Classmate and Rivalry" (同級生と闘争心, Dōkyūsei to Tōsōshin); 75. "New Home and New Series" (新居と新連載, Shinkyo to Shinrensai); 76. "Catchphrase and Message" (決めギャグとメッセージ, Kime Gyagu to Messēji); 77. "Love and Denial" (大好きと否定, Daisuki to Hitei); 78. "To Quit and Not To Quit" (やめるとやめない, Yameru to Yamenai); 79. "Selfishness and Advice" (わがままとアドバイス, Wagamama to Adobaisu)
10	Imagination and Presentation; Hyōgenryoku to Sōzōryoku (表現力と想像力)	October 4, 2010; 978-4-08-870114-1	April 3, 2012; 978-1-4215-3995-9
80. "Appearance and Greetings" (見ためと挨拶, Mitame to Aisatsu); 81. "Adventure and Advance" (冒険と口説き, Bōken to Kudoki); 82. "Hint and Best" (ヒントとベスト, Hinto to Besuto); 83. "Spy and Next Work" (スパイと次回, Supai to Jikai); 84. "One-Piece and Surprise" (ワンピースとサプライズ, Wanpīsu to Sapuraizu); 85. "The Perfect Crime and First Hurdle" (完全犯罪と第一関門, Kanzen Hanzai to Daiichi Kanmon); 86. "Winning and Losing" (勝ちと負け, Kachi to Make); 87. "Cake and Formidable Enemies" (ケーキと強敵, Kēki to Kyōteki); 88. "Imagination and Presentation" (表現力と想像力, Hyōgenryoku to Sōzōryoku)
11	Title and Character Design; Taitoru to Kyaradeza (タイトルとキャラデザ)	December 29, 2010; 978-4-08-870164-6	June 5, 2012; 978-1-4215-4103-7
89. "Title and Character Design" (タイトルとキャラデザ, Taitoru to Kyaradeza); 90. "Art and Product" (芸術と商品, Geijutsu to Shōhin); 91. "Votes and Charts" (票と表, Hyō to Hyō); 92. "Disposition and Decision" (意地と決断, Iji to Ketsudan); 93. "Center and Strongest" (中央と最強, Chūō to Saikyō); 94. "Tea and Chiaroscuro" (お茶と明暗, Ocha to Meian); 95. "Every Night and Partnership" (毎晩と合体, Maiban to Gattai); 96. "4th Place Votes and Series" (4位票とシリーズ, Yon'i-hyō to Shirīzu); 97. "Last and Password" (ラストと暗号, Rasuto to Angō)
12	Artist and Manga Artist; Gaka to Mangaka (画家と漫画家)	March 04, 2011; 978-4-08-870191-2	July 3, 2012; 978-1-4215-4136-5
98. "Handshake and Adjustments" (握手と手直し, Akushu to Tenaoshi); 99. "Tears of Disappointment and Tears of Joy" (悔し涙と嬉し涙, Kuyashinamida to Ureshinamida); 100. "Margin and Trap" (余裕と落とし穴, Yoyū to Otoshiana); 101. "Complaints and Desire for Improvement (苦情と上昇志向, Kujō to Jōshōshikō); 102. "Artist and Manga Artist" (画家と漫画家, Gaka to Mangaka); 103. "Futility and a Challenge" (無駄と挑戦, Muda to Chōsen); 104. "Step and Watch" (ステップとウォッチ); 105. "Defects and Outlines" (不良品とアタリ, Furyōhin to Atari); 106. "Match and Fest" (試合と祭, Shiai to Matsuri)
13	Avid Readers and Love at First Sight; Aidokusha to Hitomebore (愛読者と一目惚れ)	June 03, 2011; 978-4-08-870236-0	August 7, 2012; 978-1-4215-4208-9
107. "Suitable Things and Favorite Things" (合ってるものと好きなもの, Atteru Mono to Suki na Mono); 108. "Avid Readers and Love at First Sight" (愛読者と一目惚れ, Aidokusha to Hitomebore); 109. "Romeo and One-Year Anniversary" (ロミオと一周年, Romio to Isshūnen); 110. "Together and Separate" (一緒と別々, Issho to Betsubestu); 111. "Interference and Trust" (口出しと信頼, Kochidashi to Shinrai); 112. "A Punch and a Single Stance" (パンチと一人立ち, Panchi to Hitoridachi); 113. "Weak Points and Dedication" (不得意と心掛け, Futokui to Kokorogake); 114. "Love's Path and Footbridge" (恋路と歩道橋, Koiji to Hodōkyō); 115. "Commemorative Photoshoot and Classroom" (記念撮影と教室, Kinen Satsuei to Kyōshitsu)
14	Psychological Warfare and Catchphrases; Shinrisen to Kimeserifu (心理戦と決め台詞)	August 04, 2011; 978-4-08-870273-5	September 4, 2012; 978-1-4215-4290-4
116. "Goals and Assessment" (狙いと評価, Nerai to Hyōka); 117. "Fan Letter and Blog" (FLとブログ, Fan Retā to Burogu); 118. "Back and Front" (裏と表, Ura to Omote); 119. "Overconfidence and Publicity" (過信と宣伝, Kashin to Senden); 120. "Internet and Faces" (ネットと顔, Netto to Kao); 121. "Confidence and Resolve" (自信と覚悟, Jishin to Kakugo); 122. "Psychological Warfare and Catchphrases" (心理戦と決め台詞, Shinrisen to Kimeserifu); 123. "Pizza and Tea" (ピザとお茶, Piza to Ocha); 124. "Examination and Provocation" (考察と挑発, Kōsatsu to Chōhatsu)
15	Encouragement and Feelings; Hagemi to Omoi (励みと想い)	October 4, 2011; 978-4-08-870294-0	October 2, 2012; 978-1-4215-4291-1
125. "Impatience and Comeback" (焦燥と逆転, Shōsō to Gyakuten); 126. "Analysis and Results" (分析と結果, Bunseki to Kekka); 127. "Hot Blood and Utter Defeat" (熱血と完敗, Nekketsu to Kanpai); 128. "Portraits and Jeering" (似顔絵とひやかし, Nigaoe to Hiyakashi); 129. "Youth and Destiny" (青春と末路, Seishun to Matsuro); 130. "Fever and Ashes" (熱と灰, Netsu to Hai); 131. "Copycat and Subconscious" (模倣と無意識, Mohō to Muishiki); 132. "Headstands and Reorganizing" (逆立ちと立て直し, Sakadachi to Tatenaoshi); 133. "Encouragement and Feelings" (励みと想い, Hagemi to Omoi)
16	Newcomers and Veterans; Shinjin to Beteran (新人とベテラン)	January 4, 2012; 978-4-08-870316-9	November 6, 2012; 978-1-4215-4292-8
134. "Running Solo and Slow Footedness" (独走と鈍足, Dokusō to Donsoku); 135. "Succession and Interference" (連続と阻止, Renzoku to Soshi); 136. "Extensions and Countermeasures" (伸びしろと対抗策, Nobishiro to Taikōsaku); 137. "Lead Color and Center Color" (巻頭カラーとセンターカラー, Kantō Karā to Sentā Karā); 138. "Power and Idea" (迫力とアイディア, Hakuryoku to Aidia); 139. "Final Chapter and Comments" (最終話とコメント, Saishūwa to Komento); 140. "Limits and Phoenix" (限界と火の鳥, Genkai to Hi no Tori); 141. "Age and Achievements" (年齢と実績, Nenrei to Jisseki); 142. "Newcomers and Veterans" (新人とベテラン, Shinjin to Beteran)
17	One-shot Deal and Complete Story; Ippatsu Shōbu to Ichiwa Kanketsu (一発勝負と一話完結)	March 2, 2012; 978-4-08-870389-3	December 4, 2012; 978-1-4215-4293-5
143. "Money and Recycling" (お金とリサイクル, Okane to Risaikuru); 144. "Company and Winning Strategy" (会社と必勝法, Kaisha to Hisshōhō); 145. "Offer and Interruption" (提供と停止, Teikyō to Teishi); 146. "Production and Gut Feelings" (本番と腹の虫, Honban to Hara no Mushi); 147. "Disposable and Fighting Spirit" (使い捨てと闘争心, Tsukaisute to Tōsōshin); 148. "One-shot Deal and Complete Story" (一発勝負と一話完結, Ippatsu Shōbu to Ichiwa Kanketsu); 149. "Characteristics and Subjects" (持ち味と題材, Mochiaji to Daizai); 150. "Selfishness and Partiality" (我儘と贔屓, Wagamama to Hiiki); 151. "Zombie and Devil" (ゾンビと悪魔, Zonbi to Akuma)
18	Margins and Hell; Yoyū to Shuraba (余裕と修羅場)	May 2, 2012; 978-4-08-870420-3	March 5, 2013; 978-1-4215-4294-2
152. "Synergistic Effect and New Record" (相乗効果と新記録, Sōjō Kōka to Shin-kiroku); 153. "World and Opponent" (世界と相手, Sekai to Aite); 154. "Weekly and Monthly" (週刊と月刊, Shūkan to Gekkan); 155. "Workplace and Notebook" (仕事場とノート, Shigoto-ba to Nōto); 156. "Margins and Hell" (余裕と修羅場, Yoyū to Shuraba); 157. "Antagonists and Switching" (敵キャラと入れ替え, Teki Kyara to Irekae); 158. "Drawn Out and In One Go" (間延びと一気, Manobi to Ikki); 159. "Tempo and Ferris Wheel" (テンポと観覧車, Tenpo to Kanransha); 160. "Perseverance and 900,000" (頑張りと90万, Ganbari to Kyūjūman)
19	Decision and Delight; Kettei to Kanki (決定と歓喜)	June 4, 2012; 978-4-08-870461-6	May 7, 2013; 978-1-4215-4295-9
161. "Breather and Party" (息継ぎとパーティー, Ikitsugi to Pātī); 162. "Hot Spring and Alternative" (温泉と二択, Onsen to Nitaku); 163. "Confirmation and Consent" (意思確認と承諾, Ishi Kakunin to Shōdaku); 164. "Decision and Delight" (決定と歓喜, Kettei to Kanki); 165. "During Practice and During Charging" (練習中と充電中, Renshū-chū to Jūden-chū); 166. "Rumors and Articles" (噂と記事, Uwasa to Kiji); 167. "Foolish Words and a Word" (戯言と一言, Tawagoto to Hitokoto); 168. "Correction and Declaration" (訂正と宣言, Teisei to Sengen)
20	Dreams and Reality; Yume to Genjitsu (夢と現実)	July 4, 2012; 978-4-08-870466-1	August 6, 2013; 978-1-4215-5370-2
169. "Voices and Responses" (声と反響, Koe to Hankyō); 170. "Publicity and Popularity" (知名度と人気, Chimeido to Ninki); 171. "Microphone and Script" (マイクと台本, Maiku to Daihon); 172. "Miho and Naho" (美保と菜保, Miho to Naho); 173. "Moment and Final Volume" (瞬間と最終巻, Shunkan to Saishū-kan); 174. "How It Should Be and How It Ends" (あり方と終わり方, Arikata to Owarikata); 175. "Release Date and the Night Before" (発売日と前夜, Hatsubai-bi to Zen'ya); 176. "Dreams and Reality" (夢と現実, Yume to Genjitsu)
