= List of Shugo Chara! volumes =

Japanese cover of the first Shugo Chara! manga volume featuring the series heroine Amu Hinamori

Shugo Chara! is a Japanese shōjo manga series created by the manga author duo, Peach-Pit. The story centers on elementary school girl Amu Hinamori, whose popular exterior, referred to as "cool and spicy" by her classmates, contrasts with her introverted personality. When Amu wishes for the courage to be reborn as her would-be self, she is surprised to find three colorful eggs the next morning, which hatch into three Guardian Characters: Ran, Miki, and Su.

In December 2005, Peach Pit announced that they were working on a new shōjo manga series called Shugo Chara! The first chapter was published in the February 2006 edition of Nakayoshi magazine and ran until the January 2010 edition. The first volume collection was then republished on July 6, 2006, by Nakayoshi's publisher Kodansha. In addition to the regular volumes, the series was released in limited editions in Japan, each of which included different cover art from the regular editions, metallic foil sleeves, and a set of postcards featuring Amu in various outfits and poses following the color theme of the dust jackets. Del Rey Manga announced that it acquired the English language rights to Shugo Chara! during MangaNEXT 2006 and released the first volume on March 27, 2007.

The series was put on hiatus along with two other series, Rozen Maiden and Zombie-Loan, in December 2008 due to a sudden illness and hospitalization of one of the authors. One month later, Peach-Pit announced that all three series will resume and thanked their fans for the support during the illness.

A sequel title, Shugo Chara! Encore!, was announced to begin in the April 2010 issue of Nakayoshi. Four chapters of Encore! were released in October 2010 as volume 12 of the manga.

== Volume list ==
=== Shugo Chara! ===
Note: Volume titles are from the Del Rey (then latter Kodansha USA) releases.

No.	Title	Original release date	English release date
01	Who Do You Want to Be?	July 6, 2006; 978-4-0636-4113-4	March 27, 2007; 978-0-345-49745-1
02	Friends in Need	January 6, 2007; 978-4-0636-4129-5	August 28, 2007; 978-0-345-49927-1
03	Can a Bad Guy Turn Good?	March 20, 2007; 978-4-0636-4139-4	February 12, 2008; 978-0-345-50146-2
04	Character Swap!	July 20, 2007; 978-4-0636-4156-1	May 20, 2008; 978-0-345-50522-4
05	The New Kids!	November 20, 2007; 978-4-0636-4167-7	December 30, 2008; 978-0-345-50804-1
06	Betrayal	March 19, 2008; 978-4-0636-4182-0	April 28, 2009; 978-0-345-51032-7
07	Black Cat	July 18, 2008; 978-4-0636-4192-9	September 29, 2009; 978-0-345-51430-1
08	With a Little Help From Their Friends	December 5, 2008; 978-4-0636-4204-9	January 26, 2010; 978-0-345-51431-8
09	A Big Discovery	June 5, 2009; 978-4-0636-4222-3	July 27, 2010; 978-0-345-52082-1
10	A Heart's Desire. . .	October 23, 2009; 978-4-06-364237-7	May 10, 2011; 978-1-935429-93-7
11	The Road to the Future	March 5, 2010; 978-4-06-364251-3	July 12, 2011; 978-1-935429-83-8
12	It's almost graduation	October 6, 2010; 978-4-06-364279-7	September 6, 2011; 978-1-935429-84-5

=== Shugo Chara-chan! ===
No.	Original release date	Original ISBN	English release date	English ISBN
01	December 5, 2008	978-4-06-375609-8	—	—
02	August 6, 2009	978-4-06-364231-5	—	—
03	April 3, 2010	978-4-06-364267-4	—	—
04	December 28, 2010	978-4-06-364289-6	—	—
