= List of Pandora Hearts chapters =

The cover of the first tankōbon volume, released by Square Enix on November 27, 2006

Pandora Hearts is a Japanese manga series written and illustrated by Jun Mochizuki. It was serialized in Square Enix monthly shōnen magazine GFantasy from June 2006 to March 2015. The serial chapters were collected into twenty-four tankōbon volumes. The first was released on October 27, 2006, and the last on June 27, 2015. In English, the series was first licensed by Broccoli Books, but has since been dropped. It was then licensed by Yen Press and began serialization in the June 2009 issue of Yen Plus, and followed-up by its first volume release on December 15, 2009. In Indonesia, the manga has been licensed by Elex Media Komputindo, and in France by Ki-oon.

The manga has been adapted into a 25 episodes anime series by Xebec, which have been broadcast on Tokyo Broadcasting System (TBS), BS-TBS, Chubu-Nippon Broadcasting (CBC), and Mainichi Broadcasting System (MBS). On February 11, 2010, NIS America announced it would release the anime of Pandora Hearts in North America.

== Volumes ==
No.	Original release date	Original ISBN	English release date	English ISBN
1	October 27, 2006	978-4-7575-1808-7	December 15, 2009	978-0-316-07607-4
Retrace I: "Innocent Calm"; Retrace II: "Tempest of Conviction"; Retrace III: "Prisoner&Alichino"; Retrace IV: "Rendezvous"
2	March 27, 2007	978-4-7575-1979-4	May 18, 2010	978-0-316-07608-1
Retrace V: "Clockwise Doom."; Retrace VI: "Where am I?"; Retrace VII: "Reunion"; Retrace VIII: "Whisperer"; Retrace IX: "Question"
3	July 27, 2007	978-4-7575-2062-2	October 26, 2010	978-0-316-07610-4
Retrace X: "Malediction"; Retrace XI: "Grim"; Retrace XII: "Where am I?"; Retrace XIII: "A Lost Raven"
4	December 27, 2007	978-4-7575-2193-3	January 25, 2011	978-0-316-07611-1
Retrace XIV: "Lop Ear"; Retrace XV: "Welcome to Labyrinth"; Retrace XVI: "Keeper of the secret"; Retrace XVII: "Odds and Ends"; Retrace XVIII: "Hollow eye socket"
5	April 26, 2008	978-4-7575-2272-5	April 26, 2011	978-0-316-07612-8
Retrace XIX: "Detestably"; Retrace XX: "Who killed poor Alice?"; Retrace XXI: "Discord"; Retrace XXII: "His name is..."
6	August 27, 2008	978-4-7575-2367-8	July 19, 2011	978-0-316-07615-9
Retrace XXIII: "Conflict"; Retrace XXIV: "Hello my sister!"; Retrace XXV: "Elliot&Leo"; Retrace XXVI: "The pool of Tears"
7	December 27, 2008	978-4-7575-2454-5	October 25, 2011	978-0-316-07616-6
Retrace XXVII: "Get out of the Pool"; Retrace XXVIII: "Modulation"; Retrace XXIX: "Rufus Barma"; Retrace XXX: "Snow White Chaos"
8	March 27, 2009	978-4-7575-2526-9	January 24, 2012	978-0-316-19725-0
Retrace XXXI: "Countervalue of Loss"; Retrace XXXII: "Snow Dome"; Retrace XXXIII: "Echo of Noise"; "Pandora Hearts One-Shot"
9	July 27, 2009	978-4-7575-2631-0	March 27, 2012	978-0-316-19727-4
Retrace XXXIV: "Noise of Echo"; Retrace XXXV: "Madness of Lost Memories"; Retrace XXXVI: "Sablier"; Retrace XXXVII: "Glen Baskerville"
10	November 27, 2009	978-4-7575-2735-5	May 29, 2012	978-0-316-19728-1
Retrace XXXVIII: "Scapegoat"; Retrace XXXIX: "Gate of Blackness"; Retrace XL: "Blindness"; Retrace XLI: "Where am I!?"
11	March 27, 2010	978-4-7575-2833-8	July 24, 2012	978-0-316-19729-8
Retrace XLII: "Stray"; Retrace XLIII: "Crown of Clown"; Retrace XLIV: "Dusty Sky"; Retrace XLV: "Queen of Hurts"
12	July 27, 2010	978-4-7575-2947-2	October 30, 2012	978-0-316-19731-1
Retrace XLVI: "Persona"; Retrace XLVII: "Unbirthday"; Retrace XLVIII: "Isla=Yura"; Retrace XLIX: "Night in gale"
13	November 27, 2010	978-4-7575-3077-5	December 11, 2012	978-0-316-19733-5
Retrace L: "Reverse Corte"; Retrace LI: "Lily&Reim"; Retrace LII: "Bloody Rites"; Retrace LIII: "Humpty Dumpty Sat On A Wall"
14	March 26, 2011	978-4-7575-3182-6	February 26, 2013	978-0-316-22536-6
Retrace LIV: "Blank Smile"; Retrace LV: "Black To Black"; Retrace LVI: "Rabbit Eyes"; Retrace LVII: "Humpty Dumpty had a Great Fall"
15	July 27, 2011	978-4-7575-3304-2	April 23, 2013	978-0-316-22537-3
Retrace LVIII: "Puddle of blood"; Retrace LIX: "Couldn't Put Humpty Together Again"; Retrace LX: "Egg Shell"; Retrace LXI: "Demios"
16	November 27, 2011	978-4-7575-3356-1; 978-4-7575-3357-8 (LE)	June 25, 2013	978-0-316-22538-0
Retrace LXII: "Repose"; Retrace LXIII: "Purpose"; Retrace LXIV: "Tarantelle"; Retrace LXV: "Collapse"
17	March 27, 2012	978-4-7575-3358-5; 978-4-7575-3314-1 (LE)	August 20, 2013	978-0-316-24809-9
Retrace LXVI: "Jack"; Retrace LXVII: "Lacie"; Retrace LXVIII: "Glen"; Retrace LXIX: "Alice"; Retrace LXX: "Oz"
18	July 27, 2012	978-4-7575-3682-1	October 29, 2013	978-0-3162-3975-2
Retrace LXXI: "Black Rabbit"; Retrace LXXII: "Bloody Rabbit"; Retrace LXXIII: "A Note"; Retrace LXXIV: "Broken Rabbit"
19	November 27, 2012	978-4-7575-3584-8; 978-4-7575-3586-2 (LE)	December 17, 2013	978-0-3162-4037-6
Retrace LXXV: "Alone"; Retrace LXXVI: "Alice&Oz"; Retrace LXXVII: "Vacant"; Retrace LXXVIII: "Decision"
20	May 27, 2013	978-4-7575-3585-5; 978-4-7575-3587-9 (LE)	February 18, 2014	978-0-3163-6908-4
Retrace LXXIX: "Falling"; Retrace LXXX: "Oscar Vessalius"; Retrace LXXXI: "CHILDREN"; Extra Episode: "It makes all kinds"; Retrace LXXXII: "Wish"
21	November 27, 2013	978-4-7575-4151-1	July 22, 2014	978-0-3163-7671-6
Retrace LXXXIII: "After the rain"; Retrace LXXXIV: "Trickster"; Retrace LXXXV: "Reverberate"; Extra Episode: "Together"; Retrace LXXXVI: "Wager"; Retrace LXXXVII: "Starting Point"
22	April 27, 2014	978-4-7575-4197-9; 978-4-7575-4196-2 (LE)	November 18, 2014	978-0-316-29813-1
Retrace LXXXVIII: "Answer"; Retrace LXXXIX: "Staccato drop"; Retrace XC: "Clocktower"; Retrace XCI: "Juror"; Retrace XCII: "A Story"
23	June 27, 2015	978-4-7575-4528-1	December 15, 2015	978-0-3163-5214-7
Retrace XCIII: "Abyss"; Retrace XCIV: "Blaze"; Retrace XCV: "Vincent"; Retrace XCVI: "Disagree"; Retrace XCVII: "I am"; Retrace XCVIII: "Reverberate"
24	June 27, 2015	978-4-7575-4529-8	March 22, 2016	978-0-3163-9334-8
Retrace XCIX: "Shade"; Retrace C: "Ossia"; Retrace CI: "Oswald"; Retrace CII: "The Nursery"; Retrace CIII: "Call Your Name"; Retrace CIV: "Will"
