= List of I Am Here! chapters =

The chapters of Japanese shōjo manga series I Am Here! is written and illustrated by Ema Tōyama. The series was serialized in Kodansha's shōjo manga magazine Nakayoshi from July 2007 to January 2009. Kodansha released 19 chapters of manga in 5 tankōbon volumes under Kodansha Comics imprint. The first volume published on December 6, 2007 and fifth volume on March 19, 2009. The manga is licensed in English by Del Rey Manga. The first volume was published on November 23, 2010.

== Volume list ==
No.	Original release date	Original ISBN	English release date	English ISBN
1	December 6, 2007	978-4-06-364171-4	November 23, 2010	978-0-345-52243-6
Diary 1. "Sunflower And The Sun" (ひまわりと太陽, "Himawari to Taiyō"); Diary 2. "I Always Looked At You" (ずっと 見てたよ, "Zutto Mitetayo"); Diary 3. "Hikage's Sunflower" (日かげのひまわり, "Hikage no Himawari"); Diary 4. "To A Place In The Sun" (日のあたる場所へ, "Hi no Ataru Bajo e")
2	March 6, 2008	978-4-06-364179-0	July 26, 2011	—
Diary 5. "Feelings Of Wanting To Run Away" (にげたい気持ち, "Nigetai Komochi"); Diary 6. "In The Darkness" (暗闇の中で, "Kurayami no Naka de"); Diary 7. "Important Person" (大切な人, "Taisetsu na Hito"); Diary 8. "A Warm Place" (あたたかな場所, "Atataka na Bajo")
3	July 4, 2008	978-4-06-364189-9	-	—
Diary 9. "Blog Memorie"s (ブログの思い出, Burugu no Omoide); Diary 10. "Don't go (いかないで", Ikanai de); Diary 11. "Secret Conversations" (秘密の会話, "Himitsu no Kaiwa"); Diary 12. "Deepening Doubt" (深まる疑惑, "Fukamaru Giwaku")
4	December 5, 2008	978-4-06-364205-6	-	—
Diary 13. "Black Rabbit's True Nature" (KUROウサギの正体, Kuro Usagi no shōtai); Diary 14. "Hinata and Teru" (日向と輝, hinata to Teru); Diary 15. "Their Feelings" (それぞれの思い, "Sorezore no omoi"); Diary 16. "The Two Suns" (2つの太陽, "Futatsu no Bajo")
5	March 19, 2009	978-4-06-364214-8	-	—
Diary 17. "Before the sunflower blooms" (ひまわりが咲くまでに, "Himawari ga Saku made ni"); Diary 18. "The last place" (最後の居場所, "Saigo no Ibajo"); Last Diary. "In This Place From Now On" (これからも この場所で, "Korekara mo Kono Bajo de")
