= List of Highschool of the Dead chapters =

Cover of the first tankōbon of Highschool of the Dead as released by Fujimi Shobo on March 1, 2007

Highschool of the Dead is a manga series written by Daisuke Satō and illustrated by Shoji Satō. Set in the present day, the world is struck by a deadly pandemic that turns humans into zombies, euphemistically referred to by the main characters as "Them". The story follows a group of students at Fujimi High School: Takashi Komuro, Rei Miyamoto, Saeko Busujima, Saya Takagi, and Kohta Hirano; Shizuka Marikawa, the high school's nurse, and a young girl as they fight their way to safety through the deadly streets of Japan during a worldwide catastrophic event known as the "Outbreak".

It began serialization in the September 2006 issue of Fujimi Shobo's manga magazine Monthly Dragon Age. The manga went on hiatus from 2008 to 2010, but after March 2011, only one more chapter was released in April 2013. The series was left unfinished following Daisuke Satō's death on March 22, 2017. Fujimi Shobo and Kadokawa Shoten published seven tankōbon volumes from March 1, 2007, and April 25, 2011, in Japan.

In North America, the manga is licensed by Yen Press, and the first English volume was released on January 25, 2011. The manga has also been published in Spain by Glénat España, in Germany by Carlsen, in Italy and Brazil by Panini Comics, in Canada and France for French-language publication by Pika Édition, and in Taiwan by Kadokawa Media.

A full-color version of the manga, called Highschool of the Dead: Full-Color Edition (学園黙示録 HIGHSCHOOL OF THE DEAD FULL COLOR EDITION) began serialization in the February 2011 issue of Monthly Dragon Age. Kadokawa Shoten released the manga's seven volumes from February 25, 2011, to March 9, 2013. In North America, the full-color edition began serialization in the March 2011 issue of Yen Press' Yen Plus online magazine, and ran until the July 2011 issue. The volumes were later released in two hardcover omnibus volumes on November 22, 2011, and December 17, 2013.

An anime adaptation produced by Madhouse aired in Japan between July and September 2010 on AT-X and other networks. The chapters in the series are called "Acts", and some of the chapter titles are plays on elements of American popular culture (e.g.: "Guns n' Deads"→Guns N' Roses; "The Good, the Bad, and the Dead"→The Good, the Bad, and the Ugly).

== Volumes list ==
=== Original volumes ===
No.	Original release date	Original ISBN	English release date	English ISBN
1	February 27, 2007 (Original); February 24, 2011 (Color)	978-4-04-712483-7 (Original); 978-4-04-926269-8 (Color)	January 25, 2011	978-0-316-13225-1
Act.1: Spring of the Dead; Act.2: Escape from the Dead; Act.3: Democracy Under the Dead
2	March 28, 2007 (Original); February 24, 2011 (Color)	978-4-04-712489-9 (Original); 978-4-04-926270-4 (Color)	April 26, 2011	978-0-316-13239-8
Act.4: Running in the Dead; Act.5: Streets of the Dead; Act.6: In the Dead of the Night; Act.7: Dead Night and the Dead Ruck
3	October 4, 2007 (Original); March 25, 2011 (Color)	978-4-04-712515-5 (Original); 978-4-04-926271-1 (Color)	July 19, 2011	978-0-316-13242-8
Act.8: Alice in Dead Land; Act.9: The Dead Way Home; Act.10: Father Knows Dead; Act.11: The Dead's House Rules; Act.12: The Sum of all Dead
4	March 6, 2008 (Original); March 25, 2011 (Color)	978-4-04-712537-7 (Original); 978-4-04-926272-8 (Color)	October 25, 2011	978-0-316-13245-9
Act.13: Guns 'n Deads; Act.14: Dead Storm Rising; Act.15: All Dead's Attack; Act.16: The Girl Next Dead; Act.17: The Sword and Dead
5	September 5, 2008 (Original); February 6, 2013 (Color)	978-4-04-712563-6 (Original); 978-4-04-926273-5 (Color)	January 24, 2012	978-0-316-13246-6
Act.18: Legend of the Dead; Act.19: Flags of The Dead; Act.20: Blood and Dead; Act.21: The Good, the Bad, and the Dead; Act.22: Dead Rush
6	July 7, 2010 (Original); February 6, 2013 (Color)	978-4-04-712673-2 (Original); 978-4-04-926274-2 (Color)	April 24, 2012	978-0-316-20943-4
Act.23: Dead Lovers; Act.24: Dance with the Dead; Act.25: Duty and Dead
7	April 26, 2011 (Original, w/Blu-ray edition); May 9, 2011 (Original, regular ed.); March 6, 2013 (Color)	978-4-04-712691-6 (Original, w/Blu-ray ed.); 978-4-04-712722-7 (Original, regular ed.); 978-4-04-926275-9 (Color)	July 24, 2012	978-0-316-20944-1
Act.26: The Dead Badge of Coward; Act.27: Assault on Dead Precinct; Act.28: Deadlock; Act.29: Dead in the Rain

=== English omnibus volumes ===
No.	English release date	English ISBN
1	November 22, 2011	978-0-316-20104-9
Vols. 1–4
2	December 17, 2013	978-0-316-25086-3
Vols. 5–7

== Not in tankōbon format ==
- Act.30: Intellect, Emotion, and Dead (released in the May 2013 issue of Fujimi Shobo's Dragon Age on April 9)
