= List of Nura: Rise of the Yokai Clan chapters =

The chapters of the Nura: Rise of the Yokai Clan manga series were written and illustrated by Hiroshi Shiibashi. The series was first published in Shueisha as a one-shot in 2007. It was serialized in Shueisha's shōnen manga magazine Weekly Shōnen Jump from 2008 to 2012, with its chapters collected in 25 tankōbon volumes.

Viz Media acquired the licensing rights for a North American release of the manga and anime adaptations.

== Volumes list ==
No.	Title	Original release date	English release date
1	Becoming the Master of All Spirits; Chimimōryō no Nushi to Naru (魑魅魍魎の主となる)	August 4, 2008; 978-4-08-874557-2	February 1, 2011; 978-1-421-53891-4
01. "Becoming the Master of All Spirits" (魑魅魍魎の主となる, Chimimōryō no Nushi to Naru); 02. "Rikuo Parades Through the School at Night" (リクオ、夜の学校をねり歩く, Rikuo, Yoru no Gakkō o Neriaruku); 03. "Rikuo Gets Angry at His Sworn Brother" (リクオ、義兄弟に怒られる, Rikuo, Gikyōdai ni Okorareru); 04. "Rikuo Dreams" (リクオ、夢を見る, Rikuo, Yume o Miru); 05. "Rikuo is Present at the Formation of the Kiyo Cross Squad" (リクオ、清十字団結成に立ち会う, Rikuo, Kiyojūjidan Kessei ni Tachiau); 06. "Rikuo Explores his Home" (リクオ、実家を探検される, Rikuo, Jikka o Tankensareru); 07. "Rikuo Goes to First Street" (リクオ、一番街へ行く, Rikuo, Ichibangai e Iku); Extra Story "The Nura Clan's True History: Story of Conflict in the Main House" (実録奴良組史 本家抗争編, Jitsuroku Nura-gumi Shi: Honke Kōsō-hen)
2	Rikuo Faces Off Against Gyuki; Rikuo, Gyūki to Taijisuru (リクオ、牛鬼と対峙する)	October 3, 2008; 978-4-08-874581-7	April 5, 2011; 978-1-421-53892-1
08. "Rikuo Faces Off Against Kyuso's Fangs" (リクオ、窮鼠の牙と対峙する, Rikuo, Kyūso no Kiba to Taijisuru); 09. "Rikuo Gets a Fever" (リクオ、熱を出す, Rikuo, Netsu o Dasu); 10. "Rikuo Goes on a Yokai Mystery Tour" (リクオ、妖怪ミステリーツアーに行く, Rikuo, Yōkai Misuterī Tsuā ni Iku); 11. "Rikuo Stays at Mt. Nejireme" (リクオ、捩眼山に留まる, Rikuo, Nejireme-yama ni Todomaru); 12. "Rikuo Goes Out on a Nighttime Search" (リクオ、夜の探索に出る, Rikuo, Yoru no Tansaku ni Deru); 13. "Rikuo on the Night of the New Moon" (リクオ、新月の夜に, Rikuo, Shingetsu no Yoru ni); 14. "Rikuo Stands on the Summit of Mt. Nejireme" (リクオ、捩眼山の頂上に立つ, Rikuo, Nejireme-yama no Chōjō ni Tatsu); 15. "Rikuo Faces Off Against Gyuki" (リクオ、牛鬼と対峙する, Rikuo, Gyūki to Taijisuru)
3	Nura Clan General Assembly; Nura-gumi Sōkai (奴良組総会)	January 5, 2009; 978-4-08-874621-0	June 7, 2011; 978-1-421-53893-8
16. "Umewakamaru and Gyuki" (梅若丸と牛鬼, Umewakamaru to Gyūki); 17. "Gyuki's Beloved Nura Clan" (牛鬼の愛した奴良組, Gyūki no Aishita Nura-gumi); 18. "Kana, 13 Years Old" (「カナ、13歳」, Kana, Jūsan-sai); 19. "Kana and the Yokai, Ungaikyo" (カナと妖怪・雲外鏡, Kana to Yōkai Ungaikyō); 20. "Kana's Birthday" (カナの誕生日, Kana no Tanjōbi); 21. "Nura Clan General Assembly" (奴良組総会, Nura-gumi Sōkai); 22. "Wind Yokai" (風の妖怪, Kaze no Yōkai); 23. "Keikain Style Onmyojutsu" (花開院流陰陽術, Keikain-ryū Onmyōjutsu); 24. "Nurarihyon's Power" (ぬらりひょんの力, Nurarihyon no Chikara); Extra Story "Story of Conflict in the Kiyojuji Mystery Detective Squad" (清十字怪奇探偵団抗争編, Kiyojūji Kaiki Tantei-dan Kōsō-hen)
4	Shikoku's Parade of Eighty-Eight Demons; Shikoku Hachijūhakki Yakō (四国八十八鬼夜行)	April 3, 2009; 978-4-08-874655-5	August 2, 2011; 978-1-421-53894-5
25. "The Seven Travelers" (七人同行, Shichinin Dōgyō); 26. "Shikoku's Parade of Eighty-Eight Demons" (四国八十八鬼夜行, Shikoku Hachijūhakki Yakō); 27. "Sodemogi-sama" (袖モギ様, Sodemogi-sama); 28. "Hibari and Senba-sama" (ひばりと千羽様, Hibari to Senba-sama); 29. "The Yokai, Inugami: Part 1" (妖怪・犬神 その1, Yōkai Inugami Sono Ichi); 30. "The Yokai, Inugami: Part 2" (妖怪・犬神 その2, Yōkai Inugami Sono Ni); 31. "The Yokai, Inugami: Part 3" (妖怪・犬神 その3, Yōkai Inugami Sono San); 32. "The Yokai, Inugami: Part 4" (妖怪・犬神 その4, Yōkai Inugami Sono Yon); 33. "The Yokai, Inugami: Part 5" (妖怪・犬神 その5, Yōkai Inugami Sono Go)
5	A Yokai with Wings Darker Than Darkness; Yami yori Kurai Tsubasa o Motsu Yōkai (闇より暗い翼を持つ妖怪)	June 4, 2009; 978-4-08-874667-8	October 4, 2011; 978-142-1-53895-2
34. "The Yokai, Inugami: Part 6" (妖怪・犬神 その6, Yōkai Inugami Sono Roku); 35. "Nurarihyon's Journey to Shikoku" (総大将四国への旅, Nurarihyon Shikoku e no Tabi); 36. "Counterattack" (反撃, Hangeki); 37. "Gozu and Mezu, Secret Agents: Part 1" (牛頭馬頭密偵隊 その1, Gozu Mezu Mittei-tai Sono Ichi); 38. "Gozu and Mezu, Secret Agents: Part 2" (牛頭馬頭密偵隊 その2, Gozu Mezu Mittei-tai Sono Ni); 39. "Gozu and Mezu's Return" (牛頭馬頭の帰還, Gozu Mezu no Kikan); 40. "A Hyakki Yako's Sakazuki" (百鬼夜行の盃, Hyakki Yakō no Sakazuki); 41. "Hyakki Yako vs. Hachijuhakki Yako" (百鬼夜行対八十八鬼夜行, Hyakki Yakō tai Hachijūhakki Yakō); 42. "A Yokai with Wings Darker Than Darkness" (闇より暗い翼を持つ妖怪, Yami yori Kurai Tsubasa o Motsu Yōkai); Extra Story "Yura at the HOUSE OF KANA" (ゆら at the HOUSE OF KANA, Yura atto za Hausu Obu Kana)
6	The House Where the Jami Lurks; Jami no Tadayou Ie (邪魅の漂う家)	August 4, 2009; 978-4-08-874717-0	December 6, 2011; 978-1-421-53896-9
43. "White Snow Standing Out in the Darkness" (闇に際立つ白い雪, Yami ni Kiwadatsu Shiroi Yuki); 44. "The Heads" (幹部戦, Kanbu-sen); 45. "The Devil's Hammer" (魔王の小槌, Maō no Kozuchi); 46. "Inugami Gyobu-Danuki: Tamazuki" (隠神刑部狸・玉章, Inugami Gyōbu-Danuki Tamazuki); 47. "The End of Ambition" (野望の終幕, Yabō no Shūmaku); 48. "The House Where the Jami Lurks: Part 1" (邪魅の漂う家 その1, Jami no Tadayou Ie Sono Ichi); 49. "The House Where the Jami Lurks: Part 2" (邪魅の漂う家 その2, Jami no Tadayou Ie Sono Ni); 50. "The House Where the Jami Lurks: Part 3" (邪魅の漂う家 その3, Jami no Tadayou Ie Sono San); 51. "Their Justice" (二人の正義, Futari no Seigi); Extra Story "Strange Tales of Ukiyoe Town" (浮世絵町奇譚, Ukiyoe-chō Kitan)
7	The Three Keikain Siblings; Keikain San-Kyōdai (花開院三兄妹)	October 2, 2009; 978-4-08-874738-5	February 7, 2012; 978-1-421-53897-6
52. "Warriors of Blue and Black" (青と黒の戦士, Ao to Kuro no Senshi); 53. "Worry" (懊悩, Ōnō); 54. "False Words" (偽りの言葉, Itsuwari no Kotoba); 55. "Deception" (だまし合い, Damashiai); 56. "True Identity" (正体, Shōtai); 57. "Convincing Keikain Yura" (花開院ゆらの納得, Keikain Yura no Nattoku); 58. "Spirit Blade Nenekirimaru, Part 1: Strange Tales of Ukiyoe Town, The Oitekebori" (妖刀・祢々切丸その1 浮世絵町奇譚 置行堀, Yōtō Nenekirimaru Sono Ichi: Ukiyoe-chō Kitan Oitekebori); 59. "The Anti-Demon Blade and the Pipe: Spirit Blade Nenekirimaru, Part 2" (退魔刀とキセル 妖刀・祢々切丸その2, Taimatō to Kiseru: Yōtō Nenekirimaru Sono Ni); 60. "Nurarihyon and Yohime: Spirit Blade Nenekirimaru, Part 3" (ぬらりひょんと珱姫 妖刀・祢々切丸その3, Nurarihyon to Yōhime: Yōtō Nenekirimaru Sono San)
8	Connecting to the Present; Ima e to Tsunagu (今へと繋ぐ)	December 4, 2009; 978-4-08-874767-5	April 3, 2012; 978-1-421-53898-3
61. "A Certain Ayakashi's Proposal: Spirit Blade Nenekirimaru, Part 4" (ある妖の求婚 妖刀・祢々切丸その4, Aru Ayakashi no Kyūkon: Yōtō Nenekirimaru Sono Yon); 62. "The Captured Princess: Spirit Blade Nenekirimaru, Part 5" (囚われの姫様 妖刀・祢々切丸その5, Toraware no Hime-sama: Yōtō Nenekirimaru Sono Go); 63. "The Beast Path: Spirit Blade Nenekirimaru, Part 6" (獣道 妖刀・祢々切丸その6, Kemono Michi: Yōtō Nenekirimaru Sono Roku); 64. "For Example, Perhaps, Sakura: Spirit Blade Nenekirimaru, Part 7" (例えるなら桜 妖刀・祢々切丸その7, Tatoeru Nara Sakura: Yōtō Nenekirimaru Sono Shichi); 65. "Castle Keep: Spirit Blade Nenekirimaru, Part 8" (天守閣 妖刀・祢々切丸その8, Tenshukaku: Yōtō Nenekirimaru Sono Hachi); 66. "Connecting to the Present" (今へと繋ぐ, Ima e to Tsunagu); 67. "The Eight Kekkai" (八つの結界, Yattsu no Kekkai); 68. "The Supreme Commander vs. the Young Head" (総大将対若頭, Nurarihyon tai Nurarihyon); 69. "The Tono Story, Part 1: The Hidden Village" (遠野・物語 その1/隠れ里, Tōno Monogatari Sono Ichi/Kakurezato)
9	The Tono Story; Tōno Monogatari (遠野・物語)	February 4, 2010; 978-4-08-874796-5	June 5, 2012; 978-1-421-53899-0
70. "The Tono Story, Part 2: Kamaitachi" (遠野・物語 その2/鎌鼬, Tōno Monogatari Sono Ni/Kamaitachi); 71. "The Tono Story, Part 3: The Kyoto Yokai, Kidomaru" (遠野・物語 その3/京妖怪・鬼童丸, Tōno Monogatari Sono San/Kyō-Yōkai Kidōmaru); 72. "The Tono Story, Part 4: Kyoka Suigetsu" (遠野・物語 その4/鏡花水月, Tōno Monogatari Sono Yon/Kyōka Suigetsu); 73. "Hagoromo Gitsune's Total Destruction Invasion of Kyoto" (羽衣狐京都全滅侵攻, Hagoromo Gitsune Kyōto Zenmetsu Shinkō); 74. "The Keikain Main House" (花開院本家, Keikain Honke); 75. "Decisive Battle at Rokukin-ji!!" (鹿金寺の決戦!!, Rokukin-ji no Kessen!!); 76. "Leaving Tono!!" (遠野をたつ!!, Tōno o Tatsu!!); 77. "Return" (帰還, Kikan)
10	City Engulfed in Darkness; Yami ni Nomareru Miyako (闇にのまれる都)	April 2, 2010; 978-4-08-870023-6	August 7, 2012; 978-1-421-53900-3
78. "City Engulfed in Darkness" (闇にのまれる都, Yami ni Nomareru Miyako); 79. "The Gray Onmyoji" (灰色の陰陽師, Haiiro no Onmyōji); 80. "Yaso Style Onmyojutsu" (八十流陰陽術, Yaso-ryū Onmyōjutsu); 81. "Hagun" (破軍, Hagun); 82. "Sudden Meeting" (邂逅, Kaikō); 83. "Treasure Ship" (宝船, Takarabune); 84. "Scythe and Cat's Cradle" (鎌とあやとり, Kama to Ayatori); 85. "The Start of War" (緒戦, Shosen); 86. "Battle in the Kyoto Sky" (京上空の戦い, Kyō Jōkū no Tatakai)
11	Labyrinth: The Forest of Torii; Meikyū: Torii no Mori (迷宮・鳥居の森)	July 2, 2010; 978-4-08-870049-6	October 2, 2012; 978-1-421-54140-2
87. "Humans and Ayakashi" (人と妖, Hito to Ayakashi); 88. "Shot Down" (撃墜, Gekitsui); 89. "Desire" (宿願, Shukugan); 90. "Labyrinth: The Forest of Torii" (迷宮・鳥居の森, Meikyū: Torii no Mori); 91. "The Amanojaku, Awashima" (天邪鬼・淡島, Amanojaku Awashima); 92. "The Name of Awashima" (淡島の名, Awashima no Na); 93. "Join" (合流, Gōryū); 94. "An Ayakashi You Must Never Encounter" (絶対に遭遇してはならない妖, Zettai ni Sōgū Shitewa Naranai Ayakashi); 95. "Tsuchigumo" (土蜘蛛, Tsuchigumo)
12	Ondeko; Ondeko (鬼太鼓)	September 3, 2010; 978-4-08-870105-9	December 4, 2012; 978-1-421-54141-9
96. "Roar" (咆哮, Hōkō); 97. "Nightmare" (悪夢, Akumu); 98. "Day and Night" (昼と夜, Hiru to Yoru); 99. "Sink Into Darkness..." (闇に沈む…, Yami ni Shizumu...); 100. "The Smell of Blood" (血の匂い, Chi no Nioi); 101. "Ondeko" (鬼太鼓, Ondeko); 102. "Their Pasts" (二人の過去, Futari no Kako); 103. "Strength and Strength" (力と力, Chikara to Chikara); Extra Story "The Nura Clan's Third Generation Records ~The Story of the Dawn of Edo~" (奴良組三代記～江戸黎明期編～, Nura-gumi Sandaiki ~Edo Reimeiki-hen~); Extra Story "Yura Returns to Kyoto ~The New Brothers' Baptism~" (ゆら、京都に帰る～新しき兄たちの洗礼～, Yura, Kyōto ni Kaeru ~Atarashiki Ani-tachi no Senrei~)
13	Conflict; Sōkoku (相剋)	November 4, 2010; 978-4-08-870127-1	February 5, 2013; 978-1-42-154142-6
104. "Intruders Who Rend the Sky" (空を裂く侵入者, Sora o Saku Shin'nyūsha); 105. "Shokera" (しょうけら, Shōkera); 106. "Crying Blue Oni" (泣いた青鬼, Naita Ao-oni); 107. "Towards an Uncertain Leader" (否慥の主へ, Hizō no Nushi e); 108. "The Deed of Wearing a Hyakki" (百鬼纏う御業, Hyakki Matou Miwaza); 109. "Conflict" (相剋, Sōkoku); 110. "Entrust Everything to Me" (全部あずけろ, Zenbu Azukero); 111. "Crimson-Blooming Saxifrage" (雪の下紅梅, Yuki-no-shita Beniume); 112. "Full Power" (全開, Zenkai)
14	To Nijo Castle...!! Nijō-jō e...!! (弐條城へ…!!)	December 29, 2010; 978-4-08-870163-9	April 2, 2013; 978-1-42-155139-5
113. "Tono and Rikuo" (遠野とリクオ, Tōno to Rikuo); 114. "Bonds Carried on the Back" (背中越しの絆, Senaka-goshi no Kizuna); 115. "Old Enemy" (宿敵, Shukuteki); 116. "Fetal Movements " (胎動, Taidō); 117. "To Nijo Castle...!!" (弐條城へ…!!, Nijō-jō e...!!); 118. "Satori and Oni-Hitokuchi" (サトリと鬼一口, Satori to Oni-Hitokuchi); 119. "The Corridors of Nijo Castle" (弐條城回廊, Nijō-jō Kairō); 120. "The Circle of Reincarnation" (輪廻の環, Rinne no Wa); 121. "Rajomon" (羅城門, Rajōmon)
15	Fragments of Recollection; Tsuioku no Kakera (追憶の欠片)	March 4, 2011; 978-4-08-870189-9	June 4, 2013; 978-1-42-155140-1
122. "The Void" (虚空, Kokū); 123. "Sword Fight" (刀閃, Tōsen); 124. "Birth" (誕生, Tanjō); 125. "Trap" (罠, Wana); 126. "Fissure" (亀裂, Kiretsu); 127. "Things Kept Secret" (秘められたもの, Himerareta Mono); 128. "In a Grove" (藪の中, Yabu no Naka); 129. "Fragments of Recollection" (追憶の欠片, Tsuioku no Kakera); Extra Story "Strange Tales of Ukiyoe Middle School" (浮世絵中奇譚, Ukiyoe-chū Kitan); Extra Story "Rikuo Sees That Dream Again" (リクオ また例の夢を見る, Rikuo Mata Rei no Yume o Miru)
16	Rikuo Makes a Declaration; Rikuo, Sengensu (リクオ、宣言す)	May 2, 2011; 978-4-08-870221-6	August 6, 2013; 978-1-42-155141-8
130. "He Who Whispers in the Dark" (闇に囁く者, Yami ni Sasayaku Mono); 131. "Banquet of Darkness" (暗黒の宴, Ankoku no Utage); 132. "Kyoto in Flames" (京都炎上, Kyōto Enjō); 133. "Just the Same" (うり二つ, Urifutatsu); 134. "Rikuo Makes a Declaration" (リクオ、宣言す, Rikuo, Sengensu); 135. "Tsurara and the Koribachi" (氷麗と氷鉢, Tsurara to Kōribachi); 136. "Tsurara and the Arawashi Clan" (氷麗と荒鷲組, Tsurara to Arawashi-gumi); 137. "The Toilet Yokai" (便所の妖怪, Benjo no Yōkai); 138. "Toryanse the Ripper" (切裂とおりゃんせ, Kirisaki Tōryanse)
17	Toryanse the Ripper; Kirisaki Tōryanse (切裂とおりゃんせ)	July 4, 2011; 978-4-08-870266-7	October 1, 2013; 978-1-42-155142-5
139. "Toryanse the Ripper, Continued" (続・切裂とおりゃんせ, Zoku: Kirisaki Tōryanse); 140. "Toryanse the Ripper, Further Continued" (続々・切裂とおりゃんせ, Zokuzoku: Kirisaki Tōryanse); 141. "The Human-Eating Village" (人を喰らう村, Hito o Kurau Mura); 142. "The Human-Eating Village, Continued" (続・人を喰らう村, Zoku: Hito o Kurau Mura); 143. "The Human-Eating Village, Further Continued" (続々・人を喰らう村, Zokuzoku: Hito o Kurau Mura); 144. "The Subway Girl" (地下鉄の少女, Chikatetsu no Shōjo); 145. "The Subway Girl, Continued" (続・地下鉄の少女, Zoku: Chikatetsu no Shōjo); 146. "The Subway Girl, Further Continued" (続々・地下鉄の少女, Zokuzoku: Chikatetsu no Shōjo); 147. "The Hundred Tales" (百物語, Hyaku Monogatari)
18	The Flowers of Edo; Edo no Hana (江戸の華)	September 2, 2011; 978-4-08-870293-3	December 3, 2013; 978-1-42-155143-2
148. "The Flowers of Edo" (江戸の華, Edo no Hana); 149. "The Teakettle of a Hundred Demons" (百鬼の茶釜, Hyakki no Chagama); 150. "The Mystery of Kurotabo" (黒田坊の怪, Kurotabō no Kai); 151. "Crossing Each Other's Paths" (交差する二人, Kōsasuru Futari); 152. "Ripple" (波紋, Hamon); 153. "A Million Ghost Stories" (怪談百万遍, Kaidan Hyakumanpen); 154. "Fight" (出入り, Deiri); 155. "The Hundred Tales: The Hundredth" (百物語・その百, Hyaku Monogatari: Sono Hyaku); 156. "Out of Control" (暴走, Bōsō)
19	Ghost Story: Kudan; Kaidan: Kudan (怪談・件)	December 2, 2011; 978-4-08-870315-2	February 4, 2014; 978-1-42-155913-1
157. "Those Who Are Born" (生まれ出でし者共, Umareideshi Monodomo); 158. "Sakazuki Exchanged in the Depths of a Strange Land" (異境の淵で交わす盃, Ikyō no Fuchi de Kawasu Sakazuki); 159. "Battle Cry" (鬨の声, Toki no Koe); 160. "Prediction" (予言, Yogen); 161. "Strange Appetite" (悪食, Akujiki); 162. "Transformation of Resolution" (覚悟の変化, Kakugo no Henge); 163. "Tokyo Tag" (東京鬼ごっこ, Tōkyō Onigokko); 164. "The Chasers and the Chased" (追う者追われる者, Ou Mono Owareru Mono); 165. "Raiden" (雷電, Raiden)
20	Kusozu; Kusōzu (九相図)	February 3, 2012; 978-4-08-870370-1	April 1, 2014; 978-1-42-155914-8
166. "Tamasaburo" (珠三郎, Tamasaburō); 167. "Kiyotsugu's Resolve" (清継の決意, Kiyotsugu no Ketsui); 168. "Rikuo Changes" (リクオ変貌, Rikuo Henbō); 169. "Painting of Hell" (地獄絵図, Jigoku Ezu); 170. "Panic" (パニック, Panikku); 171. "The Great Escape" (大脱出, Dai-dasshutsu); 172. "Rescue" (救出, Kyūshutsu); 173. "Two Blades" (二枚の刃, Ni-mai no Yaiba); 174. "Fear of Resolution" (覚悟の畏, Kakugo no Osore)
21	Ghost Story: Ao-Andon; Kaidan: Ao-Andon (怪談・青行燈)	April 4, 2012; 978-4-08-870402-9	June 3, 2014; 978-1-42-156476-0
175. "Shadow" (影, Kage); 176. "Each Duty" (夫々の仁義, Sorezore no Jingi); 177. "Ajara Enbu" (戯演舞, Ajara Enbu); 178. "Rushing into Fukagawa" (深川突入, Fukagawa Totsunyū); 179. "Encho" (圓潮, Enchō); 180. "Ao-Andon" (青行燈, Ao-Andon); 181. "Means of Survival" (活路, Katsuro); 182. "Heptagram" (七芒星, Shichibōsei); 183. "An Embodiment of Resentment" (怨恨のみの存在, Urami nomi no Sonzai); 184. "The Conclusion, And Then..." (決着、そして…, Ketchaku, Soshite...)
22	Time of Purification; Shōjō no Toki (清浄の時)	July 4, 2012; 978-4-08-870464-7	August 5, 2014; 978-1-42-156477-7
185. "To Mount Osore..." (恐山へ…, Osore-zan e...); 186. "The Gokadoin House" (御門院家, Gokadoin-ke); 187. "The Necromantical Barrier Specialist" (口寄せの結界師, Kuchiyose no Kekkai-shi); 188. "A Thousand Years' Sentiments" (千年の想い, Sen-nen no Omoi); 189. "The Katana's Voice" (刀の声, Katana no Koe); 190. "Time of Purification" (清浄の時, Shōjō no Toki); 191. "Rikuo Invites Friends Home" (リクオ、実家に友人を招く, Rikuo, Jikka ni Yūjin o Maneku); 192. "The Grand Assembly" (大会議, Dai-kaigi); 193. "Tsuchigumo Returns Home" (土蜘蛛、故郷へ帰る, Tsuchigumo, Kokyō e Kaeru)
23	The Great Kyushu Yokai Battle; Kyūshū Yōkai Dai Kessen (九州妖怪大決戦)	October 4, 2012; 978-4-08-870498-2	October 7, 2014; 978-1-42-156478-4
194. "Archipelago Tremors" (列島震撼, Rettō Shinkan); 195. "That Story, Once More..." (もう1度、あの話を, Mō Ichido, Ano Hanashi o); 196. "Tsuchigumo's Past" (土蜘蛛の過去, Tsuchigumo no Kako); 197. "Local War" (局地戦, Kyokuchi-sen); 198. "Yura and Rikuo" (ゆらとリクオ, Yura to Rikuo); 199. "Proof of Strength" (強さの証明, Tsuyosa no Shōmei); 200. "Those Who Shoulder the New Darkness" (新たな闇を担う者, Aratana Yami o Ninau Mono); 201. "Spiral Barrier" (螺旋結界, Rasen Kekkai); 202. "The Lord of Kyoto" (京の主, Kyō no Nushi)
24	Battle of Aoi Spiral Castle; Aoi supairaru-jō notatakai (葵螺旋城の闘い)	December 4, 2012; 978-4-08-870534-7	December 2, 2014; 978-1-42-156479-1
203. "The Night Before The Assault" (突入前夜, Totsunyū Zen'ya); 204. "Revival" (再誕, Saitan); 205. "An Ayakashi's Duty" (妖の本分, Ayakashi no Honbun); 206. "Talent" (才能, Sainō); 207. "He Who Shoulders the Hundred Demons" (百鬼を背負いし者, Hyakki o Seoishi Mono); 208. "Clash of the One-Quarter Yokai" (交差する四分の血, Kōsasuru Shibu no Chi); Extra Story "Fear of a Demonic Swordsman" (幕末に剣鬼の畏あり, Bakumatsu ni Kenki no Osore Ari)
25	He Who Equips True Fear; Shin no Osore o Matou Mono (真の畏を鬼纏う者)	March 4, 2013; 978-4-08-870616-0	February 3, 2015; 978-1-42-156480-7
209. "Where it Ends" (決着の地, Ketchaku no Chi); 210. "He Who Equips True Fear" (真の畏を鬼纏う者, Shin no Osore o Matou Mono); Extra Story "Inherited Bonds" (受け継がれる絆, Uketsugareru Kizuna); Extra Story "The Third Heir Gone Wild?!" (三代目、御乱心⁉, Sandaime, Goranshin⁉); Extra Story "Dark Pawnbroker" (闇の質屋, Yami no Shichiya); Extra Story "In the Village of Half-Yokai" (半妖の里にて, Hanyō no Sato nite); Extra Bonus
