= List of Arisa chapters =

The chapters of the mystery manga series Arisa were written and illustrated by Natsumi Ando. The series appeared as a serial in Kodansha's monthly shōjo (targeted towards girls) manga magazine Nakayoshi from the February 2009 issue to the September 2012 issue. Kodansha has collected the chapters into twelve bound volumes and published them from April 28, 2009, to September 6, 2012.

North American publisher Del Rey announced in September 2009 to have the series licensed for North America. Del Rey released the first volume, but shortly after Kodansha announced that they would be taking over from Del Rey on a case to case basis. On December 12, 2010, Kodansha Comics officially announced that they would be continuing Arisa in North America starting in May 2011.

== Volume List ==
No.	Original release date	Original ISBN	English release date	English ISBN
01	April 28, 2009	978-4-06-364218-6	October 26, 2010	978-0-345-52241-2
01 Tsubasa and Arisa; 02 Himetsubaki Junior High, Class 2-B; 03 King Time; 04 Akira Manabe
02	September 4, 2009	978-4-06-364234-6	May 17, 2011	978-1-93-542916-6
05 The Athletics Festival is Targeted; 06 Fragments of Truth; 07 Warning; 08 8001
03	December 25, 2009	978-4-06-364246-9	July 12, 2011	978-1-93-542917-3
09 Planetarium; 10 Mariko Takagi; 11 The Owner of the Number; 12 Transfer Student
04	April 30, 2010	978-4-06-364264-3	September 6, 2011	978-1-93-542918-0
13 Flames; 14 Darkness and Light; 15 The Last Number; 16 Sneaking In
05	September 6, 2010	978-4-06-364277-3	November 8, 2011	978-1-93-542919-7
17 The First Victim; 18 Something Precious; 19 Six Months Ago; 20 Another Shizuka
06	December 6, 2010	978-4-06-364287-2	January 17, 2012	978-1-61-262039-8
21 Revelations; 22 The Whereabouts of a Wish; 23 Gift; Bonus Story: Promise of Fireworks
07	March 4, 2011	978-4-06-364301-5	April 3, 2012	978-1-61-262114-2
24 The Truth of June 6th; 25 The Last Chosen One; 26 The Best Class in the World; Bonus Story: Takeru
08	July 6, 2011	978-4-06-364312-1	July 17, 2012	978-1-61-262162-3
27 Crime and Punishment; 28 Elimination; 29 Break Down; 30 Confinement
09	December 6, 2011	978-4-06-364326-8	October 2, 2012	978-1-61-262240-8
31 The Lost Time; 32 The Truth of Memory; 33 Betrayal; 34 Hug of Lies
10	April 6, 2012	978-4-06-364347-3	April 16, 2013	978-1-61262-251-4
35 The Clockwork Clown; 36 The Flower Bouquet Given To K; 37 The Two Kings; 38 The King's Faint Smile
11	September 6, 2012	978-4-06-364361-9	September 10, 2013	978-1-61262-252-1
39 The King's Letter; 40 Sorrowful Twins; 41 The Targeted Summit; 41.2 (Special) Mariko
12	September 6, 2012	978-4-06-364363-3	January 21, 2014	978-1-61262-439-6
42 Blade of Revenge; 43 True Wish; 44 Last Wish; (Special Chapter)Tsubasa
