= List of Rin-ne chapters =

Cover of the first tankōbon volume, as published by Shogakukan in 2009

The manga series Rin-ne is written and illustrated by Rumiko Takahashi. The first chapter premiered on April 22, 2009, in Weekly Shōnen Sunday and the last was released on December 13, 2017. The series focuses on Sakura Mamiya, a girl who gained the power to see ghosts after an incident as a child, and her classmate Rinne Rokudo, a boy of mixed human and shinigami heritage who helps lingering spirits finally pass on to be reincarnated. Shogakukan released 40 tankōbon volumes in Japan from October 16, 2009 to January 18, 2018. Rin-ne is licensed for an English-language release in North America by Viz Media, which published the chapters simultaneously online in English as they were serialized in Japan until March 17, 2011. Viz Media began releasing the volumes of Rin-ne on October 20, 2009, as the first title under their Shonen Sunday imprint, and published the last volume on July 13, 2021.

== Volume list ==
No.	Original release date	Original ISBN	English release date	English ISBN
01	October 16, 2009	978-4-0912-1773-8	October 20, 2009	978-1-4215-3485-5
001. "The Mysterious Classmate" (謎のクラスメート, Nazo no Kurasumēto); 002. "The Legend of the Weather Hutch" (百葉箱の伝説, Hyakuyōbako no Densetsu); 003. "Four O'clock Behind the Gym" (体育館裏4時, Taiikukan Ura 4-ji); 004. "Have We Met?" (どこかで会った女(ひと), Dokoka de Atta Hito); 005. "Y·O·U·N·G Woman" (お・ね・え・さ・ん, O Ne E Sa N); 006. "Mystery in the Club Building" (クラブ棟の怪, Kurabutō no Kai); 007. "Black Cat by Contract" (契約黒猫, Keiyaku Kuroneko); 008. "Afraid to Fall Asleep" (眠るのがこわい, Nemuru no ga Kowai)
Sakura Mamiya is a high school student living with the ability to see ghosts after an event in her past where she met a shinigami in the underworld, though she does not remember this. Sakura meets a classmate named Rinne Rokudo others cannot see, leading her to suspect he is a ghost. She discovers later he is actually a shinigami of sorts, and when he is wearing his Haori of the Underworld, normal people cannot see him. Rinne helps Sakura by exorcising a ghost which has been following her around as well as the spirit of a chihuahua. Sakura's friend Rika is plagued by a ghost calling her cell phone and leaving the same angry message. Rinne tells them how if they leave a letter and offering in the weather hutch behind the school, that they will get help. Rinne takes the offering and tracks down the angry spirit, which he promptly exorcises to the afterlife with some help by their gym teacher. Sakura meets Rinne's grandmother Tamako, also a shinigami. Sakura travels into the underworld and wanders to the wheel of reincarnation. Rinne saves her before she gets on the wheel and Sakura finally remembers how Tamako was the shinigami she met in the past. Sakura learns how Rinne is actually of mixed human and shinigami heritage. Sakura takes home a hurt, black kitten which steals a meal and leads her to the old club building at school where she finds Rinne living. The black cat is named Rokumon and he forms a contract with Rinne to help him in his shinigami duties after Rinne's grandmother fired Rokumon. A second-year student at Sakura's school named Kaori Himekawa seeks help from Rinne for an ancient warrior who is haunting her dreams causing her to lose sleep over it.
02	October 16, 2009	978-4-0912-1774-5	January 19, 2010	978-1-4215-3486-2
009. "Nuptial Cups" (固めの盃, Katame no Sakazuki); 010. "Reunion" (再会, Saikai); 011. "Songstress of the Pool" (プールの歌姫, Pūru no Utahime); 012. "Something Lost" (無くしたもの, Nakushita Mono); 013. "Curse" (祟, Tatari); 014. "Duel at the Rabbit Hutch" (ウサギ小屋の対決, Usagigoya no Taiketsu); 015. "Spirit of No Return" (戻れない生霊, Modorenai Ikiryō); 016. "Welcome to Hell!" (ようこそ地獄へ!, Yōkoso Jigoku e!); 017. "Debt Hell" (借金地獄, Shakkin Jigoku); 018. "Stream of a Thousand Winds" (千の風気流(ストリーム), Sen no Kaze Sutorīmu)
Kaori agrees to perform a marriage ceremony with the warrior so he can pass on, but it does not work. Rinne suspects Kaori is not the warrior's reincarnated lover, and Rokumon takes Sakura to the underworld to buy a mirror where someone can see their previous incarnation in it. Kaori sees a sea turtle in the mirror, and Rinne takes the warrior around to find his real reincarnated lover, who turns out to be the current gym teacher at Sakura's school; after realizing this, the warrior promptly passes on. Sakura comes in contact with a girl named Misora Utagawa who died in the school pool but cannot remember her lingering attachment. Misora had been a popular girl in the choir club. Rinne ultimately figures out that Misora had lost her false tooth in the pool and died trying to find it; Rinne gives her another false tooth and Misora sings on last song before passing on. Sakura watches on day as a demon puts a curse on a boy's spirit named Reiji Todoriki, though he is not dead. The demon, named Masato, has an old grudge on Rinne and uses Reiji's spirit in a plan to get back at Rinne. Masato takes Reiji's soul to hell and Rinne pursues him, though in the process causing a large amount of damage to the surrounding area. However, Masato's plan backfires and he ends up paying for the damages. In the end, Reiji's soul is able to return to his body.
03	March 18, 2010	978-4-0912-2195-7	May 18, 2010	978-1-4215-3487-9
019. "The Transfer Student" (転校生, Tenkōsei); 020. "If You Don't Mind, Let's Be Friends First" (友だちからで良ければ, Tomodachi kara de Yokereba); 021. "A Fun Date" (楽しいデート, Tanoshii Dēto); 022. "One Hundred Thousand Yen" (10万円, Jūman'en); 023. "The Price of Power" (力の代償, Chikara no Daishō); 024. "Shinigami Scythe" (死神のカマ, Shinigami no Kama); 025. "Lure of the Pumpkinhead" (カボチャ頭の誘惑, Kabocha Atama no Yūwaku); 026. "Hall of the Damashigami" (だまし神の館, Damashigami no Yakata); 027. "Draw Me" (私を描いて, Watashi o Kaite); 028. "Black & White" (黒と白, Kuro to Shiro)
A transfer student, Tsubasa Jumonji, becomes a member of Sakura's class. Tsubasa had met Sakura when they were much younger and found out about her ability to see supernatural beings. Tsubasa, who had a crush on Sakura back then, asks Sakura to go out with him, but she just wants to be friends for now. Rinne helps a spirit by getting him a date with the girl he loves, though it eventually becomes a group date with Rinne, Sakura and Tsubasa also coming along to the amusement park. Everyone has fun on the date and the spirit is able to pass on peacefully. Rinne learns of a 100,000 yen bounty on an evil spirit and finds out the spirit of a little girl is in league with the evil spirit in order to attain power. In order to find the evil spirit, Rinne obtains a shinigami scythe for 5,000 yen and uses it to purify the evil spirit, which allows the little girl to pass on. The 100,000 yen reward, however, is immediately seized to pay for Rinne's debts. During the school festival, a damashigami (a shinigami that takes those who should not die to the afterlife) draws many girls to the afterlife, but Rinne follows the damashigami and defeats him. A female ghost with no face is terrorizing male art students at school, but turns out to be in fact a strong emotion which came to life. The source of the emotion is an unfinished drawing by the art club president, Suguru Egawa, of the previous president, Hitomi Egusa, and eventually he finishes the drawing with Hitomi's consent.
04	June 18, 2010	978-4-0912-2335-7	September 14, 2010	978-1-4215-3621-7
029. "Negative" (マイナス, Mainasu); 030. "President" (社長, Shachō); 031. "Damashigami Company" (堕魔死神カンパニー, Damashigami Kanpanī); 032. "Inauguration Ceremony" (就任式, Shūnin Shiki); 033. "Kyuketsukasha" (吸血火車, Kyūketsukasha); 034. "Handprint" (手形, Tegata); 035. "You Don't Disapprove of That?" (イヤじゃないのか, Iya ja Nai no ka); 036. "Ageha, The Shinigami" (死神 鳳, Shinigami Ageha); 037. "Sister's Whereabouts" (姉の行方, Ane no Yukue); 038. "Bride Screening" (花嫁審査, Hanayome Shinsa)
After Rokumon gives Rinne an afterlife strain of virus (which mortals cannot catch), damashigami come to attack Rinne. Later, Rokumon reports that Rinne's bank account is showing a negative value, followed by Rinne's father Sabato arriving to give Rinne a bunch of IOU; it was Sabato that took all of Rinne's money. Sabato, who runs an illegal damashigami company, wants Rinne to succeed him as president, and lures Rinne and his friends to the afterlife. Further, Sabato wants his son to marry one of the damashigami girls who are employed in the company. Rinne has a match with his father to decide his fate, ending ultimately in Rinne's victory with Sabato failing to get Rinne's handprint. Rinne's grandmother (and Sabato's mother) Tamako reveals herself after having dressed up as a seal to sneak in, officially ending the fight. They manage to get Rinne's money back, along with the forged bankbook and name seal Sabato used to withdraw Rinne's money. After another damashigami strikes at school, Rinne meets another shinigami named Ageha, who initially believe Rinne to be a damashigami. They defeat the damashigami and Rinne gets to keep all the reward money, as Ageha is only interested in defeating damashigami. Ageha comes to Rinne to ask for his help in tracking down her sister and he agrees after seeing a picture of her sister with his father. Ageha's sister comes to find Rinne to get him to marry Sakura and inherit the damashigami company and its debts, but Sakura says she and Rinne are just classmates.
05	September 17, 2010	978-4-0912-2526-9	March 8, 2011	978-1-4215-3622-4
039. "The Hot Secretary's True Identity" (美人秘書の正体, Bijin Hisho no Shōtai); 040. "Rich Girl" (お嬢様, Ojō-sama); 041. "Just a Simple Thanks" (あくまでお礼, Akumade Orei); 042. "Soul Eater King" (魂食王, Konjiki Ō); 043. "The Unopenable Bookshelves" (開かずの本棚, Akazuno Hondana); 044. "Roses and Soy Sauce" (薔薇と醤油, Bara to Shōyu); 045. "The Cursed Track Star" (呪われたエース, Norowareta Ēsu); 046. "I Don't Want Him to Know" (知らせたくない, Shirasetakunai); 047. "The Haunted Cedar" (おばけ杉, Obake Sugi); 048. "Yo-Yo Memories" (ヨーヨーの思い出, Yōyō no Omoide)
Ageha finds out her sister is romantically involved with Rinne's father and after he and Ageha's sister escape back to the underworld, Rinne and the others follow them. Ageha falls into several traps where she is tricked by damashigami into handing out large sums of money, but as she is rich, she does not mind. After Rinne saves Ageha from a demon that had a 1 million yen bounty, she begins to take a liking towards Rinne. Sakura believes Rinne and Ageha to be romantically involved, leaving Rinne to attempt to clear up the misunderstanding. Ageha makes him a large boxed lunch, but did not know the box contained an evil spirit named the Soul Eater King, which grants three wishes in exchange for a soul. Rinne sees through the evil spirit's intentions, however, and Ageha jumps in to defeat the spirit. Two bookshelves in the library will not open, because there is a dog guarding them. Rinne follows a rope on the dog to the owner, a spirit of a girl named Fumika who recently died. Fumika had written a love letter and placed it in a book the day she died. Once she recovers the letter and destroys it, she passes on. Riku Hayata is a star runner on the track team and is cursed with falling down on the track by the disembodied spirit of his senior on the team, Shu Kazami. Kazami recently sprained his ankle because of a banana peel accidentally left by Hayata on the track. Hayata's own disembodied spirit was feeling remorse for this, and Kazami's spirit was caused by Kazami being unable to tell Hayata about this; afterward, both spirits vanish. Sakura and Tsubasa visit a sacred tree at their old elementary school to dig up a power stone buried by Tsubasa years before. They find a vengeful spirit of a boy named Yota using the stone; Yota had been Sakura's classmate in elementary. Rinne destroys an evil spirit controlling Yota, who is able to retrieve Sakura's yo-yo, which Yota had stolen years before, because Sakura was more skillful with the yo-yo than him. Yota passes on after giving the yo-yo back to Sakura.
06	December 17, 2010	978-4-0912-2699-0	July 12, 2011	978-1-4215-4097-9
049. "The Power Stone's Curse" (聖石(パワーストーン)の呪い, Pawā Sutōn no Noroi); 050. "The Chain of Negativity" (負の連鎖, Fu no Rensa); 051. "Spirits" (精霊, Seirei); 052. "The Look-Alike Ghost" (同じ顔の幽霊, Onaji Kao no Yūrei); 053. "Love Song" (愛の歌, Ai no Uta); 054. "The Shinigami Clerk" (記死神, Shirushigami); 055. "Seizure" (差し押さえ, Sashiosae); 056. "Capital" (資本金, Shihonkin); 057. "Inside The Crate" (箱の中, Hako no Naka); 058. "The Ring of Judgment" (裁きの輪, Sabaki no Wa)
Masato goes to Tsubasa and gives him a book of devils so that he will use the cursed power stone to curse Rinne. Tsubasa unintentionally curses Rinne and bad things continue happening to him. Tsubasa eventually curses himself to save Rinne, and in doing so, purifies the stone with Rinne's help. Spirits come out of the stone and send Masato on his way. A ghost that looks like the student council president at Sakura's school, Yuki Naomi, goes around causing trouble. It turns out the ghost is the dead twin sister of Yuki's mother. After realizing she is dead, Ranko apologizes to Yuki (believing her to be her twin sister Rinko) and passes on. Ageha encounters a shinigami clerk, Kain, who is looking for the damashigami company run by Rinne's father. This leads Kain back to Rinne who decides to take Rinne's life to pay for his vast debt. Kain's mother had been swindled out of her money by Rinne's father. Kain takes Rinne's life flame and escapes to the underworld, where he is pursued by the others, including Rinne's spirit. Sakura finds a seal crate at Kain's mother's home addressed to Rinne. After opening it, he obtains the ring of judgment, a tool used by a shinigami that leads its owner to where an offender he or she is after. This takes Rinne and Sakura to the damashigami company and Rinne gets his life flame back.
07	March 18, 2011	978-4-0912-2798-0	November 8, 2011	978-1-421-54173-0
059. "The Summer Festival Mystery" (夏祭りの怪, Natsumatsuri no Kai); 060. "The Teddy Bear Memory" (クマちゃんの思い出, Kuma-chan no Omoide); 061. "Welcome To Nirvana House!" (涅槃家へようこそ!, Nehan'ya e Yōkoso!); 062. "The Spirit Way Stone" (霊道石, Reidōseki); 063. "The Voices from the Shrine" (祠の声, Hokora no Koe); 064. "Bakeneko" (化け猫); 065. "The House Where Ghosts Don't Tread" (霊の来ない家, Rei no Konai Ie); 066. "Expired" (期限切れ, Kigengire); 067. "The Horticulture Club Incident" (園芸部の異変, Engeibu no Ihen); 068. "How The Curse Was Cast" (呪いの方法, Noroi no Hōhō)
08	July 15, 2011	978-4-0912-3205-2	March 13, 2012	978-1-421-54316-1
069. "Homestay Training" (ホームステイ実習, Hōmusutei Jisshū); 070. "The Story Behind the Alligator Woman" (ワニ女の事情, Wani-onna no Jijō); 071. "Chibi's Memories" (チビの思い出, Chibi no Omoide); 072. "Introduction to an Evil Spirit" (悪霊紹介, Akuryō Shōkai); 073. "Supervisory Liability" (監督責任, Kantoku Sekinin); 074. "Party of Five, This Way" (五名様ご案内, Gomei-sama Goannai); 075. "The Friendly Square" (フレンドリースクエア, Furendorī Sukuea); 076. "The Curse of the Kitchen Counter" (呪いの調理台, Noroi no Chōridai); 077. "The Strangling Scarf" (首しめマフラー, Kubishime Mafurā); 078. "The Present" (プレゼント, Purezento)
09	October 18, 2011	978-4-0912-3339-4	July 3, 2012	978-1-421-54317-8
079. "Sleep, Exam Student" (眠れ受験生, Nemure Jukensei); 080. "I'll Be Waiting at the Rink" (リンクで待ってる, Rinku de Matteru); 081. "Extra Infusion" (補足注入, Hosoku Chūnyū); 082. "Within the Letter Box" (文箱の中, Fumibako no Naka); 083. "The Secret of the Numbers" (数字の秘密, Sūji no Himitsu); 084. "Ramen Kaedama" (ラーメンかえ魂, Rāmen Kaedama); 085. "Goal Fulfillment" (目標の達成, Mokuhyō no Tassei); 086. "The Wig's Regret" (カツラの無念, Katsura no Munen); 087. "Oboro's Revenge" (朧の復讐, Oboro no Fukushū); 088. "The Contract and the Mongoose" (契約書とマングース, Keiyakusho to Mangūsu)
10	November 18, 2011	978-4-0912-3450-6	November 13, 2012	978-1-421-54317-8
089. "A Black Cat's Life" (黒猫生命, Kuroneko Seimei); 090. "Partners" (パートナー, Pātonā); 091. "The Missing Bus Stop" (消えた停留所, Kieta Teiryūjo); 092. "The Digital Camera Ghost" (デジカメ幽霊, Dejikame Yūrei); 093. "Message" (メッセージ, Messēji); 094. "The Missing Dues" (消えた会費, Kieta Kaihi); 095. "The Price of Pride" (プライドの値段, Puraido no Nedan); 096. "The Dream Court" (夢のコート, Yume no Kōto); 097. "The Taboos of the Shinigami World" (死神界のタブー, Shinigamikai no Tabū); 098. "Poltergeist" (ポルターガイスト, Porutāgaisuto)
11	February 17, 2012	978-4-0912-3540-4	March 12, 2013	978-1-421-54981-1
099. "Blinding Candy" (見えないキャンディー, Mienai Kyandī); 100. "Target: Sakura" (ターゲットは桜, Tāgetto wa Sakura); 101. "Where'd Rinne Go?" (りんねはどこに?, Rinne wa Doko ni?); 102. "Puppy in the Rain" (雨の中の子犬, Ame no Naka no Koinu); 103. "The Poverty Moth" (貧乏蛾, Binbō Ga); 104. "The Envious Cat" (妬み猫, Netami Neko); 105. "Half-Off at the Haunted House!!" (お化け屋敷半額!!, Obakeyashiki Hangaku!!); 106. "It's Not a Date!" (デートではない!, Dēto de wa Nai!); 107. "Piping Hot" (アツアツ, Atsuatsu); 108. "The Lingering Watermelon" (さまようスイカ, Samayō Suika)
12	May 18, 2012	978-4-09-123657-9	July 9, 2013	978-1-421-55163-0
109. "The Attention-Grabbing Event" (注目のイベント, Chūmoku no Ibento); 110. "The Black Cat Ranking Exam" (黒猫段位テスト, Kuroneko Dan'i Tesuto); 111. "Battle at Cat Tower" (猫タワーの戦い, Neko Tawā no Tatakai); 112. "Let's Work Together!" (協力しよう!, Kyōryoku Shiyō!); 113. "Battle Royale" (バトルロイヤル, Batoru Roiyaru); 114. "Fearfully Outnumbered" (多勢に無勢, Tazei ni Buzei); 115. "The Cursed Straw Doll" (呪いのワラ人形, Noroi no Wara Ningyō); 116. "Let's Talk It Out" (ちゃんと話そう, Chanto Hanasō); 117. "The Wandering Power Stone" (さまよえるパワーストーン, Samayoeru Pawā Sutōn); 118. "The Matsutake Mushroom Commotion" (松茸の波紋, Matsutake no Hamon)
13	July 18, 2012	978-4-0912-3777-4	November 12, 2013	978-1-421-55379-5
119. "Would You Lend Me Some Money?" (お金♥貸して？, Okane ♥ Kashite?); 120. "When It Comes to Scythes, Come to the Crescent Moon Hall" (鎌の事なら三日月堂, Kama no Koto nara Mikazukidō); 121. "My Hansei" (我が半生, Waga Hansei); 122. "Care for Some Wax?" (ワックスどうどす, Wakkusu Dōdosu); 123. "Falsely Accused" (濡れ衣, Nureginu); 124. "The Tragedy of M" (M(エム)の悲劇, Emu no Higeki); 125. "The Dessert Spirit" (スイーツ霊, Suītsu Rei); 126. "The Tasty Tester" (旨味たっぷりモニター, Umami Tappuri Monitā); 127. "The Christmas Incident" (クリスマスの条件, Kurisumasu no Jōken); 128. "The Blank Prayer Plaque" (白紙絵馬, Hakushi Ema)
14	October 18, 2012	978-4-0912-3896-2	March 4, 2014	978-1-421-55617-8
129. "The Spirit on Dead-Tired Hill" (腰砕け坂の怪, Koshikudake-zaka no Kai); 130. "The Elder's Legacy" (長老の遺産, Chōrō no Isan); 131. "Demons & Setsubun" (鬼と節分, Oni to Setsubun); 132. "The 100-Year Curse Comes Due" (百年後の祟り, Hyakunengo no Tatari); 133. "The Fox Trap" (狐おとし, Kitsune Otoshi); 134. "The Mysterious Transfer Student" (謎の転校生, Nazo no Tenkōsei); 135. "The Truth Behind Renge" (れんげの正体, Renge no Shōtai); 136. "The One-Hundredth Soul" (百個めの魂, Hyakkome no Tamashii); 137. "Aiming for the Top" (トップを目指す, Toppu o Mezasu); 138. "The New Neighbor's Greeting" (引っ越しのご挨拶, Hikkoshi no Goaisatsu)
15	January 18, 2013	978-4-0912-4170-2	July 8, 2014	978-1-421-56644-3
139. "The Lucky Phone Charm" (お守りストラップ, Omamori Sutorappu); 140. "Evil Spirit Surge" (悪霊殺到, Akuryō Sattō); 141. "Princess Whispers" (囁姫, Sasayaki-hime); 142. "The Break-Up Set" (破局セット, Hakyoku Setto); 143. "The Fake Couple" (偽りのカップル, Itsuwari no Kappuru); 144. "The Break-Up God" (縁切り神, Enkiri-gami); 145. "Dislocated" (肩が重い, Kata ga Omoi); 146. "The Hunt and the Reunion" (追跡と再会, Tsuiseki to Saikai); 147. "Suspicion" (疑惑, Giwaku); 148. "Like You Always Were" (あの頃のまま..., Ano Koro no Mama...)
16	April 18, 2013	978-4-0912-4286-0	November 11, 2014	978-1-421-56645-0
149. "Recovery Cream" (リカバリークリーム, Rikabarī Kurīmu); 150. "The Dream of Sharing an Umbrella" (夢の相合い傘, Yume no Aiaigasa); 151. "The First Union Rally" (第一回組合大会, Daiikkai Kumiai Taikai); 152. "Lend a Right Hand" (右腕 貸します, Migiude Kashimasu); 153. "Fleeing for Their Lives" (逃げる人, Nigeru Hito); 154. "River of Treasures" (宝の川, Takara no Kawa); 155. "The Promised Necklace" (約束の首飾り, Yakusoku no Kubikazari); 156. "The Whereabouts of the Necklace" (首飾りの行方, Kubikazari no Yukue); 157. "One-Coin Investigation" (ワンコイン調査, Wan Koin Chōsa); 158. "The Devil at Camp" (キャンプ場の悪魔, Kyanpujō no Akuma)
17	June 18, 2013	978-4-0912-4322-5	March 10, 2015	978-1-421-57679-4
159. "Seven-Day-Long Love" (七日間の恋, Nanokakan no Koi); 160. "Infinite Grudge" (怨み無限大, Urami Mugendai); 161. "The Tatami Hands" (畳の手, Tatami no Te); 162. "The Cursed Cashbox" (呪金箱, Jukinbako); 163. "Open in Seven Days" (七日たったら開けること, Nanoka tattara Akeru Koto); 164. "The Evil Fourth Lane" (魔の４コース, Ma no 4 Kōsu); 165. "Pray to the Moon" (月に願いを, Tsuki ni Negai o)); 166. "The Mysterious Komainu" (謎の狛犬, Nazo no Komainu); 167. "The Perpetrator Appears!" (ご本人 登場！, Gohonnin Tōjō!); 168. "The Disembodied Soul's Wish" (生霊の願い, Ikiryō no Negai)
18	September 18, 2013	978-4-0912-4382-9	July 14, 2015	978-1-421-58092-0
169. "A Thousand Per Scoop Mushroom Hunt" (一攫千金キノコ狩り, Ikkaku Senkin Kinokogari); 170. "A Long Story" (長い話, Nagai Hanashi); 171. "Pot and Magistrate" (鍋と奉行, Nabe to Bugyō); 172. "Manneko and Coatomi" (マネ子とコト美, Maneko to Kotomi); 173. "Special Bonus" (特別ボーナス, Tokubetsu Bōnasu); 174. "Don't Want to Be Known" (知られたくない, Shiraretakunai); 175. "Memory Excavation" (思い出発掘, Omoide Hakkutsu); 176. "Sansei Kuroboshi" (黒星三世, Kuroboshi Sansei); 177. "Surprise on the Slopes" (ゲレンデのサプライズ, Gerennde no Supuraizu); 178. "Lockbox from Hell" (地獄の金庫, Jigoku no Kinko)
19	December 18, 2013	978-4-0912-4512-0	November 10, 2015	978-1-421-58093-7
179. "Black Cat Children's Meet" (黒猫こども会, Kuroneko Kodomo Kai); 180. "The Cursed Valentine" (呪われたバレンタイン, Norowareta Barentain); 181. "Type-A Demon, Type-B Shinigami" (悪魔A型 死神B型, Akuma A-gata Shinigami B-gata); 182. "Who Are You?!" (誰!?, Dare!?); 183. "Windfall Wax" (金運ワックス, Kin'un Wakkusu); 184. "At the Graduation Ceremony" (卒業式で, Sotsugyōshiki de); 185. "Forced Pawning" (強制質入れ, Kyōsei Shichiire); 186. "The Fearsome Outdoor Training" (恐怖の野外実習, Kyōfu no Yagai Jisshū); 187. "Forget Bead" (忘れ玉, Wasuredama); 188. "The Fancy Choker" (ファンシーなチョーカー, Fanshī na Chōkā)
20	March 18, 2014	978-4-0912-4549-6	March 8, 2016	978-1-421-58094-4
189. "The Wheel of Reincarnation Scrub Down" (輪廻の輪 一斎清掃, Rinne no Wa Issei Seisō); 190. "The Shop with No Customers" (客が来ない店, Kyaku ga Konai Mise); 191. "Bring a Date" (彼女を連れて, Kanojo o Tsurete); 192. "It's About the Money" (金なんだ, Kane nan da); 193. "Are You Too Good for It?" (惜しいのか, Oshii no ka); 194. "Sakura's Mood" (桜の機嫌, Sakura no Kigen); 195. "We're Not Going Out" (つきあってません, Tsukiattemasen); 196. "The Legendary Sacred Ashes" (伝説の聖灰, Densetsu no Seihai); 197. "From Within the Wall" (壁の中から…, Kabe no Naka kara...); 198. "All-You-Can-Eat Cherry Tomatoes" (プチトマト食べ放題, Puchi Tomato Tabehōdai)
21	May 16, 2014	978-4-0912-4630-1	July 12, 2016	978-1-421-58382-2
199. "Something's in the Tunnel" (トンネルに何かいる, Tonneru ni Nanika Iru); 200. "The Evil Spirit in the Summer Cottage" (別荘の悪霊, Bessō no Akuryō); 201. "Bug Soul Hunt" (虫魂採集, Chūkon Saishū); 202. "Eggplant Romance" (ナスロマン, Nasu Roman); 203. "The Red Somen" (赤いソーメン, Akai Sōmen); 204. "The Shopping Mall Lady" (ショッピングモールの姉, Shoppingu Mōru no Ane); 205. "Witch's Descendant" (魔女の末裔, Majo no Matsuei); 206. "First Test" (初めての試練, Hajimete no Shiren); 207. "The Mystery in the Flower Garden" (花畑の謎, Hanabatake no Nazo); 208. "Haunting Sounds" (音が追ってくる, Oto ga Ottekuru)
22	August 18, 2014	978-4-0912-5077-3	November 8, 2016	978-1-421-58383-9
209. "Loathsome Prediction" (いまわしき予言, Imawashiki Yogen); 210. "Tragic Ending" (悲劇的結末, Higekiteki Ketsumatsu); 211. "The Silver Scythe" (銀色のカマ, Gin'iro no Kama); 212. "Something Strange at the Children's Center" (児童館の異変, Jidōkan no Ihen); 213. "Rinne Under Suspicion" (疑われたりんね, Utagawareta Rinne); 214. "Square and Black Thing" (四角くて黒いやつ, Shikakukute Kuroi Yatsu); 215. "No Insides" (中身がない, Nakami ga Nai); 216. "Incubus Capturing Drill" (夢魔捕縛実習, Muma Hobaku Jisshū); 217. "Dreamlike World" (夢のような世界, Yume no Yō na Sekai); 218. "Santa's Grudge" (サンタの恨み, Santa no Urami)
23	November 18, 2014	978-4-0912-5370-5	March 14, 2017	978-1-421-58384-6
219. "Search Everywhere" (よくさがせ, Yoku Sagase); 220. "Good-Fortune Pot" (開運の壺, Kaiun no Tsubo); 221. "Hated" (嫌われました, Kirawaremashita); 222. "The Newspaper Arrives" (新聞が届く, Shinbun ga Todoku); 223. "Worry-Free Mask" (悩無しの面, Nōnashi no Men); 224. "Secluded Hot Springs Inn" (秘湯の宿, Hitō no Yado); 225. "Enjoy!" (楽しめ！, Tanoshime!); 226. "Food on the Veranda" (縁側のエサ, Engawa no Esa); 227. "What's Taking the Transfer So Long?!" (振込はまだか！, Furikomi wa Mada ka!); 228. "Springtime Evil-Spirit Hunt" (春の悪霊捕獲, Haru no Akuryō Hokaku)
24	March 18, 2015	978-4-0912-5680-5	July 11, 2017	978-1-421-59446-0
229. "Cursed Peeking Ball" (呪われたのぞき玉, Norowareta Nozokidama); 230. "The Key to Break the Curse" (呪いを解く鍵, Noroi o Toku Kagi); 231. "The White Magic Casket" (白魔法の小箱, Shiro Mahō no Kobako); 232. "Spot-Saving 1993" (場所取り１９９３, Bashotori 1993); 233. "The Rainbow-Colored Bamboo Shoot" (虹色のタケノコ, Nijiiro no Takenoko); 234. "Oihagizuki" (追萩月); 235. "Exorcism Crash Course–Lunch Included" (浄霊特訓弁当つき, Jōrei Tokkun Bentō-tsuki); 236. "Sakura vs. the Black Fox" (桜vs.黒ギツネ, Sakura vs Kurogitsune); 237. "Locker Legend" (ロッカー伝説, Rokkā Densetsu); 238. "Occult Elevator" (心霊エレベーター, Shinrei Erebētā)
25	April 17, 2015	978-4-0912-5799-4	November 14, 2017	978-1-421-59447-7
239. "June Bride" (ジューンブライド, Jūn Buraido); 240. "Below the Weather Hutch" (百葉箱の下, Hyakuyōbako no Shita); 241. "The Legendary Bible" (伝説の聖書, Densetsu no Seisho); 242. "Gold License" (ゴールドライセンス, Gōrudo Raisensu); 243. "Legitimate Means" (正当な手段, Seitō na Shudan); 244. "Earnest Fight" (本気の闘い, Honki no Tatakai); 245. "The Black Report Cards" (黒い通知表, Kuroi Tsūchihyō); 246. "The Expectant Ghost" (人待ち幽霊, Hitomachi Yūrei); 247. "Ghost in the Inflatable Raft" (幽霊ゴムボート, Yūrei Gomu Bōto); 248. "The Mystery Fireworks" (謎の花火, Nazo no Hanabi)
26	July 17, 2015	978-4-0912-6186-1	March 13, 2018	978-1-421-59760-7
249. "Campsite Vandalism" (キャンプ場荒らし, Kyanpujō Arashi); 250. "Ghost Story Time" (百物語, Hyakumonogatari); 251. "Eyeball Stalker" (目玉ストーカー, Medama Sutōkā); 252. "Wings of Blessing" (祝福の羽, Shukufuku no Hane); 253. "The Ring and the Stamp" (指輪と印鑑, Yubiwa to Inkan); 254. "Shinigami Killer" (死神殺し, Shinigami-goroshi); 255. "Careless Dead" (粗忽の死者, Sokotsu no Shisha); 256. "First Saury Festival" (第一回サンマ祭り, Daiikkai Sanma Matsuri); 257. "Special Protection Spirit Bird" (特別保護霊鳥, Tokubetsu Hogo Reichō); 258. "Neck Guy" (首男, Kubi Otoko)
27	September 18, 2015	978-4-0912-6279-0	July 10, 2018	978-1-421-59862-8
259. "Promise of the Underworld" (冥界の約束, Meikai no Yakusoku); 260. "No Turning Around" (振り向いてはいけない, Furimuite wa Ikenai); 261. "Screams on a Cassette Tape" (カセットテープの悲鳴, Kasetto Tēpu no Himei); 262. "Cold Room" (寒い部屋, Samui Heya); 263. "Crunching" (嚙み砕く, Kamikudaku); 264. "Decorations" (デコレーション, Dekorēshon); 265. "Until the Bell Is Rung" (鐘を撞くまで, Kane o Tsuku made); 266. "The Evil Spirit's Legacy" (悪霊の遺産, Akuryō no Isan); 267. "Monstrous Hint" (怪異のヒント, Kaii no Hinto); 268. "Rumor" (噂, Uwasa)
28	December 18, 2015	978-4-0912-6539-5	November 13, 2018	978-1-4215-9863-5
269. "Makeup Lessons on Wayward Dog Catching" (猛犬捕獲補習, Mōken Hokaku Hoshū); 270. "The Snowy Staircase" (雪の階段, Yuki no Kaidan); 271. "NAGARA" (NAGARA(ナガラ)); 272. "Apologize at the Family Altar" (仏間で謝れ, Butsuma de Ayamare); 273. "The Curse of Overspending" (散財の呪い, Sanzai no Noroi); 274. "Ashes and Yearning" (灰と憧れ, Hai to Akogare); 275. "Cinderella Date" (シンデレラデート, Shinderera Dēto); 276. "Please Charge Me" (チャージしてください, Chāji-shite Kudasai); 277. "The Fruits of Hard Work" (努力の結果, Doryoku no Kekka); 278. "Springtime Match" (春のお見合い, Haru no Omiai)
29	March 18, 2016	978-4-0912-6818-1	March 12, 2019	978-1-4215-9869-7
279. "Talking Mimi-chan" (お話しミミちゃん, Ohanashi Mimi-chan); 280. "Suzu Goes Missing" (鈴 行方不明, Suzu Yukue Fumei); 281. "The Black Cat Curse" (黒猫使役呪法, Kunoneko Shieki Juhō); 282. "Mother's Day Present" (母の日のプレゼント, Haha no Hi no Purezento); 283. "Mirror Man" (鏡男, Kagami Otoko); 284. "The Perfect Smile" (理想の笑顔, Risō no Egao); 285. "For 30,000 Yen" (三万円の先に, Sanman'en no Saki ni); 286. "Revenge" (ふくしゅう, Fukushū); 287. "Shinigami Prince" (死神王子, Shinigami Ōji); 288. "The Cursed Strip of Paper" (呪いの短冊, Noroi no Tanzaku)
30	April 18, 2016	978-4-09-127090-0	July 9, 2019	978-1-9747-0657-0
289. "The Goddess of Wisdom" (知恵の女神, Chie no Megami); 290. "The Bell of Love" (愛の鐘, Ai no Kane); 291. "Shortcut" (ショートカット, Shōto Katto); 292. "I Hate Braids" (おさげムカつく, Osage Muka-tsuku); 293. "Rehearsal" (シミュレーション, Shimyurēshon); 294. "The Girlfriend in the Ice" (氷の中の彼女, Kōri no Naka no Kanojo); 295. "The Teacher and the Balloons" (先生と風船, Sensei to Fūsen); 296. "Show Your Back" (背中を見せろ, Senaka o Misero); 297. "The Mask of Medusa" (メデューサの仮面, Medyūsa no Kamen); 298. "Turn to Stone!" (石になれ！, Ishi ni Nare!)
31	July 15, 2016	978-4-09-127315-4	November 12, 2019	978-1-9747-0659-4
299. "The Rusted Holy Sword" (錆びた聖剣, Sabita Seiken); 300. "Overgrown Hair" (髪がのびた, Kami ga Nobita); 301. "Renge's License" (れんげのライセンス, Renge no Raisensu); 302. "Number Tracking" (ナンバー追跡, Nanbā Tsuiseki); 303. "I Want to Believe" (信じたい, Shinjitai); 304. "I Want the Bouquet" (ブーケが欲しい, Būke ga Hoshii); 305. "The Witch's Coven" (魔女の集会, Majo no Shūkai); 306. "The Secret of the Coven" (集会の秘密, Shūkai no Himitsu); 307. "The Red Weather Hutch" (赤い百葉箱, Akai Hyakuyōbako); 308. "Have a Hot Water Bottle" (湯たんぽをどうぞ, Yutanpo o Dōzo)
32	September 16, 2016	978-4-09-127339-0	March 10, 2020	978-1-9747-0660-0
309. "Beautiful Windows" (美しい窓, Utsukushii Mado); 310. "Christmas Exorcism" (クリスマス浄霊会, Kurisumasu Jōreikai); 311. "The Black Hamaya" (黒い破魔矢, Kuroi Hamaya); 312. "I Want to Bite You" (嚙んであげたい, Kandeagetai); 313. "Otome's Scythe" (乙女のカマ, Otome no Kama); 314. "Something's Watching" (なにかが見ている, Nanika ga Miteiru); 315. "Otome's Memories" (乙女の記憶, Otome no Kioku); 316. "The Details of Her Disappearance" (失踪のいきさつ, Shissō no Ikisatsu); 317. "Truth and Lies!" (ウソと真実, Uso to Shinjitsu); 318. "The White Spirit" (白い霊, Shiroi Rei)
33	October 18, 2016	978-4-09-127410-6	May 12, 2020	978-1-9747-1492-6
319. "Kokkuri-san" (こっくりさん); 320. "The Cursed Book" (呪いの書, Noroi no Sho); 321. "Mystery at the Cat Cafe" (猫カフェの怪, Neko Kafe no Kai); 322. "The Above-Average Red" (非凡な赤, Hibon na Aka); 323. "The Haunted Film" (心霊フィルム, Shinrei Firumu); 324. "Money Spirit" (金霊, Kanedama); 325. "The Philosopher's Stone" (賢者の石, Kenja no Ishi); 326. "Kabakichi-kun" (カバ吉くん); 327. "The Couple Who Can't Meet" (会えない二人, Aenai Futari); 328. "Whistle and Detergent" (笛と洗剤, Fue to Senzai)
34	December 16, 2016	978-4-09-127424-3	July 14, 2020	978-1-9747-1714-9
329. "The Charm in the Ghost Shrine" (幽霊堂のお札, Yūreidō no Ofuda); 330. "The Blurred Memo" (にじんだメモ, Nijinda Memo); 331. "Kusakari-san" (草刈さん); 332. "Ageha Leaves Home" (鳳、家を出る, Ageha, Ie o Deru); 333. "A Pampered Life" (甘えた生活, Amaeta Seikatsu); 334. "The Back-Alley Shortcut" (路地の近道, Roji no Chikamichi); 335. "The Back Garden Gate" (庭の裏口, Niwa no Uraguchi); 336. "The Cursed Word" (呪いの言葉, Noroi no Kotoba); 337. "The Scene of the Adultery" (浮気の現場, Uwaki no Genba); 338. "Don't Come Near the Dock" (デッキに近づくな, Dekki ni Chikazuku na)
35	March 17, 2017	978-4-09-127507-3	September 8, 2020	978-1-9747-1765-1
339. "Sunflower Maze" (ひまわり迷路, Himawari Meiro); 340. "The Magic Sea Urchin Rice" (魔法のウニライス, Mahō no Uni Raisu); 341. "Festival Food Fiasco" (粉もんの悲劇, Konamon no Higeki); 342. "The Story of Horataro" (ホラ太郎のお話, Horatarō no Ohanashi); 343. "The Tree of Sin" (罪の木, Tsumi no Ki); 344. "The Price of Love" (愛の値段, Ai no Nedan); 345. "Inn of Memories" (思い出の宿, Omoide no Yado); 346. "The Friendship Master" (友情マスター, Yūjō Masutā); 347. "In the Image of Ebisu-sama" (恵比寿様風, Ebisu-sama Fū); 348. "Elementals Summoning" (精霊召喚, Seirei Shōkan)
36	May 18, 2017	978-4-09-127566-0	November 10, 2020	978-1-9747-1766-8
349. "The Missing Black Cats" (黒猫失踪, Kuroneko Shissō); 350. "The Mystery of the Secret Black Cat Convention" (黒猫秘密集会の謎, Kuroneko Himitsu Shūkai no Nazo); 351. "The Hidden Past of the Secret Black Cat Convention" (黒猫秘密集会の裏歴史, Kuroneko Himitsu Shūkai no Ura Rekishi); 352. "The Fruit from Hell" (地獄の果実, Jigoku no Kajitsu); 353. "Afraid of HOT" (HOT(ホット)が怖い, Hotto ga Kowai); 354. "I Wonder What'll Come Out" (何が出るかな？, Nani ga Deru ka na?); 355. "Inside the Tree" (ツリーの中に, Tsurī no Naka ni); 356. "The Lucky Fortune" (幸運のおみくじ, Kōun no Omikuji); 357. "Something in the House" (家にいるもの, Ie ni Iru Mono); 358. "How to Use a Brazier" (火鉢の使い方, Hibachi no Tsukaikata)
37	July 18, 2017	978-4-09-127666-7	January 12, 2021	978-1-9747-1887-0
359. "Downpour!" (雨降れ！, Amefure!); 360. "The Slightly Soiled Bill" (薄汚れた札, Usu Yogoreta Satsu); 361. "The Special Chocolate" (スペシャルなチョコ, Supesharu na Choko); 362. "The Stolen Puzzle Box" (盗まれたからくり箱, Nusumareta Karakuribako); 363. "I'll Return It" (お返しします, Okaeshi Shimasu); 364. "The Narrow Spirit Way" (狭小霊道, Kyōshō Reidō); 365. "I Couldn't Stop Thinking About It" (気になってました, Ki ni Nattemashita); 366. "Rolling Dog" (転がる犬, Korogaru Inu); 367. "Ayame's Resolve" (あやめの決意, Ayame no Ketsui); 368. "Cut the Chain" (鎖を切って, Kusari o Kitte)
38	September 15, 2017	978-4-09-127685-8	March 9, 2021	978-1-9747-1888-7
369. "I Am Not Afraid" (こわくありません, Kowaku Arimasen); 370. "Putting One's Affairs in Order" (身辺整理, Shinpen Seiri); 371. "The Telling Voice" (語る声, Kataru Koe); 372. "A New Friend" (新しい友達, Atarashii Tomodachi); 373. "Red Bride Church" (赤い花嫁教会, Akai Hanayome Kyōkai); 374. "This Is an Investment!" (これは投資だ！, Kore wa Tōshi da!); 375. "The Phoenix Scythe" (不死鳥のカマ, Fushichō no Kama); 376. "Crescent Moon Hall Forever" (三日月堂よ永遠に, Mikazukidō yo Towa ni); 377. "Something Fell in the Pool" (プールの落とし物, Pūru no Otoshimono); 378. "Dress from the Future" (未来のワンピース, Mirai no Wanpīsu)
39	November 17, 2017	978-4-09-127865-4	May 11, 2021	978-1-9747-2220-4
379. "Confession" (告白, Kokuhaku); 380. "Reversal of Fortune" (運命逆転, Unmei Gyakuten); 381. "The Witch's Summer Vacation" (魔女の夏休み, Majo no Natsuyasumi); 382. "Teacher's Future" (先生の未来, Sensei no Mirai); 383. "The Curse of Mammon" (マモンの呪い, Mamon no Noroi); 384. "Beautiful Home" (美しい家, Utsukushii Ie); 385. "The Beloved" (最愛の女(ひと), Saiai no Hito); 386. "I Don't Know Why" (何故だわからない, Naze da Wakaranai); 387. "Rapid Job Growth" (仕事運急上昇, Shigoto-un Kyūjōshō); 388. "The Shinigami Called Ageha" (鳳という死神, Ageha to iu Shinigami)
40	January 18, 2018	978-4-09-128074-9	July 13, 2021	978-1-9747-2221-1
389. "The Usual Feeling" (いつもの感じ, Itsumo no Kanji); 390. "Exorcism Exam" (浄霊検定, Jōrei Kentei); 391. "The Hanging Scroll's Trap" (掛け軸の罠, Kakejiku no Wana); 392. "Force of Habit" (日頃の行い, Higoro no Okonai); 393. "The Terrible Plan" (恐ろしい計画, Osoroshii Keikaku); 394. "Countercurrent" (逆流, Gyakuryū); 395. "The Other Boundary Stone" (もうひとつの境界石, Mō Hitotsu no Kyōkaiseki); 396. "Farewell, Rokudo-kun" (さよなら六道くん, Sayonara Rokudō-kun); 397. "The River Styx" (三途の川, Sanzu no Kawa); 398. "The Wheel of Reincarnation" (輪廻の輪, Rinne no Wa)
