= Warriors: Power of Three =

Third arc in the Warriors series

- The Sight (2007); Dark River (2007); Outcast (2008); Eclipse (2008); Long Shadows (2008); Sunrise (2009)
- Author: Erin Hunter
- Illustrator: Wayne McLoughlin
- Country: United Kingdom
- Language: English
- Genre: Juvenile; Fantasy
- Publisher: HarperCollins
- Published: 24 April 2007 — 21 April 2009
- Preceded by: Warriors: The New Prophecy
- Followed by: Warriors: Omen of the Stars

Warriors: Power of Three is the third arc in the Warriors juvenile fantasy novel series about anthropomorphic feral cats. The arc comprises six novels which were published from 2007 to 2009: The Sight, Dark River, Outcast, Eclipse, Long Shadows, and Sunrise. The novels are published by HarperCollins under the pseudonym Erin Hunter (see below). Power of Three follows the adventures of the grandchildren of first series protagonist Firestar: Jayfeather, Hollyleaf, and Lionblaze (initially known as Jaykit, Hollykit, and Lionkit). A prophecy predicts the three kits will have "the power of the stars in their paws".

The novels have appeared on the New York Times Bestseller List and have been nominated for several awards, although none of the novels in Warriors: Power of Three have won a significant literary award.

== Background ==
Warriors is written by Erin Hunter, a pen name for four people: Victoria Holmes, who creates the storyline and edits, and Kate Cary, Cherith Baldry, and Tui Sutherland, who write the books in turns. The Warriors series follows four Clans—ThunderClan, RiverClan, WindClan, and ShadowClan—of feral cats. The Clans believe in StarClan, a Clan made of the spirits of their ancestors. In a previous series, Warriors: The New Prophecy, the Tribe of Rushing Water was introduced. The Tribe, another group of wild cats, inhabits a mountain range and believes in their own set of ancestors, the Tribe of Endless Hunting.

- Jayfeather: Jayfeather, originally Jaykit and then Jaypaw, is a blind grey tabby tom with blue eyes, and the brother of Lionblaze and Hollyleaf. He is a medicine cat apprentice in ThunderClan. Jayfeather has a special power as foretold in a prophecy given to his grandfather Firestar: he can sense the emotions of other cats, and enter their dreams. Jayfeather is characterized as proud and sarcastic, especially when he feels other characters are judging him for his blindness.
- Hollyleaf: Hollyleaf, originally Hollykit and then Hollypaw, is a black she-cat with green eyes, and the sister of Lionblaze and Jayfeather. She is a warrior in ThunderClan. Hollyleaf is characterized as an ardent follower of the warrior code and tends to have an inflexible interpretation of the code.
- Lionblaze: Lionblaze, originally Lionkit and then Lionpaw, is a golden tabby tom, and the brother of Jayfeather and Hollyleaf. He is a warrior in ThunderClan. Lionblaze is especially talented in fighting skills and invincible against anyone he fights and, not knowing the Dark Forest's intentions, had received training from the spirits of deceased former antagonists and Dark Forest warriors Tigerstar and Hawkfrost.

=== Setting ===
In the Warriors universe, there are four Clans of feral cats that live in a forest: ThunderClan, RiverClan, WindClan, and ShadowClan. The Clans are structured, with different cats having different positions, including leader, deputy, warrior, medicine cat, apprentice, etc. Cats in each Clan live and hunt in their own territory, which they defend from other cats. Each Clan is adapted to its own types of prey and members usually possess (or are taught) special skills which suit the territory's terrain. StarClan is a group of the Clans' deceased ancestors who give spiritual guidance to the Clans. StarClan warriors keep watch over the Clans, usually watching the Clan they lived in while alive. They provide guidance to the Clans, often through dreams and other signs like omens.

==== Other ====
Beyond the Clans' territories lies a mountain range, inhabited by the Tribe of Rushing Water. The Tribe is shown to be similar to the Clans, yet it follows a different set of ancestors, the Tribe of Endless Hunting. The Tribe has a Healer, cave-guards, and prey-hunters, who each serve a different function in the Tribe. The Healer leads the Tribe, heals the ill and wounded, and communicates with the Tribe of Endless Hunting.

== Publication history ==
The Sight was published on 24 April 2007.

Dark River was first published in hardcover format on 26 December 2007, in the United States by HarperCollins. The UK published the novel on 1 March 2008. It was released in Canada on 13 December 2007. The book has been released in e-book format as well.

For Outcast, Victoria Holmes created the storyline and Cherith Baldry wrote the book. The title of the book was revealed during the third Erin Hunter online chat. An excerpt of Outcast was included in the back of its prequel, Dark River. To promote the book, the editor, Victoria Holmes, went on her third tour across the United States. The Canadian release of Outcast in hardback occurred on 9 April 2008. Outcast was released as a hardback in the United Kingdom and United States on 22 April 2008, and was published by HarperCollins. 200,000 copies of the book were initially released. It was made available as a paperback in Canada on 16 March 2009.

Eclipse was released on 2 September 2008.

Long Shadows was published on 25 November 2008. It has sold over 250,000 copies.

Sunrise was published on 21 April 2009.

=== Foreign language editions ===
Outcast was published in French as Exil by Univers Poche on 18 October 2012, in German as Verbannt by Beltz & Gelberg on 28 January 2013, and in Japanese in October 2012. Outcast was released in Chinese in 2009, along with a trading card featuring Lionpaw.

== Synopsis ==
=== The Sight ===
The Sight opens with a prologue set near the conclusion of Firestar's Quest: Firestar is told a prophecy that "There will be three, kin of your kin, who hold the power of the stars in their paws". The remainder of the novel then takes place several months following the events of Sunset, and centres around Firestar's grandchildren. Hollypaw is training to become ThunderClan's medicine cat, while her brothers Lionpaw and Jaypaw are training to become warriors. Jaypaw is born congenitally blind and is trained by Brightheart, a ThunderClan warrior who herself has only has one eye following an injury; however, Jaypaw is frustrated that others see his blindness as a weakness.

During a battle with neighbouring ShadowClan, however, Jaypaw is only able to defeat an enemy apprentice with his siblings compensating for his blindness by telling him where his opponent is. Meanwhile, Hollypaw discovers she enjoys battling as a warrior better than her duties as a medicine cat apprentice. Jaypaw then has a dream in which StarClan, the spirits of the Clans' ancestors, tell him that he must become a medicine cat instead of a warrior, because of his unique gift: although he is blind in the real world, Jaypaw is able to sense other cats' emotions, and enter their dreams, at which time, he is able to see. As a result, Hollypaw and Jaypaw trade roles, with Jaypaw becoming medicine cat apprentice, and Hollypaw beginning training as a warrior.

At the next monthly Gathering of all four Clans, a dispute breaks out between the Clans. To repair the relationships between the Clans, ThunderClan warrior Squirrelflight suggests holding a unique one-time event to have each Clan's apprentices compete in a variety of competitions, such as tree climbing, hunting, and fighting. Jaypaw is upset that he cannot compete, but while remaining behind at ThunderClan camp, he has a vision in which he is choking on earth and smells badger and fox. Realizing that he is having a premonition from the perspective of his brother Lionpaw, Jaypaw is able to arrive and alert others in time to help save Lionpaw and WindClan apprentice Breezepaw, who fall into a collapsing badger set during a competition. The event concludes with each Clan having won at something, and the Clan leaders declare there is no overall winner.

At the end of the novel, Jaypaw enter's Firestar's dream and hears the prophecy from the prologue, "There will be three, kin of your kin, who hold the power of the stars in their paws"; Jaypaw realizes that the prophecy refers to himself and his siblings, as they are Firestar's grandchildren, and thus kin of his kin.

=== Dark River ===
Dark River
- Author: Erin Hunter
- Cover artist: Wayne McLoughlin
- Language: English
- Series: Warriors: The Power of Three
- Genre: Children's literature Fantasy novel
- Publisher: HarperCollins
- Publication date: 26 December 2007
- Publication place: United States
- Media type: Print (hardback and paperback)
- Pages: 322
- ISBN: 978-0-06-089205-0
- Preceded by: The Sight
- Followed by: Outcast

In Dark River's prologue, it is revealed that there are tunnels beneath the moorland that make up WindClan territory. Fallen Leaves, a cat previously unknown to readers, enters a tunnel, meeting an old cat named Rock, who explains to him that to become a "sharpclaw", he must find a way out of the tunnels and onto the moor. However, when Rock asks Fallen Leaves if it will rain, Fallen Leaves lies and says no despite knowing it will rain, as he worries that Rock will otherwise ask him to wait until another day. Fallen Leaves then enters the tunnels and is trapped when it does rain; he drowns.

Following the events of The Sight, Lionpaw befriends WindClan apprentice Heatherpaw; despite friendships between cats from different Clans being forbidden by the warrior code, the two begin meeting at night in the tunnels beneath WindClan's territory, which are otherwise unknown to other Clan cats. The spirit of the deceased antagonist Tigerstar, begins visiting his grandson Lionpaw in his dreams like he did with his sons Hawkfrost and Brambleclaw. Tigerstar is now accompanied by Hawkfrost, who had died during the events of Sunset following his thwarted assassination attempt on Firestar. They begin teaching Lionpaw advanced battle moves, but when Lionpaw starts to teach the moves to Heatherpaw, Hawkfrost scolds him for showing battle moves to the enemy. Lionpaw is forced to choose between his love of Heatherpaw and his loyalty to the warrior code and ThunderClan. He ultimately chooses to remain loyal to his Clan and leaves Heatherpaw, who is extremely hurt and betrayed afterward.

ThunderClan medicine cat apprentice Jaypaw finds a stick with odd scratch marks on it: some that are crossed out and some that are not. As he attempts to understand their meaning, he has a dream in which he experiences Fallen Leaves' experience in the prologue. Jaypaw then understands that the scratches represent ancient cats who undertook the trial in the tunnels and that the last uncrossed one represented Fallen Leaves, indicating that he did not emerge.

Jaypaw and his mentor Leafpool are tasked by Firestar to deliver a message to WindClan leader Onestar; upon arrival, they discover that WindClan is threatening to attack RiverClan, whom they accuse of being behind the disappearance of three WindClan kits; WindClan is demanding the kits' return. Jaypaw and Leafpool return to ThunderClan camp, and Lionpaw tells his brother and sister about the tunnels, where he thinks the kits may have gone. They enter the tunnels, coincidentally meeting up with WindClan apprentices Breezepaw and Heatherpaw, who share their motive for being there. Jaypaw is guided by the spirit of Fallen Leaves and the group finds the kits. The tunnels begin to flood as it starts to rain, but Fallen Leaves assists Jaypaw in guiding the group to safety; they return the kits to WindClan and avert a battle between WindClan and RiverClan.

=== Outcast ===
Outcast
- Author: Erin Hunter
- Cover artist: Wayne McLoughlin
- Language: English
- Series: Warriors: Power of Three
- Genre: Children's literature Fantasy novel
- Publisher: HarperCollins
- Publication date: 9 April 2008 (Canada); 22 April 2008 (United States and United Kingdom)
- Publication place: Canada; United States; United Kingdom
- Media type: Print (hardback and paperback)
- Pages: 317 (first edition)
- ISBN: 978-0-06-089208-1
- OCLC: 179807183
- LC Class: PZ7.H916625Ou 2008
- Preceded by: Dark River
- Followed by: Eclipse

Two cats from a group in the mountains called the Tribe of Rushing Water arrive in ThunderClan's camp to ask for ThunderClan's help in dealing with a group of rogue cats who are relentlessly harassing the Tribe and stealing their prey. Upon hearing this news, Stormfur and Brook Where Small Fish Swim (Brook) reveal why they had returned to ThunderClan from the Tribe in Twilight. The two were banished after Stormfur led the Tribe into battle against the rogues: many Tribe cats died due to a lack of battle experience, and Stormfur was blamed for the casualties. Brambleclaw, Squirrelflight, Jaypaw, Hollypaw, and Lionpaw of ThunderClan, Tawnypelt of ShadowClan, Crowfeather and Breezepaw of WindClan, as well as Stormfur and Brook, journey to the mountains to help the Tribe resolve their conflict with the rogues. The Clan cats attempt to reason with the rogues and mark borders, but the rogues ignore the borders, forcing the Tribe to take more drastic measures. The Clan cats proceed to teach the Tribe cats fighting skills. The Tribe is reluctant to fight at first, but manages to defeat the invaders, who accept defeat and promise to leave the Tribe alone. At the conclusion of Outcast, Jaypaw decides to tell his brother and sister about the prophecy "There will be three, kin of your kin, who hold the powers of the stars in their paws", which he had kept secret since discovering it in The Sight.

=== Eclipse ===
Following their success in Outcast, the group of cats who made the journey to the Tribe of Rushing Water return to the Clans. Shortly after their return, a loner cat named Sol arrives on ThunderClan territory and informs Jaypaw and Leafpool that the sun will disappear.

That night, Lionpaw discovers WindClan warriors invading the ThunderClan camp; following a brief battle, Onestar accuses ThunderClan of not following the warrior code, and the WindClan cats leave the camp, only to ambush the ThunderClan patrols sent to ensure they leave ThunderClan territory. As ThunderClan is losing the battle, Hollypaw is instructed to seek help from ShadowClan, while WindClan gains the assistance of RiverClan. With all four Clans fighting, the sun suddenly "disappears" in an eclipse; all four Clans stop fighting out of fear.

Jaypaw convinces Lionpaw and Hollypaw that they need to find and speak to Sol, since he had predicted the sun's disappearance. After speaking to them, Sol then departs to stay with ShadowClan. At the next Gathering, Sol and Blackstar arrive together and Blackstar announces that he has lost faith in StarClan and ShadowClan will no longer attend Gatherings.

At the end of the book, Hollypaw and Lionpaw receive their warrior names, Hollyleaf and Lionblaze.

=== Long Shadows ===
When Sol persuades almost all of ShadowClan to give up belief in StarClan, Tawnypelt takes her kits Flamepaw, Tigerpaw, and Dawnpaw to ThunderClan, hoping to find refuge there, stating that she and her kits do not want to be part of a Clan that does not believe in StarClan. In hopes of helping ShadowClan regain their faith in their ancestors, the spirits of former ShadowClan leader Raggedstar and former ShadowClan medicine cat Runningnose beg Jaypaw for assistance. Jaypaw, along with Tigerpaw, Flamepaw, Dawnpaw, Hollyleaf, and Lionblaze, create a fake sign from StarClan to show Blackstar that StarClan is real. Blackstar remains unconvinced until the fake sign becomes real, when the spirits of Raggedstar and Runningnose appear and tell Blackstar to send Sol away, and to regain his faith in StarClan. Blackstar is convinced and relays this message to his Clan. Tawnypelt and her kits then return to ShadowClan.

An outbreak of greencough, a respiratory infection, begins in ThunderClan, but the Clan is short on supply of catmint, the treatment for greencough. ThunderClan's supply had been trampled during the battle during the events of Eclipse. Jaypaw has a dream telling him where there is a fresh supply: on WindClan territory. Jaypaw asks Lionblaze to steal the catmint from WindClan territory. Lionblaze initially refuses, afraid he will encounter Heatherpaw, whom he blames for WindClan's use of the tunnels during the attack in Eclipse, because he has been having dreams where he kills her. However, as the greencough gets worse, he relents. Lionblaze successfully retrieves the catmint, although he does have a tense encounter with Heatherpaw, now called Heathertail, in the process; however, he does not kill her as he does in his dreams. With the Clan's recovery from the greencough outbreak, Jaypaw is recognized for helping find the catmint, and finally receives his full medicine cat name, Jayfeather.

Then, during a storm, the camp is struck by lightning and catches fire. Jayfeather, Lionblaze, Hollyleaf, and their mother Squirrelflight are trapped by the fire. Squirrelflight eventually makes it through the flames, and attempts to position a fallen branch through the flames to provide an escape route for the three. ThunderClan warrior Ashfur arrives and assists her, only to then block the way out. Ashfur tells Squirrelflight that he never forgave her after she ended their relationship and returned to her relationship with Brambleclaw. He reveals that he participated in Hawkfrost's attempt to assassinate Firestar and that he will now kill Squirrelflight's kits in another attempt to hurt her in revenge. Squirrelflight reveals then that he cannot hurt her that way because they are not her kits. She explains how she kept the secret from Brambleclaw and the whole of ThunderClan. Ashfur allows the three to escape the fire to safety, but threatens to reveal Squirreflight's secret in order to exact his revenge. With this revelation, Jayfeather, Hollyleaf and Lionblaze question their belief that they are "the Three" mentioned in the prophecy, since their supposed kinship with Firestar was because Squirrelflight is Firestar's daughter.

The fire burns out and ThunderClan returns to and rebuilds their camp. Three days before the Gathering, Ashfur requests Firestar's permission to attend. Hollyleaf, Lionblaze, Jayfeather, and Squirrelflight worry that he plans to reveal Squirrelflight's secret publicly to all four Clans at the Gathering. In the days leading up to the Gathering, the three warn Ashfur that he will regret it if he reveals the secret. Although he is frightened, he insists he will follow through with his plan. Immediately prior to the Gathering, the patrol of warriors going notices that both Ashfur and Squirrelflight are missing. On the way to the Gathering, they discover Ashfur's body lying in the stream marking the border between ThunderClan and WindClan territories, as if he had drowned. They take his body back to camp so they can sit vigil for him, as is Clan tradition, but Leafpool notices a slit in his neck, suggesting he was murdered. Firestar announces that Ashfur appears to have been murdered, and raises the possibility he was murdered by a cat from ThunderClan, as no other Clans' scents were found on his body. The three vow to keep the recent events involving them, Squirrelflight, and Ashfur a secret.

=== Sunrise ===
Sunrise begins with Leafpool preparing Ashfur's body for burial; in the process, she discovers a tuft of fur in Ashfur's claws, presumably from his murderer, and she knows whose it is, although she does not share this with the rest of the Clan. ThunderClan discusses Ashfur's murder, and many think that a WindClan cat killed him since he was found on the WindClan border. To find out, Firestar sends a patrol to WindClan, but Onestar vehemently denies the possibility. As the patrol leaves, Ashfoot tells ThunderClan that she sighted Sol near the location of Ashfur's dead body, raising the possibility that Sol killed Ashfur. Firestar sends Birchfall, Brambleclaw, Brackenfur, Hazeltail, Hollyleaf, and Lionblaze to the sun-drown-place (ocean) to find Sol. The patrol finds Sol and brings him back to ThunderClan camp; Sol neither confirms nor denies killing Ashfur and is kept under guard in the camp.

Jayfeather attempts to discover the true identity of his parents. ThunderClan elder Mousefur recalls that Leafpool accidentally gave her a strange herb soon after Jayfeather's birth, and notices it now on Jayfeather's pelt. Jayfeather does not recognize the herb, and asks ShadowClan medicine cat Littlecloud when the medicine cats next attend their regular meeting at the Moonpool. The ShadowClan medicine cat recognizes it as parsley, a herb used to suppress lactation in cats whose kits die. Jayfeather remembers that while returning to camp after birth, there was another cat with him besides Squirrelflight: he realizes that their mother is actually Leafpool. Their father's identity is then revealed to Jayfeather by the spirit of former ThunderClan medicine cat Yellowfang, when she leaves him a crows' feather as a sign, indicating that their father is Crowfeather of WindClan.

Meanwhile, at ThunderClan camp, Hollyleaf too realizes that her mother is Leafpool when she learns that Leafpool had also returned to camp with Squirrelflight the day Hollyleaf and her littermates were born. When confronted by Hollyleaf, Leafpool reveals to Hollyleaf that she knows that Hollyleaf killed Ashfur, having recognized the tuft of fur found in Ashfur's claws.

At the next Gathering, Hollyleaf reveals the secret about her and her brothers' parents. Crowfeather denies being their father, while his son Breezepelt and mate Nightcloud are both outraged about never being informed. Brambleclaw is heartbroken by Squirrelflight's deception and ends their relationship, much to Squirreflight's distraught. Hollyleaf confronts Leafpool and attempts to kill her by forcing her to eat poisonous deathberries (yew berries), but does not follow through when Leafpool does not resist, noting that she has already lost everything as a result of this revelation: she is now rejected by Crowfeather, her kits, and has lost her position as ThunderClan's medicine cat, as medicine cats are forbidden from having a mate. Distraught with the negative reactions to her announcement, Hollyleaf flees into the tunnels below WindClan's territories, which collapse on her. She is presumed dead by the Clans.

With the revelation that they are still kin of Firestar's kin, since Leafpool is Firestar's other daughter, and the presumed death of Hollyleaf, Jayfeather concludes that only he and Lionblaze are part of the prophecy's Three, and that one of Whitewing's kits will be the third cat in the prophecy, being the granddaughter of Firestar's nephew Cloudtail.

== Critical reception ==
The Sight quickly mounted #1 on the New York Times Bestseller List. It was recommended as Children's Summer reading by the Washington Post Children's Book Club. Booklist gave a positive review saying, "As in previous books, personal tensions are juxtaposed against dangers from the outside. Plenty of action and solid characterizations make this an enticing choice for fans of the long-running enterprise." The Sight was nominated as the best Middle Readers book at Amazon's Best Books of the Year (2007), and placed sixth out of the ten nominees, with six percent of the total votes.

A reviewer writing for Children's Literature criticized Outcast for its "overwhelming confusion" of characters and references to past events in the series that readers who had not read earlier books in the series would not understand.
