= Warriors: The New Prophecy =

Second arc in the Warriors series

- Midnight (2005); Moonrise (2005); Dawn (2005); Starlight (2006); Twilight (2006); Sunset (2006)
- Author: Erin Hunter
- Illustrator: Wayne McLoughlin
- Country: United Kingdom/United States/Canada
- Language: English
- Genre: Children's literature Fantasy
- Publisher: HarperCollins
- Published: 10 May 2005 – 26 December 2006
- Preceded by: Warriors: The Prophecies Begin
- Followed by: Warriors: Power of Three

Warriors: The New Prophecy is the second arc in the Warriors juvenile fantasy novel series about cats, who live in four established clans and follow a code to keep the peace between them from breaking apart completely. The arc comprises six novels which were published from 2005 to 2006: Midnight, Moonrise, Dawn, Starlight, Twilight, and Sunset. The novels are published by HarperCollins under the pseudonym Erin Hunter, which refers to authors Kate Cary and Cherith Baldry and plot developer/editor Victoria Holmes. The New Prophecy details the Clans' journey to a new home when humans (called Twolegs by the Clans) destroy their original territories. The arc's major themes deal with forbidden love, the concept of nature versus nurture, and characters being a mix of good and bad. Though the novels have appeared on the New York Times Bestseller List and have been nominated for several awards, none of the novels in Warriors: The New Prophecy has won a significant literary award.

== Pseudonym ==
The series was written by Erin Hunter, a pseudonym used by authors Cherith Baldry, Kate Cary, Tui Sutherland, and series editor Victoria Holmes. The pseudonym is used so that the individual novels in the series would not be shelved in different places in libraries. Victoria Holmes chose the name Erin because she liked the name, and Hunter because it matched the theme of feral cats. It also ensured that the books were shelved near those of Brian Jacques, an author that the writers, collectively known as "the Erins", liked.

== Inspiration and influences ==
The authors of the series drew inspiration from several natural locations in the United Kingdom. The four Clans (WindClan, RiverClan, ThunderClan, and ShadowClan) share a fictional forest based on England's New Forest. Loch Lomond is another location that influenced the setting. The herbs that the cats use for healing is based on information found in Nicholas Culpeper's Complete Herbal. Some other sources of inspiration for the series include the works of authors such as J. R. R. Tolkien and C. S. Lewis.

Cherith Baldry, one of the people who write using the pen name Erin Hunter, said that it was sad and hard to write the death of Feathertail at the end of Moonrise because they had to present it in a way suitable for the book's younger target audience.

The series is written in an alternating third-person limited narrative.

== Publication history ==
Midnight was first released in the US and Canada in hardcover on 10 May 2005. It was released in the UK on 25 October 2006. It was released in paperback on 4 April 2006. It was also released for the Amazon Kindle on 6 November 2007.

Moonrise was published as a hardcover by HarperCollins on 25 July 2005 in Canada, and 2 August 2005 in the US and UK. The book was released as a paperback on 25 July 2006, and as an e-book on 6 November 2007.

Dawn was first published as a hardcover on 27 December 2005 in the US. The e-book version was released about a year later on 6 November 2007 and the paperback version was released on 14 November 2006. In the UK, the hardcover was released on 1 January 2006, a few days after the US version came out. The paperback version was released eleven months later on 1 December 2006. The Canadian version was released by Tween Publishing on 2 November 2006. Dawn was released as a hardcover in Australia at the same time as America on 27 December 2005. Similarly, the paperback and e-book version were released on the same day as the US, 14 November 2006 for the paperback and 6 November 2007 for the e-book.

Starlight was released on 4 April 2006, in hardcover. It has been released as a paperback. It was also the first of the Warriors series to be released as an audiobook.

Sunset was released as a hardcover in the US and UK on 12 December 2006. The paperback version was released about a year later on 25 September 2007. Sunset has also been released in CD audiobook and e-book format. The audiobook was read by Nanette Savard, whose performance was praised by a reviewer for AudioFile, who stated: "Nanette Savard brings out the youth of the cats who are struggling to help their clan survive and to protect each other from outside danger". The book was also re-released in the UK on 29 September 2011, with new cover art.

=== Setting and characters ===
Warriors: The New Prophecy takes place in several locations inspired by similar locales in the United Kingdom. With the exception of a disused mine, the forest in which the cats live is based largely on the New Forest. In addition, parts of the story take place by the ocean and in a fictitious mountain range. There is also a lake and its surrounding areas which become the Clans; new home.

The main characters each come from one of four Clans: ThunderClan, RiverClan, ShadowClan, and WindClan. All Clan cats share a belief in StarClan, a group of spirits usually represented by the stars, who are their ancestors and provide them with guidance. The Clans also follow identical hierarchy structures: Clans each have one leader, a deputy who is second-in-command, and a medicine cat who heals Clanmates in addition to communicating with StarClan. The bulk of each Clan consists of warriors, who carry out hunting for food, patrol borders, and fight battles when they occur. Apprentices are younger cats who are in training to become warriors, or more rarely, medicine cats.

== Synopsis ==
=== Midnight ===
Four seasons, or a year, have passed since the previous book, The Darkest Hour. Firestar, the new leader of ThunderClan, has had two kittens with Sandstorm, named Squirrelpaw and Leafpaw. Squirrelpaw is apprenticed to Dustpelt, and Leafpaw is apprenticed to Cinderpelt, to train to become the next medicine cat of ThunderClan. While Leafpaw and Cinderpelt search for herbs, StarClan, the cats' ancestors, sends Cinderpelt an ominous warning in some burning bracken, a picture of a tiger running through fire, which she interprets to mean that fire and tiger will destroy the forest. Cinderpelt concludes that the warning must be about Squirrelpaw and Brambleclaw, the daughter of Firestar and the son of Tigerstar, respectively. They share the warning with Firestar, who later decides to keep Brambleclaw and Squirrelpaw separated.

In a dream, StarClan tells Brambleclaw, Feathertail (Graystripe's daughter), Crowpaw, and Tawnypelt (formerly Tawnypaw, Brambleclaw's sister) to listen to what "midnight" has to say. Eventually, they begin a journey in the direction of the setting sun. Squirrelpaw tags along and Stormfur insists on accompanying them to protect his sister, Feathertail, as the six cats trek into the unknown world. On their journey, they meet an old loner named Purdy who helps the Clan cats get to the sun-drown place (ocean). Eventually, they reach the sun-drown-place and enter a cavern inhabited by a highly intelligent badger known as Midnight, who reveals to them that humans will destroy the forest and that the cats must either leave the forest or die. She also tells them that a dying warrior will lead the Clans to their new home.

=== Moonrise ===
On the return journey from their quest in Midnight, the Clan cats decide, after consultation with Midnight, to go through a mountain range which they had avoided in their initial travels. There, they meet a Clan-like group of cats called the Tribe of Rushing Water, who have their own set of ancestors: the Tribe of Endless Hunting. The Tribe takes the traveling cats in and gives them food and shelter. The Clan cats discover that the Tribe cats have a prophecy: a silver cat will save them from Sharptooth, a savage cougar that has been killing many members of the Tribe. The Tribe thinks that Stormfur is the silver cat from the prophecy, and he is therefore expected to protect the Tribe from Sharptooth.

Together, the Clan cats succeed in leading Sharptooth into a trap in a cave. However, their plan to poison Sharptooth goes awry, and Feathertail jumps up to the roof of the cave onto a stalactite, causing it to fall. Both Feathertail and Sharptooth are killed by the impact. The Tribe then realizes that Feathertail was the silver cat in their prophecy, not her brother Stormfur, as they had previously thought. The five remaining cats then continue their journey. The book ends with Squirrelpaw noticing Highstones, which is at the edge of WindClan territory; they are almost home.

Meanwhile, back in the forest, the Clans begin to experience the effects of the humans' intrusion into their territories, including lost and poisoned prey, destruction of the forest and cats being abducted.

=== Dawn ===
Brambleclaw, Squirrelpaw, Crowpaw, Stormfur and Tawnypelt return to the Clans from a quest with a message: the Clans must move to a new home, or risk death. The destruction of the forest has already begun, with the Clans starving as the food supply has been cut off and their habitat destroyed by the humans building a new road. At the same time, cats are being taken away by humans, including a ThunderClan apprentice, Leafpaw. A patrol is sent to rescue the captured cats, but Graystripe is captured after he succeeds in rescuing Leafpaw and other cats from RiverClan and WindClan, as well as many non-Clan cats.

It is difficult for Firestar, ThunderClan's leader, to convince ShadowClan and RiverClan to leave. ShadowClan finally agrees to leave when a tree cut down by humans falls in their camp. Midnight, an intelligent badger from the previous book, had told the questing cats that a "dying warrior" will show the Clans the way to their new home. The dying warrior turns out to be the spirit of Mudfur, the RiverClan medicine cat who died earlier. As the Clans' spiritual ancestors are represented by the star, Mudfur "runs" though the night sky as a shooting star and drops behind the mountains, showing the new territory will be beyond the mountains. The Clans travel together through the mountains, guided by Brambleclaw, Squirrelpaw, Crowpaw, Tawnypelt, and Stormfur.

While in the mountains, the Clans meet the Tribe of Rushing Water and Stormfur chooses to stay with the Tribe with Brook Where Small Fish Swim, whom he has fallen in love with, and his sister, Feathertail's, spirit. At the end of the book, the Clans discover a forest around a lake that reflects all of the stars.

=== Starlight ===
The four Clans of warrior cats, ThunderClan, ShadowClan, RiverClan and WindClan, discover a lake which serves as their new home, replacing their old home which is destroyed by humans. During a meeting, Firestar, leader of ThunderClan, calls up Squirrelpaw, his daughter who is an apprentice, and promotes her to the status of warrior, giving her the warrior name Squirrelflight. The next day, the leaders call upon the four remaining cats that go on the journey to the sun-drown-place in Midnight, Brambleclaw, Squirrelflight, Crowfeather, and Tawnypelt, as well as Mistyfoot of RiverClan to explore around the lake and find camps for each Clan.

The cats come across a location that seems ideal for RiverClan's fishing lifestyle. Continuing on, they find a coniferous forest which seems to suit ShadowClan. Desperate to prove herself by finding ThunderClan a camp, Squirrelflight runs ahead and accidentally falls down a large circular stone hollow. She recovers and realizes that it is a perfect place for a well-sheltered ThunderClan camp. The cats later cross a moorland which Crowfeather thinks suits WindClan's lifestyle of chasing rabbits. The Clans decide to leave for their new camps the next day.

After the Clans move into their new camps, Barkface, the WindClan medicine cat, goes to Firestar and tells him that Tallstar, leader of WindClan, is dying. Firestar asks Brambleclaw to follow him as well as Onewhisker of WindClan, at Tallstar's request. Tallstar tells them that he does not wish for Mudclaw, the WindClan deputy, to lead WindClan, and wishes to switch to Onewhisker as deputy. He dies soon after telling the cats. The next morning, Firestar and Onewhisker announce this to the other Clans, much to Mudclaw's anger. Onewhisker appoints Ashfoot as his deputy, although he has not yet received his nine lives and leader name from StarClan, the cats' ancestors. The medicine cats worry about whether there is another Moonstone (a sacred stone in the old territory which they can communicate with StarClan, their warrior ancestors) for Onewhisker to visit for his leadership ceremony.

During Gatherings and times when the Clans are together, Brambleclaw spends more time with his half-brother Hawkfrost, which does not sit well with Squirrelflight. Brambleclaw has a dream in which he sees Tigerstar, his evil dead father, and Hawkfrost. Tigerstar praises Brambleclaw and Hawkfrost for their courage during the change in territory and tells them that he has great plans for them. There is also tension erupting in WindClan, which seems to be divided in two groups consisting of Mudclaw's supporters and Onewhisker's supporters.

One night, Spottedleaf, a former ThunderClan medicine cat, now deceased, goes to Leafpaw, a ThunderClan medicine cat apprentice, and tells her to follow her. Leafpaw's friend Sorreltail accompanies Leafpaw, and the two of them go far up on ThunderClan's territory near the border with WindClan. Spottedleaf takes Leafpaw to her destination: a pool of water which reflects the stars and moonlight. Leafpaw sees all of the cats of StarClan and realizes this could be the replacement for the Moonstone. Bluestar, former leader of ThunderClan tells her that this place, the Moonpool, is where medicine cats come to share tongues with StarClan. She goes back to tell Cinderpelt, ThunderClan's medicine cat, and the two of them tell all of the other medicine cats.

The next day, Mistyfoot rushes into ThunderClan camp and says that Mudclaw and Hawkfrost have been meeting at night. She then says that Hawkfrost and a patrol went out at dawn that day and had not returned, and she suspects that they have gone to attack Onewhisker's followers in WindClan. Firestar assembles a patrol to accompany him to fight, and sure enough, a battle starts on WindClan territory. Leafpool is left behind with a couple of other ThunderClan warriors in the camp. Two ShadowClan warriors invade and almost kill Leafpool when Crowfeather comes to her rescue. Crowfeather confesses he loves her, and she realizes she loves him too. During the battle, Brambleclaw fights Mudclaw. Although Mudclaw has the advantage over Brambleclaw, Hawkfrost saves Brambleclaw. Mudclaw claims that he and Hawkfrost had an agreement: Mudclaw would take over and make Hawkfrost the deputy, despite the fact that Hawkfrost is from RiverClan. Hawkfrost denies this when lightning suddenly strikes a tree, crushing Mudclaw and making a bridge to an island, making it the new Gathering place.

=== Twilight ===
ThunderClan continues to suffer from Mudclaw's attack on WindClan, as ThunderClan supports them in battle but they pay the price with wounds. Onewhisker travels to the Moonpool, earning his nine lives and leader name, becoming Onestar.

Leafpool deals with her forbidden love with Crowfeather, and struggles with her feelings; she must choose between her heart and her Clan. Throughout the book, Leafpool and Crowfeather secretly meet each other. Cinderpelt finally confronts Leafpool when she is seen with Crowfeather. The two medicine cats fight, and Leafpool decides to run away from the Clans with Crowfeather after Spottedleaf tells her to follow her heart. After a long night alone in the hills, Leafpool and Crowfeather return to the Clans after hearing of a badger attack on the Clans from Midnight.

During the fight, Sorreltail suddenly starts to have her kits and Cinderpelt stays to help Sorreltail. Although Sorreltail gives birth to four healthy kits, Cinderpelt is killed by a badger while protecting her. ThunderClan begins to lose the battle, but WindClan joins in to help, summoned by Midnight. Together, the two Clans manage to drive the badgers away.

=== Sunset ===
After a badger attack destroys much of ThunderClan's camp, Brook Where Small Fish Swim (Brook) and Stormfur, old friends of ThunderClan, help to rebuild the camp. The battle rekindles Squirrelflight's love for Brambleclaw (following a conflict between the two during the previous book), leading her to have an argument a few days after with Ashfur, whom she had moved to following her separation from Brambleclaw.

Leafpool finds herself struggling between grief and betrayal, for she has not seen Cinderpelt in the ranks of StarClan.

After months of waiting and with persuasion from Brambleclaw, Stormfur, the new medicine cat Leafpool, and his own mate Sandstorm, Firestar, leader of ThunderClan, finally declares that his friend and deputy Graystripe is not going to return after being abducted by humans in Dawn. When a dream from StarClan, the spirits of the cats' ancestors, tells Leafpool that Brambleclaw should be the new deputy, Firestar agrees and appoints Brambleclaw as the new deputy. The decision is met with objection, because Brambleclaw had never mentored an apprentice, a requirement for becoming deputy. The matter is cleared when Firestar declares that Brambleclaw will mentor Berrykit when the kit turns six months of age and mentions Leafpool's dream from StarClan to his warriors.

Tigerstar, an evil cat who is dead, continues to visit his sons (through different mothers) Hawkfrost and Brambleclaw in their dreams and when Brambleclaw becomes deputy, Tigerstar reveals his plan for Brambleclaw to take over ThunderClan and WindClan and for Hawkfrost to take over RiverClan and ShadowClan. Brambleclaw firmly rejects this idea, but agrees to make up a plan with Hawkfrost when they awake.

During the meeting, Brambleclaw hears a cat struggling in pain. He finds Firestar caught in a fox trap (wire snare) and Hawkfrost urges Brambleclaw to kill the ThunderClan leader so that Brambleclaw can become the new leader. After struggling with his desires, Brambleclaw refuses to kill Firestar and frees him from the trap. Since Brambleclaw betrays their father's plans, Hawkfrost attacks Brambleclaw, but Brambleclaw kills Hawkfrost with the trap's sharp stick by stabbing his neck. Before he dies, Hawkfrost claims to Brambleclaw that a ThunderClan warrior helped him with his plan and that their fight is not over.

== Themes ==
Themes in the series deal with religion, conflicting loyalty, and cooperation. A reviewer from Children's Literature wrote that it "shows how difficult it can be for four separate and sometimes hostile groups to work together for a common goal, but also shows the rewards of that cooperation". This refers to how all four Clans, who used to fight each other for food, must suddenly help each other for a common goal in Dawn. Religion and loyalty are explored when the Clans meet the Tribe of Rushing Water, and Stormfur is torn between the Clans and Brook Where Small Fish Swim, as well as when the Clans realize that Tribe cats believe in the Tribe of Endless Hunting and not StarClan. The religion issue causes the Clan and Tribe to be slightly distrustful of each other because they do not understand each other. Series editor Victoria Holmes, however, has stated in an author chat that both the Clans and the Tribe are "equally valid" when it comes to faith.
