= The New Prophecy =

The New Prophecy can refer to several things.

- Montanism, an early Christian movement
- Warriors: The New Prophecy, a juvenile fantasy novel series about feral cats by Erin Hunter
