= Warriors: Omen of the Stars =

Fourth arc in the Warriors series

- Boxed set of the six books in Omen of the Stars, with original cover art
- The Fourth Apprentice (2009); Fading Echoes (2010); Night Whispers (2010); Sign of the Moon (2011); The Forgotten Warrior (2011); The Last Hope (2012)
- Author: Erin Hunter
- Illustrator: Wayne McLoughlin
- Country: United States/Canada
- Language: English
- Genre: Children's literature Fantasy
- Publisher: HarperCollins
- Published: 24 November 2009 – 3 April 2012
- Preceded by: Warriors: Power of Three
- Followed by: Warriors: Dawn of the Clans

Warriors: Omen of the Stars is the fourth arc in the Warriors juvenile fantasy novel series about feral cats who live in Clans. It is made up of six novels published by HarperCollins from 2009 to 2012: The Fourth Apprentice, Fading Echoes, Night Whispers, Sign of the Moon, The Forgotten Warrior, and The Last Hope. The novels were written by Erin Hunter, a pseudonym that refers to authors Kate Cary, Cherith Baldry, and Tui Sutherland, as well as plot developer and editor Victoria Holmes. Omen of the Stars details the experiences of Jayfeather, Lionblaze, and Dovewing, who, as part of a prophecy, have special powers. The arc's themes deal with forbidden love and the effect that being different can have on relationships. Though the Warriors series has appeared on the New York Times Best Seller list, none of the novels in Warriors: Omen of the Stars have won a significant literary award.

== Publication history ==
In the United States, hardcover and e-book formats for The Fourth Apprentice were published on 24 November 2009, Fading Echoes on 6 April 2010, Night Whispers on 23 November 2010, Sign of the Moon on 5 April 2011, The Forgotten Warrior on 22 November 2011, and The Last Hope on 3 April 2012. The first four books were also released on their respective dates in an audiobook format, read by Kathleen McInerney. Paperback editions of each were released on 21 December 2010, 5 April 2011, 27 December 2011, 3 April 2012, 26 December 2012, and 2 April 2013, respectively.

Release in Canada generally preceded release in the United States by a few days. The Fourth Apprentice was released in hardcover on 24 November 2009 (same as the United States) and paperback on 13 December 2010. Fading Echoes was released in hardcover on 15 May 2010 and paperback on 5 April 2011. Night Whispers was released in hardcover on 19 November 2010 and paperback on 19 December 2011. Sign of the Moon was released in hardcover on 5 April 2011 (same as the United States) and paperback on 26 March 2012. The Forgotten Warrior was released in hardcover on 22 November 2011 (same as the United States) and 13 December 2012. The Last Hope was released in hardcover on 26 March 2012 and in paperback on 25 March 2013.

== Synopsis ==
=== The Fourth Apprentice ===
The Fourth Apprentice
- Publication date: 24 November 2009
- Media type: Print (hardback and paperback), audiobook, e-book
- Pages: 352
- ISBN: 978-0-06-155509-1
- OCLC: 310399272
- Preceded by: Sunrise
- Followed by: Fading Echoes

The Fourth Apprentice takes place approximately six months after the end of Sunrise, during the summer, when the four Clans are suffering from a drought. In ThunderClan, sisters Dovekit and Ivykit become apprentices, being assigned Lionblaze and Cinderheart as mentors. While out in the forest, Dovepaw notices several things that are too far away for other cats to notice. Nearly a month later, Dovepaw speaks of hearing and seeing beavers up the river building a dam, blocking the river's water and causing the drought, but no other cat believes her. Lionblaze realizes that Dovepaw is one of the Three foretold in the prophecy "There will be three, kin of your kin, who hold the power of the stars in their paws", of which he and his brother Jayfeather are also a part of. They each have a special power, and he realizes that Dovepaw's is the ability to see, hear and smell things very far away (clairvoyance).

Lionblaze plans to travel up the stream and find a way to unblock it and bring the water back, a journey that would include a cat from each Clan. ThunderClan leader Firestar agrees, sending Lionblaze and Dovepaw to represent ThunderClan. After an initial failed attack on the beaver dam, in which RiverClan warrior Rippletail is killed, the patrol succeeds in destroying the dam with the help of a few housecats encountered during their journey.

Meanwhile, back in ThunderClan, when the warrior Poppyfrost secretly leaves camp to visit the Moonpool, a sacred location for the Clans' medicine cats, ThunderClan medicine cat Jayfeather follows her there. Upon arriving at the Moonpool, Jayfeather is attacked by his half-brother, WindClan warrior Breezepelt, who had also followed Poppyfrost to the Moonpool. The spirit of another cat whom Jayfeather does not know (Brokenstar), aids Breezepelt in the attack, but the spirit of Poppyfrost's sister, Honeyfern, comes to Jayfeather's aid and chases them away.

Jayfeather tells Lionblaze about the tom that aided Breezepelt, and Lionblaze confesses to meeting Tigerstar, the antagonist from the original Warriors series, in his dreams in the past. They realize that Breezepelt must have been recruited by Tigerstar to help fight in a war between StarClan and the Dark Forest.

=== Fading Echoes ===
Fading Echoes
- Publication date: 6 April 2010
- Media type: Print (hardback and paperback), audiobook, e-book
- Pages: 296
- ISBN: 978-0-06-155514-5
- Preceded by: The Fourth Apprentice
- Followed by: Night Whispers

The spirit of Hawkfrost, Tigerstar's son, begins to visit Ivypaw in her dreams and teaches her battle moves, pretending he is from StarClan. Ivypaw, still jealous that Dovepaw is keeping secrets from her and is praised by their clanmates, decides not to tell anyone about Hawkfrost's training.

The spirit of Tigerstar tells Ivypaw that giving a strip of territory to ShadowClan to avoid future conflicts has endangered ThunderClan. Ivypaw believes Tigerstar and tells Firestar that she had a dream from StarClan of ShadowClan invading because they believe that Firestar is too weak to keep his own territory. Firestar and the senior warriors decide to attack ShadowClan preemptively. During the battle, Lionblaze accidentally kills ShadowClan deputy Russetfur after she takes Firestar's eighth life. ThunderClan wins the territory back.

=== Night Whispers ===
Night Whispers
- Publication date: 23 November 2010
- Media type: Print (hardback and paperback), audiobook, e-book
- Pages: 295
- Preceded by: Fading Echoes
- Followed by: Sign of the Moon

Jayfeather unintentionally enters Ivypaw's dream, and discovers that Ivypaw and Tigerheart are receiving training from the cats in the Dark Forest.

Lionblaze and Cinderheart decide to do an early border patrol and run into ShadowClan medicine cat apprentice Flametail, who is angry with Lionblaze for killing Russetfur in Fading Echoes.

Dovepaw later uses her power to listen in on Lionblaze and Jayfeather, who are discussing Ivypaw's training in the Dark Forest, then confronts Ivypaw about it. Ivypaw denies that it is wrong. Dovepaw wants to try to stop her from going, but Jayfeather tells her to leave Ivypaw alone for the time being.

Blackstar, leader of ShadowClan, asks Flametail and his mentor Littlecloud, whether StarClan sent them a sign regarding the battle or not. When they reveal that there was no sign, Blackstar asks Littlecloud to go to the Moonpool to speak with StarClan. When Flametail arrives at the Moonpool, the spirit of Raggedstar, a former ShadowClan leader, tells him that ShadowClan must stand alone and not trust any allies.

In the Dark Forest, Ivypaw overhears Tigerstar telling Tigerheart during a training session that if Tigerheart cannot beat those "ThunderClan weaklings", he is nothing. Ivypaw, realizing that Tigerstar lied to her, flees. She then agrees to act as a spy on the Dark Forest for Jayfeather, Lionblaze, and Dovepaw.

Flametail falls through the ice on the frozen lake while playing a game with other apprentices and begins to drown. Jayfeather attempts to save Flametail until the spirit of Rock, an ancient cat from before the time of the Clans, appears and tells Jayfeather that it is Flametail's destiny to die, but not his. Jayfeather lets go of Flametail, who sinks to the bottom of the lake and drowns.

=== Sign of the Moon ===
Sign of the Moon
- Publication date: 5 April 2011
- Media type: Print (hardback and paperback), audiobook, e-book
- Pages: 352
- ISBN: 978-0-06-155518-3
- OCLC: 641531926
- Preceded by: Night Whispers
- Followed by: The Forgotten Warrior

Jayfeather, Dovewing, and Squirrelflight visit the Tribe of Rushing Water, where Jayfeather receives a dream from the ancient cat Rock, who insists he go to the mountains, but he won't tell him why. While there, Jayfeather is sent back in time in dreams as his previous incarnation, Jay's Wing, to convince the Tribe's ancestors to stay in the mountains after journeying from the lake at Jayfeather/Jay's Wing's urging in Long Shadows. Realizing that the ancient Tribe has not yet gained a connection with their ancestors' spirits, he appoints the Tribe's first Teller of the Pointed Stones (also called Stoneteller, a role similar to Clan leader and medicine cat combined). He appoints Half Moon, a she-cat he had fallen for during his dream, then returns to the present day, where he appoints Crag Where Eagles Nest as the Stoneteller of the modern Tribe, because the old Stoneteller died of old age without appointing a successor.

=== The Forgotten Warrior ===
The Forgotten Warrior
- Publication date: 22 November 2011
- Media type: Print (hardback and paperback), audiobook, e-book
- Pages: 384
- ISBN: 978-0-06-238262-7
- Preceded by: Sign of the Moon
- Followed by: The Last Hope

New ThunderClan apprentices Cherrypaw and Molepaw have a run-in with a fox, but an unknown cat saves them. Lionblaze investigates, finding Sol, a loner first introduced in Eclipse who previously predicted an eclipse that briefly convinced ShadowClan to lose faith in StarClan. Sol says that he saved the apprentices and is welcomed by some, but not trusted by others. When Sol disappears, Dovewing and Ivypool follow him into the tunnels and discover that he is trying to cause a battle between ThunderClan and WindClan. While Dovewing and Ivypool are spying on Sol and WindClan in the tunnels, WindClan warrior Owlwhisker almost discovers them, but Hollyleaf, who was previously thought to be killed in a tunnel collapse in Sunrise, leads them to safety. Before she can re-enter the tunnels, Lionblaze arrives and convinces her to return to ThunderClan. Dovewing and Ivypool reveal that Sol is planning an attack on ThunderClan and that Hollyleaf was the one who saved the apprentices from the fox, not him. In preparation for the battle, Hollyleaf teaches ThunderClan battle skills useful in the tunnels. When WindClan attacks through the tunnels, ThunderClan repels the attack and ultimately wins, being more experienced in underground combat due to Hollyleaf's training. Sol runs off, never to be seen again.

=== The Last Hope ===
The Last Hope
- Publication date: 21 March 2012 (Canada); 3 April 2012 (United States)
- Media type: Print (hardback and paperback), e-book
- Pages: 384
- ISBN: 978-0-06-155527-5
- Preceded by: The Forgotten Warrior

Jayfeather receives a prophecy informing him that there is actually a fourth cat in the prophecy regarding him, Lionblaze, and Dovewing. Jayfeather initially believes it may be Mothwing, medicine cat of RiverClan. However, divisions between the medicine cats due to the accusation that Jayfeather murdered Flametail in Night Whispers makes it difficult for him to speak to Mothwing. Jayfeather is granted safe passage into RiverClan territory, however, and Mothwing shows him a reed that has been smoldering for days, even after a heavy rainfall. Jayfeather takes this as an omen to find the spirit of Flametail in StarClan, although the divisions in StarClan make it difficult. When he finds Flametail, he convinces him to reveal the truth: that he had drowned and was not killed by Jayfeather. This revelation resolves the divisions among the medicine cats, who then unite StarClan in preparation for the final battle with the Dark Forest. Former ThunderClan leader Bluestar tells Jayfeather that the fourth cat in the prophecy is Firestar. The final battle between the Clans and the Dark Forest then begins, with both StarClan and Dark Forest cats taking on corporeal forms. It's not long before the battle begins spin out of control. The battle ends when Firestar kills Tigerstar's spirit, and then perishes himself, making Brambleclaw the new leader of ThunderClan.

== Reception ==
Reviews for the series were generally positive. A reviewer for Booklist suggested that fans of the series would enjoy The Fourth Apprentice and called Dovepaw a "reluctant heroine". A reviewer for Horn Book Guide praised the dramatic adventures and fight scenes. It was also noted that Fading Echoes explores how having special abilities can affect relationships. A reviewer for Booklist called Sign of the Moon a "bridge book", but praised Hunter for the quality of the novel and allowing readers to "get to know a few of the multitudinous cast" better.

One criticism of the series came from both Beth L. Meister and Kitty Flynn writing for Horn Book Guide, who noted in multiple reviews for books in the series that new readers would have difficulty getting into the story due to the amount of required background information and numerous characters. However, they rated all six books four out of a six-point scale. Meister also commented that themes often revolve around forbidden romances.
