= List of Warriors characters =

List of characters in the novel series Warriors

Warriors is a novel series written by Erin Hunter, a pseudonym used by multiple authors. Due to the large number of characters, this list is divided by group.

Characters listed under a specific arc may still play a significant role in other arcs, as they are listed under only the first arc in which they were significant.

== Overview ==
=== Naming conventions ===
In the Warriors universe, the characters in the five Clans (ThunderClan, RiverClan, WindClan, ShadowClan, and SkyClan) have names composed of two parts. Each cat's name has a prefix (Blue-, Bramble-, Tall-, etc.) which generally stays constant throughout their life. The name's suffix varies through the character's lifespan and position within the Clan, with the bestowing of the new name being a component of ceremonies marking these role changes. As a kitten, the character's name ends with "-kit" (Bluekit, Bramblekit, Tallkit, etc.). Upon becoming an apprentice (a warrior or medicine cat in training), "-paw" replaces "-kit" (Bluepaw, Bramblepaw, Tallpaw). When the character completes their apprenticeship and is promoted to a warrior or medicine cat, the suffix to their name is then changed to one chosen by the Clan leader or medicine cat (Bluefur, Brambleclaw, Talltail, etc.). If a cat becomes a Clan leader, they are granted the suffix "-star" at the end of their name (Bluestar, Bramblestar, Tallstar). If a leader commits a crime, they may be deemed unworthy of their name, stripped of the "-star" suffix, and return to using their warrior name. This can also happen if a leader retires. A cat may also have their name changed in a special ceremony.

This naming convention does not hold for non-Clan characters. For example, in the Tribe of Rushing Water, a cat's name is said to be the first memorable thing their mother sees after giving birth (such as "Brook Where Small Fish Swim" or "Night of No Stars"). They are often referred to by only the first word of their name (such as "Brook" or "Night"). These names remain unchanged throughout a Tribe cat's life, with one exception: if a Tribe cat becomes Teller of the Pointed Stones (a position akin to a Clan leader and medicine cat combined), their name becomes Teller of the Pointed Stones, or Stoneteller.

The ancient ancestors of the Clan and the Tribe followed a simple naming convention that consisted of two words (Moth Flight, Half Moon, etc.).

Cats who do not identify under any group may have entirely different names.

=== Spiritual beliefs ===
When Clan cats die, their spirits go to a place called StarClan, a Heaven-like afterlife, if they were good cats in life. If the cats were not good in their life, their spirits are sent to the Dark Forest (also known as The Place of No Stars), a hellish type of purgatory. Cats may try to communicate with StarClan through a chunk of quartz deep in a mountain off the Clans' forest territory called the Moonstone, a secluded pool of water called the Moonpool in their lake territories, or a cave in a gorge known as the Whispering Cave. They can also be contacted through the Cave of Pointed Stones in the Tribe's territory.

== ThunderClan ==
ThunderClan is one of the five warrior Clans. ThunderClan was the home of the original protagonist of the Warriors series and has remained a pivotal group to date.

=== Crookedstar's Promise ===
==== Mapleshade ====
Ancient spirit she-cat who haunts the dreams of other cats, particularly Crookedstar and the first Tigerstar. She resides in the Dark Forest.

=== The Prophecies Begin ===
The Prophecies Begin covers events from Into the Wild to The Darkest Hour. It details house cat Rusty's journey from apprentice to leader of ThunderClan.

==== Bluestar ====
Leader of ThunderClan before Firestar. She was responsible for allowing Firestar to join ThunderClan.

==== Cinderpelt ====
ThunderClan's medicine cat after Yellowfang. She originally trained as a warrior under Firestar, but an accident left her back leg permanently broken, forcing her to become a medicine cat instead. She is killed during a badger attack on the ThunderClan camp in Twilight, then is reincarnated as Cinderheart. Cinderpelt's spirit ultimately leaves Cinderheart to join StarClan in The Last Hope, allowing Cinderheart to live her own life.

==== Firestar ====
Firestar is the main protagonist of The Prophecies Begin. Born a house cat named Rusty, he is invited to join ThunderClan after venturing into their forest territory. He trains under the mentorship of Bluestar and rises in rank in the Clan to eventually become the leader. While a warrior, he exposes former ThunderClan warrior Tigerstar's treachery. He later mates with Sandstorm and has two kits, Leafpool and Squirrelstar. He dies defeating Tigerstar's spirit in The Last Hope.

==== Graystripe ====
Firestar's best friend. He was in love with Silverstream of RiverClan, with whom he had two kits, Feathertail and Stormfur. He was the deputy of ThunderClan for a time, but after he was captured by humans, his position was revoked. He eventually found his way back to the Clans with his new mate, Millie. He died in A Light in the Mist while fighting against cats of the Dark Forest.

==== Sandstorm ====
Warrior of ThunderClan and Firestar's mate, with whom she had two kits, Leafpool and Squirrelstar.

==== Spottedleaf ====
Medicine cat of ThunderClan when Firestar first joins ThunderClan. She is murdered in the first book of the series, but continues to guide Firestar from StarClan. During the Great Battle in The Last Hope, her spirit is killed.

==== Tigerstar ====
Main antagonist of The Prophecies Begin. Deputy of ThunderClan under Bluestar's rule. Former ThunderClan warrior, though after being exiled for attempting to murder Bluestar and usurp power, he becomes leader of ShadowClan. He is responsible for bringing BloodClan to the forest, as well as for training cats in the Dark Forest. He had several kits, including Brambleclaw, Tawnypelt, Hawkfrost, and Mothwing.

==== Yellowfang ====
ThunderClan medicine cat after Spottedleaf. Former ShadowClan medicine cat, and mother of Brokenstar. Prior to serving as a medicine cat she was a warrior, and she was forced to resign due to her ability to feel the pain of other cats.

=== The New Prophecy ===
The New Prophecy covers events from Midnight to Sunset. It details the Clans' attempt to relocate to a new home around a lake after their old home in a forest was destroyed by humans.

==== Ashfur ====
Former warrior of ThunderClan. Ashfur fell in love with Squirrelstar. He was heartbroken when Squirrelstar chose Brambleclaw over him in Sunset. He began plotting destruction against Squirrelstar, and tried to kill her father and her kits. After he died, he used his time in StarClan to plan his takeover of the living Clans. His spirit is the main antagonist of The Broken Code, wherein he possesses Brambleclaw's body. His spirit is ultimately defeated again in A Light in the Mist.

==== Brambleclaw ====
Leader of ThunderClan after Firestar. Son of the first Tigerstar. He journeys with a group of cats from each Clan to the ocean, where they learn of their forest home's imminent destruction. With this group, he then leads the Clans to their new territory. He mated with Squirrelflight, with whom he had two kits, Sparkpelt and Alderheart. In The Broken Code, his body was possessed by Ashfur, and for a time his spirit was cast out from his body, trapped in the Dark Forest. He took his body back after Ashfur was defeated. In A Starless Clan, he steps down as leader and becomes an elder, and later dies.

==== Leafpool ====
Medicine cat of ThunderClan after Cinderpelt and mother to Hollyleaf, Jayfeather, and Lionblaze. Daughter of Firestar.

==== Squirrelstar ====
Brambleclaw's mate and leader of ThunderClan. She served as his deputy before he stepped down. She is the mother of Alderheart and Sparkpelt, and the daughter of Firestar. Leafpool is her sister.

=== Power of Three ===
Power of Three covers events from The Sight to Sunrise. It details the coming-of-age of three ThunderClan warriors, two of whom were born with special powers.

==== Hollyleaf ====
Warrior of ThunderClan. Sister of Jayfeather and Lionblaze. She runs away from the Clans for a time upon the realization that she has no powers, and after she murders Ashfur. She eventually returns to ThunderClan.

==== Jayfeather ====
ThunderClan's medicine cat after Leafpool. He is blind, and can enter the dreams of other cats. He also has the ability to sense others' feelings and thoughts.

==== Lionblaze ====
Warrior of ThunderClan. He was granted the ability to never be wounded in battle.

=== Omen of the Stars ===
Omen of the Stars covers events from The Fourth Apprentice to The Last Hope. It details the Clans fighting against the spirits of vengeful Dark Forest cats in a battle called the Great Battle.

==== Dovewing ====
Warrior of ThunderClan who was given the ability to hear far beyond what a normal cat could. She later left ThunderClan to live in ShadowClan with her mate, the second Tigerstar. Mother of Shadowsight and Lightleap.

==== Ivypool ====
Deputy of ThunderClan who served as a spy in the Dark Forest. Sister to Dovewing. Mother of Bristlefrost.

=== A Vision of Shadows ===
A Vision of Shadows covers events from The Apprentice's Quest to The Raging Storm. It details the Clans trying to settle the previously lost Clan, SkyClan, around the lake, while also dealing with a group of dangerous stray cats.

==== Alderheart ====
Medicine cat of ThunderClan after Jayfeather.

==== Twigbranch ====
Warrior of ThunderClan, former warrior of SkyClan. Sister of Violetshine.

=== The Broken Code ===
The Broken Code covers events from Lost Stars to A Light in the Mist. It details the Clans trying to defeat Ashfur and his group of zombified spirit cats.

==== Bristlefrost ====
Warrior of ThunderClan. Played a major role in defeating Ashfur. Ultimately gave her life to defeat Ashfur, in such a way that her spirit was also killed.

=== A Starless Clan ===
A Starless Clan covers events from River to Star. It details the struggles that come with the Clans trying to rewrite the warrior code.

==== Nightheart ====
Warrior of ThunderClan. He is restless and uncomfortable with being related to Firestar, feeling unfairly pressured to live up to the great leader. Mate to Sunbeam.

=== Changing Skies ===
Changing Skies covers events from The Elders' Quest to an unpublished book. It details the Clans' struggles with humans encroaching on their territory and a mysterious foreboding prophecy.

==== Moonglow ====
Former ThunderClan cat and protagonist of the ninth arc. She is haunted by the spirit of her dead sister, Brightmorning.

==== Brightmorning ====
Sister of Moonglow. She died shortly after her birth, and haunts Moonglow, refusing to move on to StarClan. She is immature and spiteful.

== RiverClan ==
RiverClan is one of the five warrior Clans, and the home of one of the eighth arc's protagonists.

=== The Prophecies Begin ===
==== Crookedstar ====
Leader of RiverClan before Leopardstar. Haunted by Mapleshade in his youth. Father of Silverstream.

==== Leopardstar ====
Leader of RiverClan after Crookedstar.

==== Mistystar ====
Daughter of Bluestar, and leader of RiverClan after Leopardstar.

==== Silverstream ====
RiverClan warrior. Daughter of Crookedstar and mate of Graystripe. She died while giving birth to her kits, Feathertail and Stormfur.

=== The New Prophecy ===
==== Feathertail ====
Former RiverClan warrior. Chosen RiverClan cat for the journey to find the lake territories. She saved the Tribe of Rushing Water from a mountain lion called Sharptooth in Moonrise. However, she died in the process, and chose to stay in the Tribe's version of StarClan, The Tribe of Endless Hunting. Had a brief romance with Crowfeather.

==== Hawkfrost ====
Former warrior of RiverClan and half-brother of Brambleclaw through the first Tigerstar. He tried to kill Firestar so that Brambleclaw could become leader, but Brambleclaw killed Hawkfrost to save Firestar before Hawkfrost could enact his plan. In the Dark Forest, he trained Ivypool, and his spirit was eventually killed by Brambleclaw once more.

==== Mothwing ====
Medicine cat of RiverClan. She didn't believe in StarClan for a very long time. Later, she admits that StarClan exists, but she still questions the idea of being guided by spirits.

=== A Starless Clan ===
==== Frostdawn ====
Medicine cat of RiverClan. Previously trained as a warrior.

==== Splashtail ====
Became the false leader of RiverClan for a time via manipulative plots and schemes. Went to the Dark Forest.

==== Icestar ====
Current leader of RiverClan. Trained in the Dark Forest as a young cat.

== WindClan ==
WindClan is one of the five warrior Clans.

=== The Prophecies Begin ===
==== Tallstar ====
Leader of WindClan when Firestar first joins ThunderClan. He died of old age in Starlight, which triggered a leadership struggle between his former deputy, Mudclaw, and Onewhisker, whom he named as his new deputy immediately prior to his death.

==== Onestar ====
Leader of WindClan after Tallstar. He had an illegitimate son named Darktail, and he rejected him when he was young. He ultimately died fighting him.

=== The New Prophecy ===
==== Crowfeather ====
Deputy of WindClan under Harestar. He was the chosen WindClan cat for the journey to find the lake territories. He mated with Leafpool, with whom he had Hollyleaf, Lionblaze, and Jayfeather. He also mated with Nightcloud, with whom he had Breezepelt.

==== Mudclaw ====
Warrior and former deputy of WindClan. Led a rebellion against Onewhisker in an attempt to regain the right to leadership, but was killed in the process.

=== Power of Three ===
==== Breezepelt ====
Breezepelt is the son of Crowfeather and Nightcloud. It is revealed in Long Shadows that he is also half-brother to Hollyleaf, Jayfeather, and Lionblaze, whose parents are Crowfeather and ThunderClan medicine cat Leafpool. He trained in the Dark Forest for a while, angry about his father's rejection of him, before eventually reconciling with him in Crowfeather's Trial.

==== Nightcloud ====
Nightcloud is the mother of Breezepelt and former mate of Crowfeather. She and Crowfeather separate following the revelation in Sunrise that Crowfeather also fathered Hollyleaf, Jayfeather, and Lionblaze with ThunderClan medicine cat Leafpool. They argue with each other for a while, before eventually reconciling in Crowfeather's Trial.

== ShadowClan ==
ShadowClan is one of the five warrior Clans. It was originally the home of most of the series' antagonists, but starting in Omen of the Stars, ShadowClan protagonists were introduced as well.

=== The Prophecies Begin ===
==== Blackstar ====
Deputy of ShadowClan under Brokenstar and the first Tigerstar, and later leader. He served as a bruiser for both aforementioned leaders, before eventually being redeemed in a StarClan-held trial.

==== Brokenstar ====
Leader of ShadowClan when Firestar comes to the forest in The Prophecies Begin. He killed kits by sending them into battle before they were strong enough to defend themselves. His soul was sent to the Dark Forest when he died, and it was eventually killed by Yellowfang, his mother.

==== Nightstar ====
Leader of ShadowClan after Brokenstar. He was an elder, but stepped up to lead the Clan when Brokenstar was banished. However, he did not receive nine lives because Brokenstar was still alive and had not surrendered his own lives. He had a permanent respiratory disease. He led the Clan through a sickness induced by rats. He eventually died and was succeeded by the first Tigerstar.

=== The New Prophecy ===
==== Tawnypelt ====
Former apprentice of ThunderClan. Joined ShadowClan when her father, Tigerstar, became their leader. She mated with Rowanclaw and had several kits, including the second Tigerstar and Flametail.

=== Power of Three ===
==== Flametail ====
Former medicine cat of ShadowClan, who drowned after falling through ice on a frozen lake.

==== Rowanclaw ====
Leader of ShadowClan after Blackstar. He stepped down in cowardice after he failed to respond to Darktail's group of strays appropriately.

==== Tigerstar ====
Leader of ShadowClan after Rowanclaw. He was named after former ShadowClan leader Tigerstar, his grandfather. His mate is Dovewing, and his son is Shadowsight.

=== A Vision of Shadows ===
==== Needletail ====
Former apprentice of ShadowClan. She joined Darktail's group of strays for a time before she eventually gave her life to save Violetshine.

=== The Broken Code ===
==== Shadowsight ====
Medicine cat of ShadowClan. Played a major role in defeating Ashfur after being manipulated by him. Has no connection to StarClan.

=== A Starless Clan ===
==== Sunbeam ====
Warrior of ShadowClan. She later moved to ThunderClan to be mates with Nightheart.

==== Berryheart ====
Former warrior of ShadowClan, and later a false RiverClan deputy. Splashtail's accomplice and Sunbeam's mother. She went to the Dark Forest after she died.

== SkyClan ==
SkyClan is one of the five warrior Clans. After losing its territory to human deforestation, it was chased from the original forest by the other Clans, who were not willing to share their own territory with them. They tried to make a new home in a gorge far away, but were constantly attacked by rats, and eventually the Clan disbanded. In Firestar's Quest, Firestar was sent to the gorge by StarClan to start the Clan anew. In A Vision of Shadows, SkyClan returns to the lake to take a place among the other four Clans once more.

=== Modern SkyClan ===
==== Firestar's Quest ====
Firestar's Quest details Firestar's journey to rebuild SkyClan.

===== Leafstar =====
First leader of modern SkyClan.

==== A Vision of Shadows ====
===== Tree =====
SkyClan mediator. Formerly of the Sisters. Mates with Violetshine, with whom he has Rootspring. He can see and talk to spirits.

===== Violetshine =====
SkyClan warrior who lived in ShadowClan and in Darktail's group of strays for a time.

==== The Broken Code ====
===== Rootspring =====
SkyClan warrior who played a major part in defeating Ashfur. Like his father, Tree, he can see and talk to spirits. He fell in love with Bristlefrost.

==== Changing Skies ====
===== Starlingflight =====
SkyClan warrior. He worries about an ominous prophecy which he overhears on a journey with several other cats to the Tribe. Later, he begins to tell lies to advance himself within the Clan. His constant outbursts against authority figures foster division in his Clan.

=== Ancient SkyClan ===
Members of SkyClan while or after it was driven from the old forest.

==== Cloudstar ====
Leader of SkyClan when it was driven from the forest.

== BloodClan ==
BloodClan is a group of dangerous cats who live in a human town.

=== The Rise of Scourge ===
The Rise of Scourge details the coming-of-age of BloodClan leader Scourge.

==== Scourge ====
Formerly named Tiny. After being attacked by the first Tigerstar as a kit, Scourge grew to resent the Clans, and came to lead the cats of a human town as a dictator. He eventually kills Tigerstar. He was killed by Firestar.

==== Bone ====
Scourge's bruiser and second-in-command.

== The Tribe of Rushing Water ==
The Tribe of Rushing Water, oftened shortened to just the Tribe, is a group of cats who live in a mountain range. They are split into two groups: prey-hunters, who hunt prey, and cave-guards, who protect the prey-hunters and the cave the Tribe lives in. They are led by a cat who takes on the name Stoneteller.

=== The New Prophecy ===
==== Brook Where Small Fish Swim ====
Also known as Brook. Prey-hunter of the Tribe and Stormfur's mate.

==== Crag Where Eagles Nest ====
Also known as Crag, Stoneteller, and Teller of the Pointed Stones. Former cave-guard of the Tribe. Became the Stoneteller in Sign of the Moon.

==== Stormfur ====
Son of Graystripe and Silverstream. Brother of Feathertail and former RiverClan warrior. Mate to Brook Where Small Fish Swim. Cave-guard of the Tribe.

==== Teller of the Pointed Stones ====
Also known as Stoneteller. Leader of the Tribe until Sign of the Moon, when he dies.

== Ancient cats ==
The Ancient cats lived around the lake long before the Clans or the Tribe were formed.

=== Dawn of the Clans ===
Dawn of the Clans covers events from The Sun Trail to Path of Stars. It details how the Clans came to be.

==== Clear Sky ====
First leader of SkyClan, later Skystar. Father to Thunder.

==== Gray Wing ====
Majorly influenced the creation of the modern Clans. Known as "Graywing the Wise" to modern Clan cats.

==== Half Moon ====
Also known as Stoneteller and Teller of the Pointed Stones. First leader of what would become the Tribe of Rushing Water. Was in love with Jay's Wing.

==== Jay's Wing ====
Ancient cat who was later reincarnated into Jayfeather. Was in love with Half Moon.

==== Moth Flight ====
First medicine cat and member of WindClan. Daughter of Wind Runner.

==== One Eye ====
Stray who caused trouble for the Clans during their inception. Founder of the Dark Forest.

==== Tall Shadow ====
First leader of ShadowClan, later Shadowstar.

==== Thunder ====
First leader of ThunderClan, later Thunderstar. Son of Clear Sky.

==== River Ripple ====
First leader of RiverClan, later Riverstar. Previously a stray cat who lived in a park far away.

==== Wind Runner ====
First leader of WindClan, later Windstar. Mother of Moth Flight.

== The Sisters ==
The Sisters are a group of nomadic she-cats who roam from place to place. They have strong connections to the Earth and the spirit world. They do not allow toms to stay in their group beyond kithood.

=== Squirrelflight's Hope ===
Squirrelflight's Hope details the story of ThunderClan deputy Squirrelflight struggling with her lack of a legacy.

==== Moonlight ====
Leader of the Sisters before Snow. She died protecting her kits.

=== The Broken Code ===
==== Snow ====
Leader of the Sisters.

== Characters not in other groups ==
=== Tallstar's Revenge ===
==== Jake ====
Friend of Tallstar. Father of Firestar and Scourge.

=== The Prophecies Begin ===
==== Barley ====
Lived on a farm with Ravenpaw. Former member of BloodClan.

==== Ravenpaw ====
Former ThunderClan apprentice who came to live on a farm with Barley after fleeing ThunderClan in fear of being killed by the first Tigerstar after witnessing the latter's crimes. He was the protagonist of the manga trilogy Ravenpaw's Path, which consists of Shattered Peace, A Clan in Need, and The Heart of a Warrior.

=== The New Prophecy ===
==== Midnight ====
Badger who has existed since the dawn of time. She informs the journeying protagonists of The New Prophecy of their forest home's imminent destruction and instructs them on how to find a new home. Unlike other badgers, who cannot communicate with cats, Midnight can speak to cats, as well as rabbits, foxes, and other badgers.

==== Sharptooth ====
Mountain lion who lived in the mountains and terrorized the Tribe of Rushing Water. He was killed by Feathertail.

=== Power of Three ===
==== Rock ====
Hairless and blind cat who has existed since the dawn of time. Guides the Clans' destinies.

==== Sol ====
Formerly a house cat named Harry. After a bad experience with SkyClan at their gorge camp, Sol decided to find the lake Clans and try to disband them.

=== A Vision of Shadows ===
==== Darktail ====
Onestar's illegitimate and bitter son. Leader of a group of cats who attacked the Clans and tried to disband them.
