= Sunset (novel) =

2006 novel by Erin Hunter

- First edition cover, featuring Hawkfrost in the center image
- Author: Erin Hunter
- Cover artist: Wayne McLoughlin
- Language: English
- Series: Warriors: The New Prophecy
- Genre: Children's literature Fantasy novel
- Publisher: HarperCollins
- Publication date: 26 December 2006
- Publication place: United Kingdom
- Media type: Print (hardback & paperback)
- Pages: 320
- ISBN: 978-0-06-082769-4
- OCLC: 70673118
- LC Class: PZ7.H916625 Sun 2007
- Preceded by: Twilight
- Followed by: The Sight

Sunset is a fantasy novel, the sixth and final book in Erin Hunter's Warriors: The New Prophecy series. The book begins with the group of cats known as ThunderClan rebuilding its camp with the help of its old friends Stormfur and Brook following a badger attack in Twilight. As the book progresses, Brambleclaw and Squirrelflight overcome a previous conflict and fall in love again, but Brambleclaw continues to visit the spirit of his evil father Tigerstar in his dreams. Brambleclaw manages to convince ThunderClan leader Firestar to choose a new deputy to replace the long missing Graystripe and is surprised when he is chosen. Brambleclaw's half-brother Hawkfrost attempts to kill Firestar in order that Brambleclaw might become leader of ThunderClan, but Brambleclaw saves Firestar and kills Hawkfrost, fulfilling the prophecy "Before there is peace, blood will spill blood and the lake will run red".

The book was first released on 26 December 2006, in the US as a hardcover. It then was released as a paperback, e-book, and audiobook. The book was the third in the series to be released in audiobook format. The audiobook was read by Nanette Savard, whose performance was praised by AudioFile. Sunset received mixed to positive reviews from reviewers.

== Plot summary ==
After the badgers' fierce attack destroys much of ThunderClan's camp, Brook Where Small Fish Swim (Brook) and Stormfur, old friends of ThunderClan, help to rebuild the camp. The battle is not without its consequences, as both the medicine cat Cinderpelt and the warrior Sootfur die. The battle rekindles Squirrelflight's love for Brambleclaw (following a conflict between the two during the previous book), leading her to have an argument a few days after with Ashfur, whom she had moved to following her separation from Brambleclaw.

All of the Clans are grieving for the death of Cinderpelt. Leafpool finds herself struggling between grief and betrayal, for she has not seen Cinderpelt in the ranks of StarClan. During a visit to the Moonpool, where medicine cats share dreams with StarClan each month, former medicine cat Spottedleaf goes to Leafpool in a dream and shows her that Cinderpelt is reborn in the form of Cinderkit, one of Sorreltail's four kits whom Cinderpelt died protecting.

After months of waiting and with persuasion from multiple characters, Firestar, leader of ThunderClan, finally declares that his friend and deputy Graystripe is not going to return after being abducted by humans in Dawn. When a dream from StarClan, the spirits of the cats' ancestors, tells Leafpool that Brambleclaw should be the new deputy, Firestar agrees and appoints Brambleclaw as the new deputy. The decision is met with objection because Brambleclaw had never mentored an apprentice, a requirement for becoming deputy. The matter is cleared when Firestar declares that Brambleclaw will mentor Berrykit when the kit turns six months of age and mentions Leafpool's dream from StarClan to his warriors.

Tigerstar, an evil cat who is dead, continues to visit his sons (through different mothers) Hawkfrost and Brambleclaw in their dreams and when Brambleclaw becomes deputy, Tigerstar reveals his plan for Brambleclaw to take over ThunderClan and WindClan and for Hawkfrost to take over RiverClan and ShadowClan. Brambleclaw firmly rejects this idea but agrees to make up a plan with Hawkfrost when they are awake.

During the meeting, Brambleclaw hears a cat struggling in pain. He finds Firestar caught in a fox trap (wire snare) and Hawkfrost urges Brambleclaw to kill the ThunderClan leader so that Brambleclaw can become the new leader. After struggling with his desires, Brambleclaw refuses to kill Firestar and frees him from the trap. Hawkfrost attacks Brambleclaw, but Brambleclaw kills Hawkfrost with the trap's sharp stick by stabbing his neck. Before he dies, Hawkfrost claims to Brambleclaw that a ThunderClan warrior helped him with his plan and that their fight is not over.

The prophecy "Before there is peace, blood will spill blood, and the lake will run red", given to Leafpool in an earlier book, is fulfilled; since Brambleclaw and Hawkfrost are half-brothers, they share the same blood and are kin, and as he stumbles down to the lake, blood pours from Hawkfrost's neck, making the lake run red.

== Publication history ==
Sunset was released as a hardcover in the US and UK on 12 December 2006. The paperback version was released about a year later on 25 September 2007. Sunset has also been released in CD audiobook and e-book format. The audiobook was read by Nanette Savard, whose performance was praised by a reviewer for AudioFile, who stated: "Nanette Savard brings out the youth of the cats who are struggling to help their clan survive and to protect each other from outside danger". The book was also re-released in the UK on 29 September 2011, with different cover art.

== Critical reaction ==
Sunset managed to boost the Warriors series into second position on The New York Times Best Seller list in the children's series section. It also received praise from reviewers for Barnes and Noble, who said the book had an "addictive bite". A reviewer from Children's Literature compared the novel to a soap opera, with conflict after conflict. These conflicts, the reviewer noted, added depth to the novel. The reviewer closed by saying that while not well-written and difficult to understand without knowledge of previous books, Sunset was still entertaining. A second review, also by Children's Literature, was lukewarm, saying it had a "steady pace" but could be "more frustrating than satisfying" for readers. Booklist praised the book, saying, "As series fans will expect, the action here proves as compelling as the relationships between cats and the dynamics among the clans".
