= Long Shadows (Hunter novel) =

2008 novel by Erin Hunter

- Author: Erin Hunter
- Cover artist: Wayne McLoughlin
- Language: English
- Series: Warriors: Power of Three
- Genre: Children's literature Fantasy novel
- Publisher: HarperCollins
- Publication date: 25 November 2008
- Publication place: United States
- Media type: Print (Hardback)
- Pages: 364
- Preceded by: Eclipse
- Followed by: Sunrise

Long Shadows is a children's fantasy novel, the fifth book in Erin Hunter's Warriors: Power of Three, and was widely released on 25 November 2008. The book follows the adventures of Hollyleaf, Lionblaze, and Jayfeather. The book has sold over 250,000 copies.

== Plot summary ==
When Sol persuades almost all of ShadowClan to give up belief in StarClan, Tawnypelt takes her kits to ThunderClan, hoping to find refuge there, because she did not want to be part of a Clan that does not believe in StarClan. In hope of helping ShadowClan, Jaypaw, along with his siblings and Tawnypelt's kits, create a fake sign from StarClan to show Blackstar that StarClan is real. Blackstar is not convinced until the fake sign turns real when StarClan cats Raggedstar and Runningnose appear, and tell Blackstar to get rid of Sol.

A greencough outbreak begins in ThunderClan, and the Clan is short of the remedy, catmint. Jaypaw has a dream telling him there is a fresh supply in WindClan territory. Jaypaw asks Lionblaze to fetch the catmint. He gets the catmint and gives it to Jaypaw, but not without a tense encounter with his former friend Heathertail. Soon the Clan is healed and Jaypaw finally receives his full medicine cat name, Jayfeather.

Later, Jayfeather has a strange dream. In his dream, he has traveled back to a time before the Clans. The lake territories are inhabited by a group of cats who loosely resemble a Clan. Jayfeather awakes as a young cat called Jay's Wing. The cats, threatened by human expansion, hold a vote to move to the mountains. Jayfeather realizes that this group of cats will become the Tribe of Rushing Water, which in turn becomes the modern Clans, so he casts the deciding vote to send the group to the mountains in order to ensure the existence of the future Clans. He then awakes back in the present time.

During a storm, the ThunderClan camp catches fire, trapping Jayfeather, Lionblaze, Hollyleaf, and Squirrelflight. Squirrelflight manages to escape and tries to save her kits, but Ashfur interferes, separating Squirrelfight and the three. Squirrelflight begs him to let them through, but Ashfur insists that he never forgave her for choosing Brambleclaw over him. He says that he will now kill her kits in another attempt to hurt her. Squirrelflight then reveals a crucial secret: they are not her biological kits. Ashfur lets the three cats live, but he threatens to tell her secret.

The fire burns out and the camp is cleaned up. Three days before the Gathering, Ashfur asks Firestar if he can go. Hollyleaf, Lionblaze, Jayfeather, and Squirrelflight are worried that he is going to publicly announce their secret. Between then and the day of the Gathering, the three warn Ashfur that he will regret it if he reveals the secret, but he refuses to listen to them. Right before the Gathering, the patrol of warriors going notices that Ashfur is missing, and on the way, they see Ashfur's body lying in the stream next to WindClan territory as if he had drowned. They take him back to camp and have a vigil for him. However, Leafpool notices a gash in his neck, implying he was murdered. After the Gathering, Firestar announces that Ashfur's death was unknown and suspects a cat from WindClan may have killed him. The three vow to keep the recent events involving them, Squirrelflight, and Ashfur a secret.

== Reception ==
Horn Book Review said that Long Shadows moves very slowly, but that fans who have read the previous books would still enjoy it.
