= Dawn (Hunter novel) =

2005 novel by Erin Hunter

- First edition cover
- Author: Erin Hunter (Pen name of Kate Cary)
- Cover artist: Wayne McLoughlin
- Language: English
- Series: Warriors: The New Prophecy
- Genre: Children's literature Fantasy novel
- Publisher: HarperTrophy
- Publication date: 27 December 2005
- Publication place: United States
- Media type: Print (hardback & paperback)
- Pages: 368
- ISBN: 978-0-06-074457-1
- Preceded by: Moonrise
- Followed by: Starlight

Dawn is a children's fantasy novel, the third book in the Warriors: The New Prophecy series. Dawn was written by Kate Cary under the pen name of Erin Hunter. It was published on 27 December 2005 by HarperCollins. The book follows the adventures of the four warrior cat Clans after five questing cats return to the forest with a grave message to find a new home. Together, the Clans cross a mountain range and meet another group of cats, the Tribe of Rushing Water. At the end, a new territory is found beside a lake.

The book was first published as a hardcover in the US and Australia on 27 December 2005. The book was then released in paperback and e-book formats. Dawn has also been published in the UK, Canada, and China. Themes in the book include religion, conflicting loyalties, and cooperation. The book received mainly positive reviews, but some reviewers criticized the limited prose and number of characters.

== Synopsis ==
=== Setting ===
Dawn takes place in three places: the Clans' original forest territory, the mountain range inhabited by the Tribe of Rushing Water, and the lake territory located at the very end of the book. The forest in the beginning is divided into four territories for the four Clans: ThunderClan, RiverClan, WindClan and ShadowClan. The forest is based on New Forest, which is in Southern England. Later, the Clans wander into the mountains in search of their new territory. There, they meet the Tribe of Rushing Water who give the Clans shelter and food. While with the Tribe, the Clans realize that the Tribe's spiritual ancestors are the Tribe of Endless Hunting, not StarClan: through this difference, the theme of religion is explored. After the Clans leave the Tribe, they arrive at the lake territory which the Clans decide will be their new home.

=== Plot ===
Brambleclaw, Squirrelpaw, Crowpaw, Stormfur and Tawnypelt have returned to the Clans from a quest with a message from Midnight, the badger: the Clans must move to a new home, or risk death. The destruction of the forest has already begun, with the Clans starving as the food supply has been cut off and their habitat destroyed by the humans building a new road. At the same time, cats are being taken away by humans, including a ThunderClan apprentice, Leafpaw. A patrol is sent to rescue the captured cats, but Graystripe is captured after he succeeds in rescuing Leafpaw and other cats from RiverClan and WindClan, as well as many non-Clan cats.

It is difficult for Firestar, ThunderClan's leader, to convince ShadowClan and RiverClan to leave. Finally, RiverClan decides to leave when their river becomes poisoned by humans. ShadowClan also agrees to leave when a tree cut down by humans falls in their camp. While trying help ShadowClan, Firestar loses his second life when a tree falls on him. Midnight, an intelligent badger from the previous book, had told the questing cats that a dying warrior will show the Clans the way to their new home. The dying warrior turns out to be the spirit of Mudfur, the former RiverClan medicine cat. Mudfur runs through the night sky as a shooting star and drops behind the mountains, telling the Clans that their new territory will be beyond Highstones. The Clans travel together through the mountains, guided by Brambleclaw, Squirrelpaw, Crowpaw, Tawnypelt, and Stormfur.

While in the mountains, the Clans meet the Tribe of Rushing Water, and Stormfur chooses to stay with the Tribe with Brook Where Small Fish Swim, whom he has fallen in love with, and his sister, Feathertail's, spirit. Near the end of the book, Squirrelpaw confesses her love to Brambleclaw and he confesses that he loves her back. At the end of the book, the Clans discover a forest around a lake that reflects all of the stars. This was the place where StarClan had sent them.

== Publication history ==
The book was first published as a hardcover on 27 December 2005 in the US. The e-book version was released about a year later on 6 November 2007 and the paperback version was released on 14 November 2006. In the UK, the hardcover was released on 1 January 2006, a few days after the US version came out. The paperback version was released eleven months later on 1 December 2006. The Canadian version was released by Tween Publishing on 2 November 2006. Dawn was released as a hardcover in Australia at the same time as America on 27 December 2005. Similarly, the paperback and e-book version were released on the same day as the US, 14 November 2006 for the paperback and 6 November 2007 for the e-book. The Chinese version of Dawn was released on 30 March 2009 with a slightly different cover. 3-D cards featuring Leafpaw were packaged inside the books.

== Themes ==
Themes in Dawn include religion, conflicting loyalty, and cooperation. A reviewer from Children's Literature wrote that it "shows how difficult it can be for four separate and sometimes hostile groups to work together for a common goal, but also shows the rewards of that cooperation". This refers to how all four Clans, who used to fight each other for food, must suddenly help each other for a common goal. Religion and loyalty are explored when the Clans meet the Tribe of Rushing Water, and Stormfur is torn between the Clans and Brook where Small Fish Swim, as well as when the Clans realize that Tribe cats believe in the Tribe of Endless Hunting and not StarClan. The religion issue causes the Clan and Tribe to be slightly distrustful of each other because they do not understand each other. Series editor Victoria Holmes, however, has stated in an author chat that both the Clans and the Tribe are "equally valid" when it comes to faith.

== Critical reception ==
Dawn has been received warmly by several critics. In a review by Booklist, Dawn was said to be "eminently satisfying". A reviewer from Kirkus Reviews said that while the prose of the novel was bad, Dawn had a good plot. The reviewer also said that the author was able to make the reader care about the characters. A reviewer for Children's Literature commented on how difficult it was to not confuse the names, though it did praise the theme of cooperation in the novel. A reviewer for the Detroit Free Press also praised the book and recommended it to animal fable lovers and cat lovers. A review for both Dawn and Starlight from Horn Book Reviews included praise for Erin Hunter's ability to balance "multiple plot lines and points of view, creating a believable world".
