= Starlight (novel) =

2006 novel by Erin Hunter

- First edition cover
- Author: Erin Hunter
- Cover artist: Wayne McLoughlin
- Language: English
- Series: Warriors: The New Prophecy
- Genre: Children's literature Fantasy novel
- Publisher: HarperTrophy
- Publication date: 4 April 2006
- Publication place: United States
- Media type: Print (hardback & paperback)
- Pages: 352
- ISBN: 978-0-06-082762-5
- OCLC: 86112121
- Preceded by: Dawn
- Followed by: Twilight

Starlight is a children's fantasy novel, the fourth book in The New Prophecy arc of the Warriors series, written by Erin Hunter. The hardback was released on 4 April 2006 and in paperback on 27 March 2007.

== Development and publication ==
Starlight was written by Erin Hunter, a pseudonym for three women: series editor Victoria Holmes and authors Kate Cary and Cherith Baldry, who take turns writing installments of the series. The book was released on 4 April 2006 in hardcover. Starlight has been released as a paperback. It was also the first of the Warriors series to be released as an audiobook.

== Plot summary ==
The four Clans of warrior cats, ThunderClan, ShadowClan, RiverClan and WindClan, discover a lake which serves as their new home, replacing their old home which is destroyed by humans. The Clans temporarily set up camp by the lakeshore and decide that the next day, they will sort out their respective territories and look for a Gathering place to hold their monthly meetings under a truce. During a meeting, Firestar, leader of ThunderClan, calls up Squirrelpaw, and promotes her to the status of warrior, giving her the warrior name Squirrelflight. The next day, the leaders call upon the four remaining cats that go on the journey to the sun-drown-place in Midnight, Brambleclaw, Squirrelflight, Crowfeather, and Tawnypelt, as well as Mistyfoot of RiverClan to explore around the lake and find camps for each Clan.

The cats come across a location that seems ideal for RiverClan's fishing lifestyle. Continuing on, they find a coniferous forest which seems to suit ShadowClan. Desperate to prove herself by finding ThunderClan a camp, Squirrelflight runs ahead and accidentally falls down a large circular stone hollow. She recovers and realizes that it is a perfect place for a well-sheltered ThunderClan camp. The cats later cross a moorland which Crowfeather thinks suits WindClan's lifestyle of chasing rabbits. The five cats return and announce their findings to all of the other cats. The Clans decide to leave for their new camps the next day.

After the Clans move into their new camps, Barkface, the WindClan medicine cat, goes to Firestar and tells him that Tallstar, leader of WindClan, is dying. Firestar asks Brambleclaw to follow him as well as Onewhisker of WindClan at Tallstar's request. Tallstar tells them that he does not wish for Mudclaw, the WindClan deputy, to lead WindClan, and wishes for Onewhisker to succeed him instead. He dies soon after. The next morning, Firestar and Onewhisker announce this to the other Clans, much to Mudclaw's anger. Onewhisker appoints Ashfoot as his deputy, although he has not yet received his nine lives and leader name from StarClan, the cats' ancestors. The medicine cats worry about whether they will find another Moonstone (a sacred stone which they can use to communicate with StarClan, the souls of dead Clan cats) for Onewhisker to visit for his leadership ceremony.

During Gatherings and times when the Clans are together, Brambleclaw spends more time with his half-brother Hawkfrost, which does not sit well with Squirrelflight. Brambleclaw has a dream in which he sees Tigerstar, his deceased evil father, and Hawkfrost. Tigerstar praises Brambleclaw and Hawkfrost for their courage during the change in territory and tells them that he has great plans for them. There is also tension erupting in WindClan, which is divided in two groups between Mudclaw's and Onewhisker's supporters.

One night, Spottedleaf, a deceased former ThunderClan medicine cat, goes to Leafpaw, a ThunderClan medicine cat apprentice, and tells her to follow her. Leafpaw's friend Sorreltail accompanies Leafpaw, and the two of them go far up on ThunderClan's territory near the border with WindClan. Spottedleaf takes Leafpaw to her destination: a pool of water which reflects the stars and moonlight. Leafpaw sees all of the cats of StarClan and realizes this could be the replacement for the Moonstone. Bluestar, former leader of ThunderClan, tells her that this place, the Moonpool, is where medicine cats come to share tongues with StarClan. She goes back to tell Cinderpelt, ThunderClan's medicine cat, and the two of them tell all of the other medicine cats. Later, during the half-moon, Leafpaw receives her full medicine cat name, Leafpool.

The next day, Mistyfoot rushes into ThunderClan camp and says that Mudclaw and Hawkfrost have been meeting at night. She then says that Hawkfrost and a patrol went out at dawn that day and had not returned, and she suspects that they have gone to attack Onewhisker and his followers in WindClan. Firestar assembles a patrol to accompany him to fight, and sure enough, a battle starts on WindClan territory. Leafpool is left behind with a couple of other ThunderClan warriors in the camp. Two ShadowClan warriors invade and almost kill Leafpool when Crowfeather comes to her rescue. Crowfeather confesses he loves her, and she realizes she loves him too. During the battle, Brambleclaw fights Mudclaw. Although Mudclaw has the advantage over Brambleclaw, Hawkfrost saves Brambleclaw. Mudclaw claims that he and Hawkfrost had an agreement: as leader, Mudclaw would make Hawkfrost his deputy (despite the fact that Hawkfrost is from RiverClan) in exchange for assisting his coup. Hawkfrost denies this, before lightning unexpectedly strikes a tree, crushing Mudclaw to death. Onewhisker is hailed as WindClan's rightful leader, and the tree that killed Mudclaw has created a bridge to a nearby island, making it the new Gathering place for all four Clans.

== Critical reception ==
Starlight was received well by critics. A reviewer for School Library Journal called the novel "a fine rendition". A Children's Literature reviewer commented that the viewpoints of the characters were "cleverly written". AudioFile praised the narrator of the audiobook version of Starlight.
