= Warriors: Changing Skies =

Ninth arc in the Warriors series

- The Elders' Quest (2025); Hidden Moon (2025); Chasing Shadows (2026); Guiding Light (2026); False Dawn (2027); TBA
- Author: Erin Hunter
- Publisher: HarperCollins
- Published: 7 January 2025 — present
- No. of books: 6
- Preceded by: Warriors: A Starless Clan

Warriors: Changing Skies is the ninth sub-series ("arc") in Warriors, a juvenile fantasy novel series by Erin Hunter. The arc began publication in 2025, and is still ongoing, currently consisting of four (Note: Changing Skies will have six books, of which four have been published.) books. Changing Skies follows protagonists Moonpaw, Starlingpaw and Tawnypelt as the Clans deal with human presence on their territories. The series has received mixed reviews from critics.

== Publication history ==
- The Elders' Quest (7 January 2025)
- Hidden Moon (4 November 2025)
- Chasing Shadows (31 March 2026)
- Guiding Light (6 October 2026)
- False Dawn (30 March 2027)
- TBA

== Plot summaries ==
=== Series continuity ===
Changing Skies is the ninth Warriors sub-series ("arc"), set after the events of A Starless Clan.

=== The Elders' Quest ===
Cats of StarClan (the spirits of deceased Clan cats) debate which living cat to send a prophecy to. The prophecy warns of a cat with a paw in both worlds having the potential to go down a dark path. Meanwhile, humans have begun a building project which threatens the Moonpool (the living Clans' primary method of communication with StarClan), although only Tawnypelt of ShadowClan is worried by it. In ThunderClan, Moonpaw struggles with her warrior training, even temporarily training to be a medicine cat instead. A voice in her head, later revealed to be her dead sister, prevents her from concentrating on her training, but out of fear and shame she refuses to tell anyone about it. Meanwhile, SkyClan leader Leafstar's sight is failing, which leads to her misjudge an attack on a group of badgers, resulting in the death of Starlingpaw's father. Her Clan is upset and blames her. Following a vote, Leafstar steps down from leadership, intending for her second-in-command, Hawkwing, to take charge. At the end of the book, Tawnypelt receives the prophecy from StarClan.

=== Hidden Moon ===
While under SkyClan's care, Starlingpaw learns of the prophecy from Tawnypelt, and convinces himself that he plays a part in it. He begins to suspect several cats around him of wrongdoing. While Moonpaw continues to struggle with her sister's voice in her head, Tawnypelt temporarily stays in ThunderClan, concerned about Brambleclaw, her sick and elderly brother. The Clans decide to send a patrol of cats to visit the Tribe of Rushing Water in hopes of contacting StarClan through a cat who lives in both StarClan and the Tribe's afterlife. Taking Brambleclaw's advice, Moonpaw asks to learn about her sister from her parents, and hopes that showing love to Morningkit will make her want to move on to StarClan. While visiting the Tribe, Crowfeather learns of the prophecy as well, but chooses to keep it to himself. On their way back to the Clans, the journeying patrol is attacked by an eagle, which lifts Crowfeather into the air before dropping him, knocking him unconscious. Moonpaw's plan to get Morningkit to leave the living realm backfires, and Morningkit reveals she is able to physically attack Moonpaw.

=== Chasing Shadows ===
The questing cats discover that Crowfeather has entered a coma after falling from a height. Over the next few nights, Starlingpaw watches Crowfeather's spirit rise from his body and wonder aloud which of the questing cats is the one foretold to cause trouble for the Clans. Starlingpaw is alarmed by this, as Crowfeather had hidden this prophecy from the rest of the group. Eventually, Crowfeather awakes from his coma and the cats begin their journey back home. Starlingpaw reveals the prophecy to the other questing cats and later to all the clans at a Gathering, causing tensions to rise.

Moonpaw continues to be tormented by Morningkit, who is growing increasingly angry. A plan to take Morningkit to StarClan fails. Moonpaw wants to be mates with Goldenpaw, so a jealous Morningkit takes control of Moonpaw's body while the latter is sleeping and attacks Goldenpaw. Horrified, Moonpaw leaves ThunderClan to live on her own in the hopes of protecting others from Morningkit. Starlingpaw encounters her while she crosses SkyClan territory and sees Morningkit beside her. He concludes that Moonpaw is the cat foretold to cause trouble, and he escorts her out of Clan territory. Later, Goldenpaw is revealed to have followed Moonpaw out of ThunderClan because he loves her too.

After an argument with Tigerstar, Tawnypelt travels to meet the elders of all the Clans to see if they can help find an alternative to the Moonpool. She concludes that she needs to organize a quest to go to the Whispering Cave (an alternate method of communication with StarClan) in SkyClan's former home. After returning to ShadowClan and reconciling with Tigerstar, they receive news that humans have removed their construction materials from the Moonpool. Tawnypelt and several others travel to the Moonpool, only to find that human interference has destroyed its connection to StarClan and it is no longer useable.

=== Guiding Light ===
Tawnypelt and Leafstar travel with several other cats to SkyClan's former home, where the Whispering Cave is located. They find that the Whispering Cave's connection to StarClan is gone, and Leafstar dies of old age in SkyClan's old territory. The remaining cats venture back to the lake, but Tawnypelt decides to revisit the other Clans' old home, believing she might find answers there. She revisits the Moonstone, and takes a broken shard of it back home to the Clans, where medicine cat Frecklewish proclaims the piece may hold the answer to reconnecting with StarClan. The piece reveals no immediate solutions, and as the Clans worry more about humans encroaching closer to their territories, Tawnypelt wonders if a connection to StarClan could be found in the tree a group of wildcats use to contact their own ancestors.

Moonpaw and Goldenpaw encounter a group of cats living in a brewery on their travels, and spend several moons living with them, while Morningkit becomes less angry. When they leave the brewery, they give themselves warrior names: Moonglow, Goldenheart, and Brightmorning. Goldenheart wishes to visit his family in ThunderClan, so Moonglow reluctantly returns to the Clan with him. They do not intend to stay permanently, especially after Brightmorning takes control of Moonglow's body and begins attacking other cats to show her displeasure at being back in ThunderClan, but Jayfeather proclaims that Moonglow cannot leave, as she holds the answer to reconnecting to StarClan. Moonglow also discovers that she is expecting Goldenheart's kits.

Starlingpaw grows increasingly more restless in SkyClan. He begins to lie about defeating foxes and having visions from StarClan in order to get more of his Clanmates on his side, as he fiercely believes that SkyClan should return to their previous home, and that Hawkwing is not fit to be SkyClan's leader. He eventually earns his warrior name, Starlingflight.

== Critical reception ==
Kirkus Reviews wrote that The Elders' Quest is "a strong start to a new [Warriors] series", praising how it presents the main characters' "individual wrestling with personal issues". Hidden Moon was less well-received. Kirkus Reviews called it a "sluggish sequel", "named-clogged narrative", "ambling episode" and "uninspiring placeholder".

As of 9 February 2025, The Elders' Quest has been a New York Times Best Seller for three weeks. As of 23 November 2025, Hidden Moon has been a New York Times Best Seller for one week.
