= Sunrise (novel) =

2009 novel by Erin Hunter

- Author: Erin Hunter
- Cover artist: Wayne McLoughlin
- Language: English
- Series: Warriors: Power of Three
- Genre: Children's literature Fantasy novel
- Published: 21 April 2009 HarperCollins
- Publication place: United States
- Media type: Print (hardback)
- Pages: 352
- LC Class: PZ7.H916625 Ou 2008
- Preceded by: Long Shadows
- Followed by: The Fourth Apprentice

Sunrise is the sixth and final book in Erin Hunter's Warriors: Power of Three children's fantasy novel series. HarperCollins published it on 21 April 2009. The plot follows Jayfeather, Hollyleaf, and Lionblaze on their quest to find Ashfur's true murderer. It was originally to be titled Cruel Season, though this was changed because HarperCollins, the series' publisher, felt the name was too dark.

== Plot summary ==
Sunrise begins with Leafpool repeating a long-used ritual to send Ashfur to StarClan. During the process, she discovers a tuft of fur in Ashfur's claws, and she knows whose it is, although she does not say.

ThunderClan discusses Ashfur's murder, and many think that a WindClan cat killed him since he was found on the WindClan border. To find out, Firestar sends a patrol to WindClan but Onestar denies the possibility. As the patrol leaves, Ashfoot tells ThunderClan that she sighted Sol near the site of Ashfur's dead body, and this leads many cats to believe that Sol killed Ashfur.

Firestar sends Birchfall, Brambleclaw, Brackenfur, Hazeltail, Hollyleaf, and Lionblaze to the sun-drown-place to find Sol. The patrol finds Sol in the Twolegplace where Purdy, a friend of ThunderClan lives. Brambleclaw persuades Purdy to live in the Clan as an elder. Both Sol and Purdy agree to go to ThunderClan. When the patrol returns to the Clan, Sol denies killing Ashfur and is kept under guard in the camp.

Being the most curious of the Three, Jayfeather tries to find out who his true parents are. When asking about his birth, Mousefur reveals that Leafpool accidentally put a strange herb in Mousefur's tansy soon after Jayfeather's birth. After looking through herbs in the medicine cat's den and with herbs sticking to his pelt he goes to Mousefur to deliver some fresh-kill. Mousefur says that a certain herb sticking to his fur is the mystery herb, but Jayfeather does not know what it is. To find out, he asks Littlecloud when the medicine cats meet at the Moonpool. The ShadowClan medicine cat recognizes it as parsley, a herb that stops the milk of a cat whose kittens die. Jayfeather also remembers that on his journey to ThunderClan from his birthplace, there was another cat with him besides Squirrelflight: Leafpool, the true mother of the Three.

At the camp, Hollyleaf too learns that her mother is Leafpool by learning that Leafpool came back to the camp the day Hollyleaf and her littermates were born. In response, Leafpool tells the truth: Hollyleaf killed Ashfur, and the tuft of fur found in Ashfur's paw belonged to Hollyleaf.

Angered that StarClan is still keeping the father of the Three a secret, Yellowfang comes to Jayfeather in a dream and tells him, "The time for lies and secrets is over. The truth must come out. StarClan was wrong not to tell you who you were a long time ago," and leaves him a crow's feather, showing their father is Crowfeather of WindClan.

At the Gathering, Hollyleaf reveals the secret about her and her brothers' parents. Crowfeather denies that he ever has any kits besides Breezepelt, and he states that Leafpool and their kits mean nothing to him. Breezepelt and Nightcloud are both outraged about never being informed. Bramblestar is heartbroken by his mate Squirrelflight's deception, and breaks up with her, much to her distraught. Although Hollyleaf is glad she finally revealed the secret, Jayfeather and Lionblaze are both confused and angry. Seeing how everyone feels she did something wrong, Hollyleaf runs off. Jayfeather and Lionblaze chase her to the tunnels between ThunderClan and WindClan's territories. She runs into one of the tunnels, but before anyone can follow, it collapses on top of her and she is presumed dead.

Jayfeather realizes that only he and Lionblaze are part of the prophecy's Three. However, as he watches Whitewing's kits walking in the clearing, he realizes that one of the kits will be the third, being the granddaughter of Cloudtail, who is the nephew of Firestar.

== Reception ==
A lukewarm review from Children's Literature stated, "While the numerous characters may be confusing to those unfamiliar with the series, it will not take many pages for them to become enthralled with the adventures of the cats and anxiously be awaiting future books."
