= The Sight (Hunter novel) =

2007 novel by Erin Hunter

- First edition cover, featuring clockwise from top: Jaypaw, Lionpaw, and Hollypaw.
- Author: Erin Hunter
- Cover artist: Wayne McLoughlin
- Language: English
- Series: Warriors: Power of Three
- Genre: Children's literature Fantasy novel
- Publisher: HarperCollins
- Publication date: 24 April 2007
- Publication place: United States
- Media type: Print (hardback & paperback)
- Pages: 363
- ISBN: 978-0-06-089201-2
- OCLC: 123230802
- LC Class: PZ7.H916625 Sig 2007
- Preceded by: Sunset
- Followed by: Dark River

The Sight is a children's fantasy novel. It was published on 24 April 2007, and it is the first installment of the Warriors: Power of Three series by Erin Hunter. The book was recommended as Children's Summer Reading by the Washington Post Children's Book Club.

== Plot summary ==
In the prologue, it is revealed that near the conclusion of Firestar's Quest, a prophecy was sent to Firestar by a cat in StarClan. After a report of a fox and her cubs loose in ThunderClan territory, the three kits, Lionkit, Hollykit, and Jaykit, secretly leave camp and try to track down the foxes and help their Clan. They end up in trouble, but are saved by a patrol. A few moons later, Hollypaw becomes Leafpool's (the medicine cat) apprentice; Lionpaw becomes Ashfur's apprentice; and Jaypaw becomes Brightheart's apprentice. At a Gathering, all Clans have little to report. In the middle of the Gathering, two unknown cats appear. The Clans realize they are Graystripe, with a new friend, Millie. Graystripe was thought to have died when humans took him away in The New Prophecy. Instead, he managed to escape with the help of Millie, and found the new home with the help of Barley and Ravenpaw. It turns out all of the forest was destroyed. The Clans leave, and Graystripe and Millie return to ThunderClan, exhausted.

The return of Graystripe causes another problem. Firestar appointed Brambleclaw as the new deputy, assuming Graystripe had died, yet Graystripe was still alive. To help make the decision on who should be deputy, Firestar sends Leafpool to the Moonpool to talk with StarClan. Leafpool is told that Firestar needs to make his own choice. Jaypaw follows her and when Leafpool sees him, she is amazed. In the end, Brambleclaw stays as deputy since he knows the Clan (and the new territories) better.

When a battle with ShadowClan breaks out, Jaypaw can only defeat an enemy apprentice with the help of his sibling, telling him where the enemy is. Hollypaw finds the thrill of battling better than chewing up bitter herbs. Jaypaw likewise receives a dream from StarClan telling him he must become a medicine cat, because he has a gift to walk in other cat's dreams. Hollypaw and Jaypaw decide to trade roles, with Jaypaw becoming Leafpool's apprentice, with Hollypaw, Brackenfur's apprentice.

At the next Gathering, a dispute breaks out between the Clans. To solve the argument, Squirrelflight shares an idea: to have a special Gathering, just once. Each Clan would have their apprentices compete in different contests; tree climbing, hunting, and fighting.

Jaypaw is upset that he can't compete, and while staying behind at the camp, he has a vision. He is choking on earth and smells badger and fox. He is scrabbling desperately with his paws, until he realizes that he is seeing through Lionpaw's eyes. It turns out that, while competing, Lionpaw and Breezepaw fell into a collapsing badger set. Luckily, Jaypaw got there in time to save them along with Crowfeather. The leaders decide that since every Clan won at something, there would be a tie and no Clan would win.

In the end, Jaypaw walks in Firestar's dream and hears the prophecy, "There will be three, kin of your kin, who hold the power of the stars in their paws." Realizing that he and his siblings are the cats described in the prophecy, Jaypaw suddenly thinks "One day we will be so powerful that we shall command even StarClan!"

== Critical reaction ==
The Sight quickly mounted #1 on all major sales charts, including the New York Times Best Seller list. It was recommended as Children's Summer Reading by the Washington Post Children's Book Club. Booklist gave a positive review saying, "As in previous books, personal tensions are juxtaposed against dangers from the outside. Plenty of action and solid characterizations make this an enticing choice for fans of the long-running enterprise."

=== Awards ===
The Sight was nominated as the best Middle Readers book at Amazon's Best Books of the Year (2007), and placed sixth out of the ten nominees, with six percent of the total votes.
