= Warriors: A Starless Clan =

Eighth arc in the Warriors series

- River (2022); Sky (2022); Shadow (2023); Thunder (2023); Wind (2024); Star (2024)
- Author: Erin Hunter
- Publisher: HarperCollins
- Published: 5 April 2022 – 5 November 2024
- No. of books: 6
- Preceded by: Warriors: The Broken Code
- Followed by: Warriors: Changing Skies

Warriors: A Starless Clan is the eighth sub-series ("arc") in Warriors, a juvenile fantasy novel series by Erin Hunter. Consisting of six books, it was published between 2022 and 2024. A Starless Clan follows protagonists Nightheart, Sunbeam and Frostdawn, feral cats who live in Clans. A Starless Clan received mixed reviews from critics.

== Publication history ==
- River (5 April 2022)
- Sky (1 November 2022)
- Shadow (4 April 2023)
- Thunder (7 November 2023)
- Wind (2 April 2024)
- Star (5 November 2024)

== Plot summaries ==
=== Series continuity ===
A Starless Clan is the eighth Warriors sub-series ("arc"), set after the events of The Broken Code. It is followed by the ninth arc, Changing Skies.

== Critical reception ==
Kirkus Reviews wrote that "a major theme" of River is changing the Clans' code of honor for "whenever a feline Romeo-and-Juliet situation arises". Kirkus Reviews also wrote that River "maintains some of the charm of the series", but criticised it for "trying to pack too much into each chapter" and Curlfeather's "disturbing" death.

A different review by Kirkus Reviews wrote that a theme of Sky is dealing with xenophobia. It also praised Sky for "skillfully [using] the cats' conversations to fill in gaps for readers unfamiliar with the series" and "effortlessly balanc[ing] character traits and job descriptions equally among genders and ages".

Kirkus Reviews wrote that Shadow "gracefully incorporat[es] plot", and presents "finding one's calling and navigating relationships" well to an adolescent audience. It also commented that past chapter 16, the quality "plummets dramatically".

On 15 May 2022, River had been a New York Times Best Seller for four weeks. On 27 November 2022, Sky had been a New York Times Best Seller for two weeks.
