= Twilight (Hunter novel) =

2006 novel by Erin Hunter

- First edition cover, featuring Crowfeather
- Author: Erin Hunter
- Cover artist: Wayne McLoughlin
- Language: English
- Series: Warriors: The New Prophecy
- Genre: Children's literature Fantasy novel
- Publisher: HarperTrophy
- Publication date: 22 August 2006
- Publication place: United States
- Media type: Print (hardback & paperback)
- Pages: 336
- ISBN: 978-0-06-082764-9
- Preceded by: Starlight
- Followed by: Sunset

Twilight is a children's fantasy novel in the Warriors novel series written by Erin Hunter, a pseudonym used by multiple authors. It is the fifth book in the second arc The New Prophecy and continues the cat clans' adventures while seeking a new home. It was generally well received by critics.

== Plot summary ==
WindClan and ThunderClan are still suffering from Mudclaw and Hawkfrost's attack on WindClan. Squirrelflight and Ashfur grow much closer as Squirrelflight's relationship with Brambleclaw deteriorates because of his friendship with his half-brother, Hawkfrost, whom Squirrelflight believes is untrustworthy. Onewhisker of WindClan travels to the Moonpool, earning his nine lives and leader name, becoming Onestar.

Later in the book, Daisy, a farm cat, takes her three kits, Berry, Hazel, and Mouse, to join ThunderClan after Daisy witnesses the humans taking her friend Floss' kits away. Leafpool continues her forbidden love with Crowfeather a warrior of WindClan, and struggles with her feelings; she must choose between her Clan and her heart. Eventually, Cinderpelt confronts Leafpool about her romance when she is discovered with Crowfeather. The two medicine cats argue, and Leafpool decides to run away from the Clans with Crowfeather after Spottedleaf tells her to follow her heart. After a long night alone in the hills, Leafpool and Crowfeather return to the Clans when they hear of a badger attack on the Clans from Midnight the badger.

During the badger attack, Sorreltail begins to have her kits, and Cinderpelt helps her while simultaneously fighting off the badgers. Although Sorreltail gives birth to four healthy kits, Cinderpelt is killed by a badger. ThunderClan begins to lose the battle, but WindClan shows up at the last minute, summoned by Midnight. Together, the two Clans manage to drive the badgers away. The story ends with Leafpool deciding to remain in ThunderClan as their medicine cat, rather than leaving the Clans to live with Crowfeather.

== Critical reception ==
Twilight received a warm reception from critics. In one review by Barnes and Noble, the novel was praised for being eventful. A BookLoons reviewer also gave a positive review, but a Children's Literature reviewer said the story was confusing without background information.
