= Wayne McLoughlin =

Welsh artist (1944–2015)

- Born: 1944; Llanfrechfa Lower, Wales
- Died: 2015 (aged 70–71)

Wayne McLoughlin (1944–2015) was a Welsh artist who primarily depicted nature scenes. He was most known for his cover art in Erin Hunter's Warriors and Seekers series.

== Early life and education ==
McLoughlin was born in Llanfrechfa, Wales. As a child, McLoughlin enjoyed exploring Hampstead Heath, London, and later, the swamps of northern Florida. Fascinated by nature, he often recorded his experiences in sketches and paintings.

McLoughlin served in the United States Marine Corps during the Vietnam War before studying both Fine Art and Anthropology at San Diego State University.

== Career ==
He first worked on creating illustrated humor parodies for national magazines, including Esquire, Omni, Yankee, and National Lampoon. Beginning in 1989, McLoughlin created a series of satirical adds for American Cowboy magazine. He also published humorous musings and artwork in Field & Stream magazine.

He illustrated for Citibank, Ford Motor Company, IBM, Motorola, Adidas, Texaco, MasterCard, the National Geographic Society, Audubon, Scientific American, Woods Hole Oceanographic Institution, and the Nature Museum in Grafton, Vermont. His artwork can also be found in outdoor magazines such as Sports Afield and Sporting Tales, as well as many books and publications that focus on animals and aspects of nature, such as the bestselling Warriors and Seekers novel series.

The Internet Speculative Fiction Database credits McLoughlin with the cover art of dozens of books.

=== Illustrated books ===
- Bylinsky, Gene (1982). Life in Darwin's Universe: Evolution and the Cosmos. New York: Doubleday & Co.
- London, Jonathan (1993). Voices of the Wild. Crown.
- London, Jonathan (1995). Master Elk and the Mountain Lion. Crown. ISBN 0-517-59917-1.
- Dunphy, Madeleine (1996). Here is the Wetland. Hyperion Books for Children. ISBN 978-0-7868-2136-5.
- Hoffman, Alice (1997). Fireflies.
- Siebert, Diane (2000). Cave. HarperCollins. ISBN 0-688-16447-1.
- Libby, Larry (2001). Someday Heaven. Grand Rapids, Mich: Zondervan. ISBN 978-0-310-70105-7.

==== Warriors ====
- Hunter, Erin (2010). Battles of the Clans.

== Personal life ==
He lived with his wife, Jackie, in Bellows Falls, Vermont. Wayne died at age 71 in 2015.
