= List of Rosario + Vampire chapters =

The North American cover of Rosario + Vampire Vol. 1 released by Viz Media on June 3, 2008.

The Japanese manga series Rosario + Vampire is written and illustrated by Akihisa Ikeda. The series revolves around Tsukune Aono, a mediocre high school student who accidentally enrolls into Yokai Academy, a special school for monsters and demons. Upon his arrival, he meets Moka Akashiya, who is a vampire who takes a strong liking to the taste of his blood. He soon befriends other students: Kurumu Kurono, a busty succubus; Ginei Morioka, a werewolf; Yukari Sendo, a young genius witch; Ruby Tojo, another witch; and Mizore Shirayuki, a snow fairy, all of whom openly express their affections toward Tsukune. Throughout his freshman year, Tsukune encounters various antagonists such as the Protection Committee and the Anti-Schoolers, and later starts to undergo changes which will solidify his role as the link between the human and monster worlds.

Rosario + Vampire began monthly serialization in the August 2004 issue of Monthly Shōnen Jump. The first tankōbon was released by Shueisha on October 4, 2004. Each volume features a handful of four-panel bonus comic strips and author's notes. In the Volume 7 author's notes, Ikeda mentions that he was working with a new editor. In volume 9, Ikeda mentions that the series is going to be adapted into an anime series. The tenth and final volume was released on October 4, 2007, spanning 39 chapters during its run. The reason for the ending of the series was because Monthly Shōnen Jump had ended its 37-year run. A bonus chapter of Rosario + Vampire was serialized in the September 2007 issue of Weekly Shōnen Jump. The series is continued with Rosario + Vampire: Season II, a sequel that began monthly serialization in the November 2007 issue of Jump Square.

The manga is licensed in North America and the United Kingdom by Viz Media under its Shonen Jump Advanced imprint, and in Australia and New Zealand by Madman Entertainment, with the volumes released between June 3, 2008, and November 3, 2009. Individual chapters of the series are called tests, while each volume on the English releases are called lessons.

== Volume list ==
No.	Title	Original release date	English release date
1	Vampires; Gakuen no Banpaia (学園のバンパイア)	October 4, 2004; 4-08-873665-6	June 3, 2008; 978-1-4215-1903-6
1. "The School Vampire" (学園のバンパイア, "Gakuen no Banpaia"); 2. "Kurumu of Black Dreams" (黒い夢のくるむ, "Kuroi Yume no Kurumu"); 3. "Going Clubbing" (部活に入ろう!, "Bukatsu ni Hairō!"); 4. "Coexistence" (先輩とは仲よくね, "Senpai to wa Nakayoku ne")
Tsukune Aono, an average student who is unable to enter a regular high school because he flunked the entrance exams, enrolls at Yokai Academy and discovers it is a school for monsters where he is the only human. He is about to give up until he meets Moka Akashiya, a beautiful vampire who immediately takes a liking to him and becomes his friend. When other students threaten him and Moka, he finds that he can remove the rosary from Moka's necklace and have her transform into a powerful vampire. Rival classmate Kurumu Korono tries to attract Tsukune by charming him as a succubus, but Moka defeats her. When the clubs recruit members, Tsukune tries out the swim club, only to discover that its team members are deadly mermaids. He, Moka, and Kurumu join the Newspaper Club where they meet club president Ginei Morioka; a girl-chasing playboy who reveals to be a werewolf after he abducts Moka.
2	Witches; Tsuki ni Negai o (月に願いを)	February 4, 2005; 4-08-873776-8	August 5, 2008; 978-1-4215-1904-3
5. "Love is a Witch" (いたずらな恋?, "Itazura na Koi?"); 6. "The Art of the Birthday" (アートなバースディ, "Āto na Bāsudi"); 7. "Deadline!" (締切を守ろう!, "Shimekiri o Mamorō!"); 8. "Wish Upon the Moon" (月に願いを, "Tsuki ni Negai o")
Tsukune, Moka, and Kurumu meet Yukari Sendo, a young genius witch who initially despises Tsukune for liking Moka. After they help her against some school bullies, she becomes their friend (with some romantic interest in both Moka and Tsukune). As Moka takes time away from Tsukune for a secret project; Tsukune and the News Club learn about the disappearance of some girls. Tsukune discovers that the art teacher Hitomi Ishigami is behind the ploy, and has to rescue Moka from her wrath. When the paperwork for the News Club goes missing before their deadline, Kurumu finds herself being blackmailed into modeling for a photographer who has been stalking her. When the News Club distributes their first paper, the Security Committee confiscates the batch, leading Tsukune and the gang to a conflict with committee member Keito, who is a spider-woman.
3	Trolls; Buraddo (ブラッド)	June 3, 2005; 4-08-873823-3	October 7, 2008; 978-1-4215-1905-0
9. "The Secret" (秘密, "Himitsu"); 10. "The Gamble" (文句はないだろ?, "Monku wa Nai Daro?"); 11. "Blood" (ブラッド, "Buraddo"); 12. "Teach Me!" (勉強を教えて!, "Benkyō o Oshiete!")
The Security Committee, led by Kuyo arrest Tsukune amid allegations that he is actually a human. Moka goes to his defense, but Kuyo wants Tsukune to either admit guilt or fight him. The News Club, including Gin, arrive, but Kuyo transforms to a yōko (a fox demon) and fends them off to mortally wound Tsukune. Moka bites Tsukune and infuses him with her blood, which gives Tsukune vampire-like strength to defeat Kuyo. Afterwards, a wrestling student challenges Tsukune, but he is back to being a human. The wrestler transforms into a troll, so Moka infuses Tsukune once more. Tsukune gets tutored by a seductive math teacher who is intent on separating him from Moka, but he begins to lose his emotions.
4	Carnivorous Plant; Majo no Oka (魔女の丘)	October 4, 2005; 4-08-873869-1	December 2, 2008; 978-1-4215-1906-7
13. "Summer the Color of Sunflowers" (ひまわり色の夏休み, "Himawari-iro no Natsuyasumi"); 14. "City of Humans" (人間のまち, "Ningen no Machi"); 15. "Can't We All Just Get Along?" (友達になれたら, "Tomodachi ni Naretara"); 16. "Witch's Knoll" (魔女の丘, "Majo no Oka")
Tsukune and the News Club girls go on a field trip to the human world, where they are dropped off at a sunflower field known as the Witch's Knoll. Yukari saves herself and two young human women from attacking plant creatures. This offends the witch of the field, Lady Oyakata, who sends her ward Ruby Tojo to lure Yukari over to their anti-human cause. Yukari, who does not like the human world, agrees, but when Tsukune, Moka and Kurumu arrive, Ruby attacks them but is defeated by a transformed Tsukune. Ruby is shocked that she is nursed back to health by Tsukune and the girls; she retreats to the Knoll where Oyakata raises her plant army to destroy the humans. Tsukune and the girls try to stop them, at which Oyakata reveals the truth about the developers' plans for the field, which is to replace it with a garbage dump.
5	Abominable Snowgirl; Shinshoku (侵食)	February 3, 2006; 4-08-874024-6	February 3, 2009; 978-1-4215-1907-4
17. "Back to the Beginning" (回帰, "Kaiki"); 18. "A New Semester" (新学期, "Shingakki"); 19. "Girl of the Thaw" (雪解けの少女, "Yukidoke no Shōjo"); 20. "Corrosion" (侵食, "Shinshoku")
Oyakata battles Moka; she merges with her monster plants and tries to absorb Rudy and Moka, but is defeated when Moka destroys her grimoire. Tsukune is nominated for class president when he encounters snow girl Mizore Shirayuki who has taken an obsessive interest in him. She tries to take him away but Moka defeats her. When Mizore is suspected of freezing two male students and is in danger of being expelled, Tsukune tries to help her but faces the gym teacher who harbored a grudge against Mizore. After having taken on vampire blood from Moka, Tsukune now feels really strange, and a group of schoolmates called "Monstrels" try to take advantage of his seemingly weak situation.
6	Ghouls; Naitomea (ナイトメア)	June 2, 2006; 4-08-874116-1	March 10, 2009; 978-1-4215-1908-1
21. "Bad Blood" (コンプレックス, "Konpurekkusu"); 22. "A Kiss" (くちづけ, "Kuchizuke"); 23. "Ghoul" (屍鬼, "Gūru"); 24. "Nightmare" (ナイトメア, "Naitomea")
Mido of the Monstrels kidnaps Moka and challenges Tsukune to fight him. Tsukune frees the rosario from Moka, who tells him he needs to leave the monster world if he wants to stay human. Mido fights Moka, but releases a shower of water to exploit her weakness; Tsukune gets Moka to infuse him one more time. In that state, he defeats Mido but gets out of control as a ghoul. Moka tries to stop Tsukune by killing him, but Ruby intervenes. Tsukune's vampire powers are bound with a spirit lock by an exorcist. While Tsukune recovers in the hospital, Mako "The Cleaner" Yakumaru executes Mido for failing his mission and injects Moka with a hypnotic fluid and directs her to kill Tsukune.
7	Exorcist; Boku-tachi no Sentaku (ぼくたちの選択)	October 4, 2006; 4-08-874270-2	June 2, 2009; 978-1-4215-1909-8
25. "Scar" (傷跡, "Kizuato"); 26. "True Feelings" (素直なきもち, "Sunao na Kimochi"); 27. "I Promise" (約束するよ, "Yakusoku Suru yo"); 28. "The Choice" (選択, "Sentaku")
The hypnotized Moka tries to attack Tsukune but is stopped by Kurumu. Mako expresses her frustration by injecting others at the infirmary who rise to attack Tsukune. She injects Moka again but Moka is able to transform to Inner Moka, thanks to Tsukune, and defeats her. After noticing that Moka has been avoiding Tsukune, Kurumu confronts her about it, but they have to deal with Kiriya Yoshi and his two summoned cyclops. Tsukune begins to act a bit aggressive towards Moka because of his lust for her blood, but tries to hold back. After Moka faints and rests in the infirmary, Tsukune encounters and must fight a centipede monster alumnus that wants to eat him. After someone graffitis the school and assigns the blame to the News Club, Tsukune is called to the office where he is informed about a new antagonist group called the Anti-Schoolers and that he is on the verge of being expelled.
8	Shikigami; Gakuen no Yami (学園の闇)	February 2, 2007; 978-4-08-874324-0	August 4, 2009; 978-1-4215-1910-4
29. "The Dark Heart of the School" (学園の闇, "Gakuen no Yami"); 30. "The Plan" (計画, "Keikaku"); 31. "True Colors" (素顔, "Sugao"); 32. "Key" (鍵, "Kī")
In order to avoid expulsion, Tsukune agrees to work with the student council, led by Hokuto Kaneshiro, to help organize the school festival. He learns that there is an Anti-Schooler spy in the group, and a committee member accidentally reveals he is the mole. When Moka overhears Hokuto conspire with Kiriya, she tells Tsukune and the girls, but Tsukune does not believe her. He returns to the council room only to see that its members have been slaughtered by Hokuto, who reveals that he is the leader of the Anti-Schoolers. While Kurumu and Yukari help Tsukune, Ruby tells everyone that Moka has been captured by Kiriya. The girls capture Hokuto and deliver him to the headmaster, but it is a ruse as Hokuto easily frees himself, attacks the headmaster, and steals his rosary. Hokuto wants to break down the Great Barrier that separates the yokai from the human world. As Moka and Kiriya watch Tsukune fight Hokuto, Moka wants to help but she is placed in a chokehold by Kiriya. Moka musters the strength and will to break her own rosary chain.
9	Monster Mamas; Raihōsha (来訪者)	June 4, 2007; 978-4-08-874372-1	October 6, 2009; 978-1-4215-2354-5
33. "The Reason" (理由, "Riyū"); 34. "The Same Wish" (重なる願い, "Kasanaru Negai"); 35. "School Festival" (学園祭, "Gakuensai"); 36. "The Visitor" (来訪者, "Raihōsha")
Moka and Tsukune must fight Hokuto, who has transported to a room deep in the school to unlock the Great Barrier. Hokuto reveals that he was once a human too, but removes his own spirit lock and unleashes his monster form. Moka and Tsukune team up to defeat Hokuto. The News Club girls arrive and try to restore the barrier. Tsukune then uses his energy as Hokuto wakes up, but instead of attacking him again, Hokuto senses Tsukune's determination to save the world and offers his own energy. Afterwards, Hokuto and Kiriya leave the school as the festival begins. Tsukune meets Mizore's mother and Kurumu's mother, each of whom assumes he is dating her daughter. Moka feels isolated and escapes to the roof. She is assaulted by a Yakuza-looking guy, but Tsukune saves her. When Tsukune's cousin Kyoko Aono somehow manages to visit the school; Tsukune and the girls must scramble to act normal since Kyoko states if she senses anything strange, she will take Tsukune home. She is impressed when Tsukune defeats the delinquent guy, but when a big frog monster arrives, she flees.
10	Magic Mirror; Mirai no Katachi (未来のカタチ)	October 4, 2007; 978-4-08-874449-0	November 3, 2009; 978-1-4215-2355-2
37. "The Lilith Mirror" (リリスの鏡, "Ririsu no Kagami"); 38. "Snapshot of the Future" (未来のカタチ, "Mirai no Katachi"); 39. "The Promise of a Reunion" (再会の約束, "Saikai no Yakusoku"); 40. "Forecast of Happiness [Bonus Story]" (幸せの予感(番外編), "Shiawase no Yokan (Bangai-hen)")
While fleeing the frog monster, Kyoko opens the envelope, which reveals a magic mirror with a fairy named Lilith. She reveals the monsters' true selves by having them gaze at her mirror, but this also causes the monsters to lose control. Moka rescues Kyoko but Ishigami (who gave Kyoko the mirror) uses the mirror to transform many the students to their monster form. Moka fights Ishigami, but is too weak, but Tsukune helps defeat her. While the school has to be rebuilt, Tsukune returns home but Moka and the girls follow him and meet his mother. In a bonus story that takes place shortly after Tsukune's arrival at Yokai, Moka meets a fellow vampire who reminds her of an ancient vampire law that vampires can only love other vampires; both she and Tsukune must now question what kind of relationship they can really have with each other.
