= List of Rosario + Vampire: Season II chapters =

Cover of the first English volume of Rosario + Vampire: Season II as released by Viz Media on April 6, 2010.

Rosario + Vampire: Season II (ロザリオとバンパイア season II, Rozario to Banpaia Shīzun Tsū) is the sequel of the Japanese manga series Rosario + Vampire, written and illustrated by Akihisa Ikeda. The series follows Tsukune Aono and his monster friends, including the beautiful vampire girl Moka Akashiya, as they attend their second year at Yokai Academy, a school for monsters that was rebuilt following the events of the school festival the previous year. Season II introduces new characters and an organization called Fairy Tale to serve as an antagonist. It also delves into Moka's past with her family and the secrets of her rosario.

Rosario + Vampire: Season II began monthly serialization in the November 2007 issue of Jump Square, the successor to the now-defunct Monthly Shōnen Jump manga magazine where the first season was serialized. Its final chapter appeared in the March 2014 issue, and an epilogue chapter is planned for April. The first tankōbon was published by Shueisha on June 4, 2008, with a total of thirteen tankōbon available as of September 4, 2013. A second season of the Rosario + Vampire anime Rosario + Vampire Capu2, was produced by Gonzo and aired in Japan on TV Osaka and other networks between October 4 and December 24, 2008, but follows a different storyline from the manga.

Like the first season, Rosario + Vampire: Season II is licensed in North America and the United Kingdom by Viz Media under their Shonen Jump Advanced imprint, and in Australia and New Zealand by Madman Entertainment. The first English volume was published on April 6, 2010, with a total of thirteen volumes available as of August 5, 2014. As with the first series, individual chapters of Season II are called "tests", and each volume of the English releases is called a "lesson". The graphic novels each feature a two-page color insert of some of the characters, four-panel bonus comic strips, and author's notes. The English translation was done by Kaori Inoue up to volume 10, and by Tetsuichiro Miyaki as of volume 11. The English adaptation was done by Gerard Jones up to volume 8, and by Annette Roman from volume 9 onwards.

== Volume list ==
No.	Title	Original release date	English release date
1	Monster Fruit	June 4, 2008; 978-4-08-874506-0	April 6, 2010; 978-1-4215-3136-6
1. "A Brand-New Season" (あたらしい季節, Atarashii Kisetsu); 2. "Self-Study Class" (はじめての特別実習, Hajimete no Tokubetsu Jisshū); 3. "Superglue Girl" (粘着質少女, Nenchaku-shitsu Shōjo); 4. "Pride" (プライド, Puraido)
Tsukune Aono and the monster girls that like him start their second year at Yokai Academy as classmates. Yukari Sendo fashions an object that frees Moka Akashiya's inhibitions towards Tsukune. During the class self-study periods, Shizuka Nekonome takes Tsukune and the girls to a nearby area where they hunt monster durians. Tsukune meets new student Koko Shuzen, who is Moka's younger sister and who wants to fight the real Moka. When the News Club investigates a series of attacks on students, the trail leads to an underground dungeon area where Tsukune and Moka are ambushed by bandits.
2	Magical Candy	October 3, 2008; 978-4-08-874586-2	August 3, 2010; 978-1-4215-3137-3
5. "The Fake" (ニセモノ, Nisemono); 6. "Doppelgänger" (ドッペルゲンガー, Dopperugengā); 7. "Gro-Gro Drops" (すくすくドロップ, Sukusuku Doroppu); 8. "The Fearsome Kids" (恐るべき子供たち, Osorubeki Kodomo-tachi)
The bandit leader copies Tsukune's form and tries to impersonate him to fool his rescuers, but discovers they are all girls. As a doppelgänger, he copies Kurumu's abilities and fights them off until Tsukune unleashes his ghoul ability. As Ruby Tojo and Yukari quickly seal Tsukune's powers, the doppelgänger assumes Moka's inner form, but is no match for the real Moka. The News Club try to attract new members in the midst of club recruiting season. With Yukari's help, Koko tries out for different clubs, but is physically too little to be taken seriously. Yukari gives Koko a Gro-Gro Drop that turns her to adult size where she is able to show off against the Karate Club; however, the effects are brief and she reverts to a little kid. The other News Club girls come to her rescue by transforming themselves in the same manner.
3	Snow Oracle	February 4, 2009; 978-4-08-874637-1	December 7, 2010; 978-1-4215-3268-4
9. "Dance With Werewolves" (ダンスウィズウィアウルフ, Dansu Wizu Wiaurufu); 10. "Snow White" (スノウホフイト, Sunō Howaito); 11. "The Snow Oracle" (雪の巫女, Yuki no Miko; "Snow Priestess"); 12. "The Offering of the Flower" (花納め, Hana Osame)
Koko follows the trail of a mysterious prankster monster that has been terrorizing the girls on campus. She suspects Ginei Morioka the werewolf, but Gin reveals the true culprit. Mizore takes the gang to her Snow Fairy world where she is to participate in a coming-of-age ceremony. She isolates Tsukune and tells him that she wants to be with him, but is carried away by the Snow Oracle where she is arranged to be married to Miyabi Fujisaki, who couldn't care less about her feelings and wants. Tsukune and the other girls try to rescue her with Mizore's mother's help.
4	Inner Ghoul	June 4, 2009; 978-4-08-874679-1	April 5, 2011; 978-1-4215-3544-9
13. "Fairy Tale" (フェアリーテイル, Fearī Teiru); 14. "Something Important" (大切なもの, Taisetsu na Mono); 15. "Paradise" (楽園, Rakuen); 16. "The True Inner Self" (うらがわの素顔, Uragawa no Sugao); 17. "Dream of a Butterfly" (胡蝶の夢, Kochō no Yume)
Kahlua Shuzen arrives to enforce alliance negotiations between Fairy Tale and the Snow Fairy world, but as things do not go as intended, she goes into her crying tantrum and beats down everyone, including the News Club girls. She fights Moka but sustains heavy damage; Miyabi arrives and cancels her "kill everyone" orders and they retreat. Ruby takes Tsukune to another dimension where Tsukune trains in controlling his ghoul power, fighting with a special magic-cancelling whip while Ruby uses a chain to absorb his excess power. Moka steals the whip and, as her inner personality, goes on a date with Tsukune where the latter learns how to sense monsters. Tsukune and Moka have more sparring sessions. Koko helps Kurumu try to win Tsukune's affections by egging her to use her charm ability. Kurumu charms some boys, but Tsukune is inadvertently affected and Kurumu and Tsukune find themselves alone in Kurumu's dorm room.
5	Siren Song	October 2, 2009; 978-4-08-874745-3	July 5, 2011; 978-1-4215-3691-0
18. "Prelude" (年目の夏合宿, Nenme no Natsu Gasshuku; "Second-year Summer Camp"); 19. "How to Grow Up" (希望, Kibō; "Hope"); 20. "The Angel's Song" (天使のうた, Tenshi no Uta); 21. "Resonance" (想いを貫け, Omoi o Tsuranuke; "See Your Feelings Through"); 22. "A Midsummer Night's Dream" (いつかきっと, Itsuka Kitto; "Someday, for Sure")
When Tsukune's training with Moka seems to go nowhere, the Headmaster gives the News Club a summer break by sending them to the human world. Moka and a stoic girl named San Otonashi are kidnapped by yakuza, but Tsukune defeats the mobsters by using his improved fighting abilities. San, a former News Club president, works at the hotel where they are staying. The hotel's other employee (who was secretly working for the kidnappers) is ordered to burn the hotel, but steals the owner's bankbook and cash instead and flees. The News Club girls use their swimsuits and feminine charms to draw new customers to raise money. Meanwhile, Gin confronts the thieving employee as he is being punished by Rokuro Tsubaki, a Fairy Tale recruiter, who stuns Gin with a recording of a siren song. The 7th branch's boss, Kanade Kamiya, arrives to take San, but San's employer recognizes him as the one who killed her husband. The News Club tries to fight Kamiya but are held back by his siren song. As Gin and Haji raid the 7th Branch Office, San reveals that she is a siren too, and counters Kamiya's song with her own.
6	Gangstah	February 4, 2010; 978-4-08-870008-3	October 4, 2011; 978-1-4215-3831-0
23. "Mafia Boy" (マフィアの少年, Mafia no Shōnen); 24. "Sports Day" (平和な体育祭, Heiwa na Taīkusai; "A Peaceful Athletics Festival"); 25. "Heart to Heart" (イシンデンシン, Ishin-denshin; "Telepathy"); 26. "Weak Point" (ウイークポイント, Uīku Pointo)
With the start of the second trimester, Tsukune wonders about his future, but freshman transfer student Fangfang Huang, the son of a Chinese Mafia boss, tries to recruit him to join his family, having heard that Tsukune had destroyed the offices of both yakuza and Fairy Tale. Challenging Tsukune, he summons a phoenix that proves uncontrollable. At the school's sports day, Fangfang's jiangshi (hopping zombie) sister, Lingling, baits the News Club girls into wagering Tsukune's recruitment over which team wins, and brings her own jiangshi to compete in the events. Yukari makes a "heart-to-heart" device that enables people to share feelings, but when Fangfang plays with it they end up swapping bodies. Moka has been conversing with her inner self more often and agrees to let her spend a day out as a student. Although her academics and physical education classes are no problem, Moka's inner personality learns to cook for the first time, but afterwards they discover that she is unable to transform back.
7	Vanishing Acts	June 4, 2010; 978-4-08-870057-1	January 3, 2012; 978-1-4215-4026-9
27. "Reverse" (リバース, Ribāsu); 28. "Sweet Home" (スウィートホーム, Suwīto Hōmu); 29. "Fixing The Seal" (封印修復, Fūin Shūfuku); 30. "Eldest Daughter" (朱染家の長女, Shuzen-ke no Chōjo; "The Eldest Daughter of the Shuzen Family")
With the rosario broken, Moka agrees to travel to Hong Kong to meet with Fangfang and Lingling's great-great grandfather, Tohofuhai, one of the Three Dark Lords, in order to get her rosario repaired. During the flight, Tsukune and the gang must deal with a gremlin assassin from Fairy Tale that multiples itself to chew up the plane, causing it to crash. At the Huang manor, the girls are kidnapped, but it turns out to be a ruse to welcome Fangfang and his "new friends". Tohofuhai examines the rosario, but as he tries to crack its protection scheme, the seal rebounds and sucks in his soul, as well as Tsukune's and Mizore's. They end up inside Moka's mind, where they see memories that the seal is keeping from her. The memories include when Moka meets her eldest half-sister Aqua Shuzen for the first time, as well as Moka's mother, Akasha Bloodriver, who looks just like Moka's outer personality.
8	The Secret of the Rosario	November 4, 2010; 978-4-08-870122-6	April 3, 2012; 978-1-4215-4050-4
31. "Truth" (真祖, Shinso); 32. "Darkness Falls, a Star Is Born" (闇がおちて, 星うまれる, Yami ga Ochite, Hoshi Umareru); 33. "Treasure" (たからもの, Takaramono); 34. "The Secret of the Seal" (封印の秘密, Fūin no Himitsu); 35. "Confession" (告白, Kokuhaku)
Tohofuhai, Tsukune and Mizore continue to observe Moka's memories. On Moka's tenth birthday, Aqua reveals to Moka a monstrosity called Alucard, the First Ancestor vampire, who lies dormant beneath their manor. Akasha sends Moka away, and fights Aqua, who wants to drain all her First Ancestor blood to claim its powers. But when Moka returns and sees Aqua slice Akasha in half, she is enraged, but her subsequent power awakens Alucard, who attempts to absorb Moka. Akasha saves Moka by sacrificing herself to fuse with Alucard; she further protects her with the rosary which gives her a new pseudo-personality. Meanwhile, the Huang manor is visited by the rival Miao family led by Aqua; Kurumu uses her succubus powers to enter Moka's dream world to rescue Tsukune, Mizoe and Tohofuhai. Aqua faces Fangfang and Lingling's parents, but Lingling stands up to Aqua to try to buy some time while Kurumu extracts Tsukune and the others.
9	Fairy Tale	June 3, 2011; 978-4-08-870213-1	July 3, 2012; 978-1-4215-4209-6
36. "The Wounded" (傷ついてゆく者たち, Kizutsuite Yuku Mono-tachi); 37. "Reunion" (邂逅, Kaikō); 38. "Alliance" (同盟協定, Dōmei Kyōtei); 39. "Scenes #1" (それぞれの景色#1, Sorezore no Keichi #1); 40. "Scenes #2" (それぞれの景色#2, Sorezore no Keichi #2); 41. "Bond" (契り, Chigiri)
Lingling faces Aqua in a battle of Dimension Sword users. After Aqua evades Lingling's sacrificial attack, she is challenged by Tohofuhai, but when Fangfang and Lingling's parents are captured, Moka arrives and gives herself up to spare everyone from further harm. Hokuto and Kiria offer a temporary alliance with the News Club and provide information about Fairy Tale's headquarters. While the News Club members train, Tsukune undergoes a body alteration spell where he must endure 109 needle piercings so he can be powerful enough to defend against the Dimension Sword. Kurumu feels extremely weak and heartbroken due to her unrequited love for Tsukune. When Tsukune goes out of control and attacks Tohofuhai, Kurumu breaks through the shielding to finally kiss Tsukune, which restores him and allows Tohofuhai to insert the final needle.
10	Kidnapped	December 2, 2011; 978-4-08-870349-7	November 6, 2012; 978-1-4215-4879-1
42. "The Hanging Garden" (空中庭園, Kūchū Teien); 43. "Declaration of War" (宣戦布告, Sensen Fukoku); 44. "Executives" (the executive); 45. "Sorcerers" (M-agi); 46. "If My Love Reaches Him" (いつか伝わるといいな, Itsuka Tsutawaru to Ii na); 47. "Rear Guard"
The News Club enters Fairy Tale headquarters, known as the Hanging Garden, disguised as members of the organization. At a Fairy Tale gathering, they see Moka inside a magic seal, and that Fairy Tale plans to use her to awaken Alucard. Fairy Tale's leader, Gyokuro Shuzen, Moka's step-mother, senses them, and reveals the "moles" in front of everyone. Hokuto advises them to retreat, but they refuse, so Hokuto flees on his own. Gyokuro sends the division leaders after the infiltrators; the group encounters Raika, who specializes in lightning attacks, first. Ruby fights him and gets electrocuted; however, she enjoys it, and counters with some summonnings and an explosive spell. Raika changes into his monster form, causing Ruby to resort to her ultimate Iron Maiden attack. Fangfang separates from the group, taking on deputy division leader Ludie, who attacks him with a chainsaw. Yukari helps Fangfang and he is able to defeat Ludie. However, Xilong Miao, Ludie's boss and leader of the Miao family, then arrives on the scene.
11	Rescue Mission	June 4, 2012; 978-4-08-870425-8	March 5, 2013; 978-1-4215-5240-8
48. "Talent"; 49. "Puppet Master"; 50. "Dark Reunion"; 51. "Curse"; 52. "Transformation"; 53. "Replica"
Xilong uses his flower-based attacks against Fangfang, but Yukari protects him with summonings. When Yukari begins to tire, Fangfang uses his martial arts skills to defeat Xilong, who then reveals that his father was killed by the Masked King, who forced the Miao family to align with Fairy Tale. Tsukune and the gang encounter Miyabi, but Kiria arrives and sends Tsukune and Ruby to another dimension where they must face Kuyo, who is now a Fairy Tale leader. In the meantime, Miyabi holds off Kiria, allowing Kurumu and Mizore to reach Moka; however, Aqua blocks their path. Despite their ultimate anti-vampire joint attack, Kurumu and Mizore are badly wounded by Aqua, shocking Moka to the point where the seal breaks and frees her inner personality.
12	Awakening	February 4, 2013; 978-4-08-870570-5	October 1, 2013; 978-1-42-155702-1
54. "His Goal"; 55. "Battling the Dimension Sword"; 56. "Lost"; 57. "Rock n' Roll #1"; 58. "Rock n' Roll #2"; 59. "The Black Parade"
Moka's inner personality awakens but attacks Aqua for both hurting her friends and assuming that Tsukune has been using her for protection. Alucard starts to wake, destroying much of the Hanging Garden and devouring members of Fairy Tale. Tsukune successfully counters Aqua’s Dimension Sword, and he and Moka knock Aqua out. When Gyokuro and Kahlua arrive, Gyokuro grabs Moka's rosario and attaches it to a device to control Alucard. As Tsukune’s allies arrive (along with Hokuto), Koko fights Kahlua, but Gyokuro summons the Shuzen family assassination squad to fight the others. Issa Shuzen faces Master Tohofuhai as Gin and Haiji (now revealed to be a Crow Tengu) battle the Shuzen family. Gyokuro reveals that she has infected the Shuzen family members with bits of Alucard, turning them into ghouls after they are defeated by Gin and Haiji. Moka learns that her blood is in sync with Alucard as Tsukune begins to transform into a ghoul, but Tsukune unleashes his second spirit lock as he wipes out the ghouls and prepares to confront Gyokuro.
13	Alter Egos	September 4, 2013; 978-4-08-870812-6	August 5, 2014; 978-1-42-156949-9
60. "Dark Side of the Moon"; 61. "Countdown"; 62. "We're Not Alone"; 63. "Last Waltz"; 64. "If Only We Could Start Over Again"; 65. "The End of the World"
Tsukune has resolved to defeat Gyokuro, even at the cost of his humanity. Despite her Enemy Zero ability, which allows her to duplicate any kind of attack, Gyokuro is defeated by Tsukune; she fuses with Alucard in an attempt to become stronger. Gyokuro then reveals that she has set the Hanging Garden on course to crash into the human world. When she attempts to kill Moka, Gyokuro finds herself frozen and unable to act. Tohofuhai reveals that the rosario links to Akasha's essence within Alucard and that a mother protects her daughter. Moka retrieves her rosario from Gyokuro, who is then consumed by Alucard. In her battle against Koko, Kahlua removes her second limiter to become malleable as liquid, but a Black-and-White Duet attack by Kurumu and Mizore using Holy Water freezes her powers, allowing Koko to fatally stab her. Kahlua reveals her and Gyokuro's motivations and asks for forgiveness. Bus Driver stops the Hanging Garden from falling, and Outer Moka is restored. The Masked King appears and reveals himself to be Miyabi and a clone of Alucard. He also reveals that Aqua had a best friend, Jasmine, also a vampire, who was killed by humans and whose death sparked Aqua's hatred of humanity. As a result, Aqua allied with him since they shared a common goal of eradicating all humans, but she decides to side with Moka. Aqua slices Miyabi to pieces, but he reforms since a clone can't die unless the original Alucard is destroyed. Miyabi summons impaling spikes, piercing Moka in the process, and the Hanging Garden continues its descent into the human world.
14	Transfusion	May 2, 2014; 978-4-08-880049-3	May 5, 2015; 978-1-42-157967-2
66. "Dawn of the Dark"; 66.6. "Epilogue"
When Aqua is unable to save Moka, Tsukune breaks off his Spirit Lock and becomes a true vampire to infuse his blood with Moka's. Alucard's true form proves too strong for human armed forces to overcome, but San Otanashi's Siren Song is able to hold him back, providing time for Mikogami and Tohofuhai to launch an attack. Using a magic circle created by Aqua (who now respects Tsukune), Kurumu, Mizore and the others are able to reach Tsukune and Moka in the vortex created by Tsukune's unleashing his vampire power. Tsukune, now a full True First Ancestor vampire, and Moka, fully restored, lead a combined attack against Alucard, but Alucard's master plan and victory seem inevitable as the eggs he planted all over Japan begin to hatch. With the human world watching, Tsukune leads the gang (now joined by Gin, Haiji, Lingling, Xilong Miao and Ludie) in another attack as all of the monsters of Yokai Academy (and Mrs. Kurono, Shiryaku and Sendo) destroy the hatchlings. Tsukune plants Moka's rosario on Alucard's chest, awakening and releasing Moka's mother Akasha Bloodriver, who convinces Alucard to end the destruction; after Akasha bids farewell to Tsukune, she and Alucard cast a Self-Disintegration Spell aided by Tohofuhai and Mikogami, which destroys all four of them. With the world now aware of the existence of monsters, Tsukune chooses to return to Yokai Academy with his friends, where he will train (under Moka's father Issa Shuzen) to someday become the new headmaster and see the dream of a co-existing human-monster world fulfilled.
