= Ginei =

Ginei may refer to:

- Uiryeong County, in South Korea, known as Ginei from 1910 to 1945
- Ginei Morioka, a character from the Japanese comic book series Rosario + Vampire
