= Akashiya =

Akashiya is a surname. Notable people with the surname include:

- Sanma Akashiya (born 1955), Japanese comedian, television personality, and actor
- Moka Akashiya, fictional character
