= List of Rosario + Vampire episodes =

Japanese anime television series

Rosario + Vampire
- The first DVD volume of Rosario + Vampire season 1 was released by Gonzo on April 25, 2008.
- Native name
- Kanji: ロザリオとバンパイア
- Revised Hepburn: Rozario to Banpaia
- No. of episodes: 26

Release
- Original network: Tokyo MX, CTC, tvk, TVS, TVO, TVA, RAB, Kids Station
- Original release: January 3 – December 24, 2008

Rosario + Vampire is a Japanese anime series based on the manga series of the same title written and illustrated by Akihisa Ikeda. The story revolves around Tsukune Aono, a boy with poor grades who accidentally enrolls into Yokai Academy, a special school inhabited by monsters, and demons where humans are not allowed. There he encounters the vampire Moka Akashiya who is attracted to his blood's sweet taste. While trying to hide his human identity, he meets other girls who take a romantic interest in him. The anime is loosely based on the first nineteen chapters of the manga and focuses more on the romantic comedy aspect and the "monster of the week" motif that was previously featured in tokusatsu shows, as well as some rare occasions of breaking the fourth wall. The second season is loosely based on the Rosario + Vampire: Season II manga, focusing on Tsukune and the girls' second year at Yokai Academy and introducing characters from the second serialization as well as new anime-only characters, as with the first season. The series became notorious for its excessive use of fanservice, mainly in the form of panty shots, which resulted in the second season being censored on two networks, as well as angering many fans of the original manga.

Two seasons, consisting of thirteen episodes each, were produced by Gonzo under the directorship of Takayuki Inagaki. The first season, Rosario + Vampire, originally aired on Tokyo MX, Chiba TV, and TV Kanagawa between January 3 and March 27, 2008. Six DVD compilation volumes were released between April 25 and September 26, 2008, and a DVD/Blu-ray box set was released on January 29, 2010. The second season, Rosario + Vampire Capu2, aired 13 episodes on TV Osaka from October 1 to December 24, 2008, with several other stations starting from October 2 to December 30, 2008. Six DVD volumes were released between December 21, 2008, and May 22, 2009, and a DVD/Blu-ray box set was released on March 19, 2010. The anime is licensed in North America by Funimation Entertainment, and it released both seasons on December 20, 2011. The anime is also licensed in Australia and New Zealand by Madman Entertainment, who've released both seasons in 2012.

Four pieces of theme music were used for the series. The opening theme for the first season is "Cosmic Love", while the ending theme is called "Dancing in the Velvet Moon". The opening theme for the second season is "DISCOTHEQUE" while the ending theme is "Trinity Cross". The four pieces are performed by Nana Mizuki.

== Series overview ==
Season	Episodes	Originally released	
Season	Episodes	First released	Last released
1	13	January 3, 2008	March 27, 2008
2	13	October 1, 2008	December 24, 2008

== Episode list ==
=== Rosario + Vampire (2008) ===
No.	Title	Original release date
1	"New Life and a Vampire"; Transliteration: "Shinseikatsu to Banpaia" (Japanese: 新生活とバンパイア)	January 3, 2008
Average student Tsukune Aono does not get accepted into any local high schools but his parents are more than happy to have him enroll in the boarding school Yokai Academy after his father had a lucky encounter with a drunk man in a white monks robe. He encounters and befriends Moka Akashiya, a vampire that becomes enchanted by the scent of his human blood. However, he discovers that Yokai is a school for monsters. According to the school rules, the students must retain their human forms on academy grounds and any humans who manage to get past the schools magic protection barrier are to be executed. Tsukune tries to run away from the school but has a confrontation with Moka. A fight with a delinquent student named Saizo Komiya quickly endangers Tsukune's life right before he accidentally removes the rosary on Moka's neck, which transforms Moka into a powerful vampire with silver hair that easily defeats Saizo. Afterward, he wakes to find the pink-haired Moka caring for him and wanting another drink from his neck.
2	"Succubus and a Vampire"; Transliteration: "Muma to Banpaia" (Japanese: 夢魔とバンパイア)	January 10, 2008
After learning that the bus driver only makes trips to and from the academy once a month, Tsukune tries not to draw any attention to himself, but Moka is more than happy to greet him affectionately, drawing jealousy from the other students, including the popular succubus student Kurumu Kurono. After Tsukune remarks that Moka is only using him for his blood, Kurumu seduces Tsukune by putting him in a trance, but Tsukune manages to break the spell. An enraged Kurumu tries to kill him, but Moka arrives and saves him. After Tsukune removes Moka's rosary, Moka easily defeats Kurumu, but Tsukune spares Kurumu from further harm. The next day, Tsukune and Moka are shocked to see Kurumu has fallen in love with Tsukune.
3	"Witchling and Vampire"; Transliteration: "Majokko to Banpaia" (Japanese: 魔女っ子とバンパイア)	January 17, 2008
The crush that the young, smart witch Yukari Sendou has on Moka drives her to endeavor to isolate her from Tsukune through various and often humorous pranks. Among these, she tries to make Moka believe that Tsukune is making sexual advances on Kurumu, who does not seem to care whether it is a prank or not. Yukari apparently does not care about making friends, given the fact that she was looked down upon by everyone. Later on, as Yukari goes outside, she is confronted by a lizardman named Tadashi Wanibuchi and his two subordinates who are intolerant of witches due to how close they are to being human. Moka, Tsukune, and Kumuru each arrive to help Yukari. After Tsukune is injured while protecting Yukari, he removes the rosary from Moka's neck before fainting. Moka's inner self easily takes out the trio of lizardmen. Yukari quickly finds that Tsukune is a true friend and vows to turn over a new leaf. The next day Yukari declares that she now loves Tsukune just as much as she loves Moka.
4	"Farewell and a Vampire"; Transliteration: "Sayonara to Banpaia" (Japanese: さよならとバンパイア)	January 24, 2008
The Fan Club Coalition naively believe that Tsukune is the reason why Moka, Yukari, and Kurumu do not pay them any attention. Tsukune is despondent over the fact that he cannot protect the girls the way that they protect him due to his lack of strength. Moka becomes convinced Tsukune is trying to return to the human world. At the bus stop, the fan club attack Tsukune, but the three girls step in and save him. After the fanboys combine themselves, Tsukune removes the rosary from Moka's neck to awaken her inner self, which allows all the girls to take out the three fanboys. The girls learn that Tsukune only wanted the bus driver to deliver the letters he wrote to his family and Moka had simply overreacted. Tsukune learns that the bus driver will now come once a day and that phones have been installed in the student lobby can reach the human world.
5	"School Swimsuits and a Vampire"; Transliteration: "Sukūru Mizugi to Banpaia" (Japanese: スクール水着とバンパイア)	January 31, 2008
Tsukune and Moka are having a hard time choosing an extracurricular club to join until Tsukune, hoping to see Moka in a bikini, decides on joining the swimming club hosted by mermaids. Moka becomes jealous as she watches Tsukune being flirted with Tamao Ichinose, the head of the swimming club. However, what Tsukune does not know is that Moka has aquaphobia, since water drains her vampire powers due to its purifying effects. During a swim meet, Kurumu and Yukari, who joined the swimming club with Tsukune, try to garner the most attention through the events. As Tamao tries to isolate Tsukune for herself, he sees the other mermaids preying on the other male club members. Moka arrives to save him and jumps into the pool, electrocuting herself. As Kurumu and Yukari hold off the mermaids, Tsukune swims to the bottom of the pool and removes the rosary on Moka's neck. Moka's inner self emerges and, due to being weakened by the water, tricks Tamao into leaping out of the water so she can give her a good kick. Inner Moka then reprimands Tsukune for not understanding Outer Moka and for making her cry. The next day, Shizuka Nekonome, the homeroom teacher, recommends Tsukune, Moka, Kurumu, and Yukari join her Newspaper Club instead.
6	"Newspaper Club and a Vampire"; Transliteration: "Shinbunbu to Banpaia" (Japanese: 新聞部とバンパイア)	February 7, 2008
During the first meeting of the Newspaper Club, Tsukune and company are introduced to Ginei Morioka, who uses his superficial charm to crowd out Tsukune, framing him as a mysterious peeping tom who has been photographing the girls around school. As Kurumu and Yukari work to illuminate the real culprit and clear Tsukune's name, Moka ponders who Tsukune truly is in her heart. Ginei later tries making a move on Moka, but Kurumu and Yukari point out several flaws in Ginei's story, proving he is the peeping tom. Ginei shows his true colors and form as a werewolf almost as powerful as a vampire, but as Tsukune comes to protect Moka from harm, he removes the rosary on Moka's neck. Ginei finds that he cannot outrun or outwit Moka's inner self. The next day, they put out fliers exposing Ginei's actions and clearing Tsukune's name. While Ginei is chased by all the girls he took pictures of, Moka kicks Tsukune after he nearly looks up her skirt and ends up sucking his blood again.
7	"Snow Girl and a Vampire"; Transliteration: "Yuki-onna to Banpaia" (Japanese: 雪女とバンパイア)	February 14, 2008
As Tsukune and the others from the Newspaper Club hand out the paper to the students, a snow girl named Mizore Shirayuki appears and takes an immediate liking to Tsukune. Seeing him as a lonely kindred spirit that needs companionship, Mizore tries to isolate Tsukune for herself, but Moka and Kurumu prevent that from happening. Mizore later finds herself in danger of expulsion because Okuto Kotsubo, the physical education teacher, accuses her of attacking him without cause. Ginei ends up clearing Mizore's name by showing photos he took of Kotsubo in his kraken form trying to take advantage of Mizore. As Mizore expresses her loneliness, Tsukune prevents Mizore from falling off the cliff into the ocean. As Moka reaches for Tsukune, he removes the rosary on Moka's neck. Moka's inner self punishes Mizore and tells her to try living her life before thinking of dying. Mizore returns the next day with a new haircut. Ginei is beaten up for continuing to take secret photos of female students. Tsukune, Moka, and Kurumu end up catching colds from Mizore's ice magic.
8	"Math and a Vampire"; Transliteration: "Sūgaku to Banpaia" (Japanese: 数学とバンパイア)	February 21, 2008
The beautiful math teacher Ririko Kagome will be giving midterms soon, but Tsukune is falling behind the others and may end up in summer school if he fails the midterms. Tsukune has math tutoring sessions with the girls, and Moka offers her notes for him to study. However, this draws the attention of Ririko, who insists Tsukune be given extra lessons with her instead. Unfortunately, Tsukune's unusual proficiency in math from these lessons comes at the cost of his personality. Moka finds out that Ririko is a lamia who is trying to seduce Tsukune with her serpent body whilst forcing mathematical formulas into his mind. After Ririko attacks Moka, the latter's notes splatter onto the floor, which brings Tsukune back to his senses. After he removes the rosary on Moka's neck, Moka's inner self easily defeats Ririko. The next day, Tsukune manages to pass the midterms, thanks to Moka's notes. Yukari aces her tests, Mizore barely gets by, and Kurumu fails miserably.
9	"Summer Break and a Vampire"; Transliteration: "Natsuyasumi to Banpaia" (Japanese: 夏休みとバンパイア)	February 28, 2008
While on summer vacation in the human world with Nekonome as their chaperone, fun in the sun on a beach for the Newspaper Club gives way to a field of sunflowers on a hill that Tsukune discovers. He does not realize that there are a pair of witches residing there that make no distinction between them and the land developers that covet that area. Feeling left out by the others due to her young age, Yukari encounters Ruby Tojo later that night, pleasantly surprised to see another witch. As Yukari is pondering whether to join Ruby and her guardian, later recognized as Lady Oyakata, Tsukune arrives to escort her back to the others. Ruby tries to attack Tsukune with plant monsters, but Yukari slices them to pieces. Just as Yukari leaves with the others, Ruby critically wounds Tsukune, giving Moka, Kurumu, and Mizore the incentive to fiercely attack Ruby.
10	"Sunflowers and a Vampire"; Transliteration: "Himawari to Banpaia" (Japanese: ひまわりとバンパイア)	March 6, 2008
After Ruby awakens to find herself in a tent with Tsukune and the other girls, she explains how badly witches have been treated and how developers are planning to destroy the sunflower field. After hearing her story, Tsukune and the other girls invite her to join the club and attend the academy with them. Seeing how kindly Tsukune and his friends treat each other, Ruby starts to have doubts that drive her to later sneak out that night back to Oyakata. When Tsukune and the other girls rush into the sunflower field to search for her, Ruby instigates a massive battle with plant monsters. Both Tsukune and Moka are trapped within the field when the others fend off the plant monsters. Tsukune removes the rosary on Moka's neck, and Moka's inner self takes on Ruby alone but to no avail. Ruby learns from Tsukune that Oyakata had died, but Ruby is in denial. Ruby uses a forbidden spell to attack them, but with their combined effort, they manage to destroy the spell. As Ginei and Nekonome arrive the next day, it is revealed that Ruby has survived the blast.
11	"New Term and a Vampire"; Transliteration: "Shingakki to Banpaia" (Japanese: 新学期とバンパイア)	March 13, 2008
As summer vacation has ended, a new term at the academy has started. However, as the Newspaper Club is working on its next edition, this rouses Keito, a member of the powerful and corrupt Security Committee, who is trying to disband the Newspaper Club through competition. Ginei orders the club not to distribute any more newspapers, telling Tsukune and Kurumu to burn them in the incinerator. The two encounter Keito and her three minions. She attacks them in her jorōgumo form, but the other girls arrive to save them. Tsukune removes the rosary on Moka's neck, and Moka's inner self easily repels the assault, tying Keito and her minions up in their own spiderweb. Nonetheless, the destructive resolve of the Security Committee against the Newspaper Club is strengthened and amplified with just as much ease.
12	"Security Committee and a Vampire"; Transliteration: "Kōan'iinkai to Banpaia" (Japanese: 公安委員会とバンパイア)	March 20, 2008
The Newspaper Club attempts to collect evidence of the Security Committee's corruption. However, this causes Tsukune to be arrested by Kuyo, the leader of the Security Committee, suspecting Tsukune is a human. Moka, Kurumu, and Mizore are also arrested for knowing Tsukune was a human. After hearing testimonies from several students and staff, as well as the coercive questioning with the three girls, Tsukune is forced to admit being human. Now that his confession is community knowledge within the academy, Moka is jailed for being an accessory to his deception, Kuyo sentences Tsukune to death. Kurumu and Mizore relay this disbelieving yet shocking news to Yukari and Ginei. What happens to Tsukune is left hanging in the balance.
13	"Tsukune and a Vampire"; Transliteration: "Tsukune to Banpaia" (Japanese: 月音とバンパイア)	March 27, 2008
Ruby, first disguised in the form of a crow, gathers the other four girls together to fight against the Security Committee and rescue Tsukune from being executed. After Tsukune is reunited with Moka, it is then that Kuyo severely injures Tsukune with his flames. As his body goes limp, he removes the rosary from Moka's neck. Although Moka's inner self prepares to inject her blood into Tsukune, Kuyo returns in the form of a fox demon and quickly dispatches all attempts to be defeated by the rest of the group. To make matters worse, as she charges to attack, Moka's inner self realizes that giving up her blood to save Tsukune has weakened her greatly. Somehow Tsukune is miraculously revived and saves Moka's inner self from being burned. With Ginei's help, Moka's inner self beats Kuyo unconscious. Tsukune is mistakenly given credit for beating Kuyo, something no human could have possibly done, and is allowed to stay at the academy with everybody believing he is a monster again. Moka, after spending time recovering in the infirmary, awakes when she is visited by Tsukune. She tries to kiss him, but the other girls arrive and try to get him to kiss them, much to his horror.

=== Rosario + Vampire: Capu2 (2008) ===
No. overall	No. in season	Title	Original release date
14	1	"Reunion and a Vampire"; Transliteration: "Saikai to Banpaia" (Japanese: 再会とバンパイア)	October 1, 2008
As Tsukune Aono begins his second year at the academy, he relives the moment he first arrived the previous year. However, he instead briefly encounters an orange-haired mysterious girl, who is a vampire that likes the scent of his human blood. He reunites with Yukari Sendou, Kurumu Kurono, Mizore Shirayuki, and finally Moka Akashiya. All the girls have gained popularity and have received fan letters from incoming freshman girls. Moka, who has received the most amount, discovers a bat-shaped letter, of which this writer intends to end her life very soon, much to her anxiety. These bat-shaped letters appear a few times throughout the day and several times during the night. During the entrance ceremony the following day, the mysterious girl picks a fight with two upperclassmen. During this time, Tsukune removes the rosary from Moka's neck, allowing Moka's inner self to stop the fight.
15	2	"Little Sister and a Vampire"; Transliteration: "Imōto to Banpaia" (Japanese: 妹とバンパイア)	October 8, 2008
The atmosphere grows more ominous as Moka identifies the mysterious girl as her younger half-sister Kokoa Shuzen. As children, Moka's tough inner self had always fought with and won against Kokoa at their home. However, when Moka had moved out of their home with her powers sealed in the rosary, Kokoa had chased her everywhere and vowed to challenge Moka's timid outer self one last time. Kokoa soon bursts into the classroom, and chases Moka around the school, using her mysterious bat, capable of shapeshifting into various weapons, to attack. Tsukune and the others do their best to protect her. Moka later confronts Kokoa outside, yet unable to fight back, and soon admitting defeat. Tsukune speedily intercedes when Kokoa still attacks, and he removes the rosary from Moka's neck. After Moka's inner self lands a stalwart kick on Kokoa, the latter runs to eagerly and lovingly greet the former. Kokoa quietly resolves to have her sister all to herself, as Tsukune carries an exhausted Moka to the infirmary.
16	3	"Mother and a Child and a Vampire"; Transliteration: "Haha to Ko to Banpaia" (Japanese: 母と子とバンパイア)	October 15, 2008
The academy invites the students' parents for a day. It soon becomes a day for both Tsurara Shirayuki (Mizore's mother) and Ageha Kurono (Kurumu's mother) to renew their long-standing rivalry. They initially assume their daughters are going out with Tsukune, and try to push their own to advance her relationship with him. During class, both Mizore and Kurumu sing heartfelt solos for the students. At lunchtime, Tsurara and Ageha are so enraged that they start fighting and trashing the entire school. They both are revealed as alumni at the academy who had a mutual crush on the same guy. Tsukune removes the rosary from Moka's neck, but Moka's inner self slams her foot into Tsukune, throwing him onto the two mothers to calm them down. Afterward, Mizore and Kurumu tell their mothers that they rather have Tsukune naturally fall in love than have him forced into marriage.
17	4	"Body Measurements and a Vampire"; Transliteration: "Shintaisokutei to Banpaia" (Japanese: 身体測定とバンパイア)	October 22, 2008
Bothered by the fact that Tsukune apparently does not pay attention to her due to her size, Yukari goes to the infirmary, where Mako Yakumaru, the school nurse, turns her into an attractive adult. She catches the attention of every male student down the hallway, but Tsukune tries to remain indifferent with her appearance. During the physical examinations, Kurumu somehow still manages to better her in their body measurements. Yukari returns to Mako and asks her to increase her breast size. However, Mako reveals she was only helping Yukari so that she could feed on her negative emotions and growing despair. Mako, altering her fingers into tentacle-like barbs, restrains Yukari by injecting hypnotic fluids into her in order to feed on her again. However, after Tsukune removes the rosary from Moka's neck, Moka's inner self and the other girls swiftly defeat Mako, which all of this is unseen to Yukari. After returning to her child-like state, Yukari decides that she will grow up naturally and asks Tsukune to wait until then. She then kisses him, being the first to do so, much to the chagrin of the others.
18	5	"Curry and a Vampire"; Transliteration: "Karē to Banpaia" (Japanese: カレーとバンパイア)	October 29, 2008
The girls vie to win Tsukune's affection by preparing food for him. They attend a cooking class run by Apsara, a teacher who is very passionate when it comes to Indian curry. Mizore is discouraged at first since curry is hot food and because the other girls have already presented Tsukune with their curries. She remembers back to when Moka's inner self had told her to try living her life before thinking of dying, which gives her the motivation to practice making curry at home. Meanwhile, Apsara transforms the water supply so that it changes into curry, and those who eat her curry find themselves turning a yellowish color. Mizore returns to find the entire student body turned into curry zombies controlled by Apsara in her apsara form. She serves her curry which comes with shaved ice, and it seems to turn Tsukune back to normal. He removes the rosary from Moka's neck, which summons Moka's inner self, who easily defeats Apsara. However, the entire school floods with curry and it takes about a week to clean up. Afterward, Mizore then treats everyone to her innovative shaved ice stew.
19	6	"School Trip and a Vampire"; Transliteration: "Ensoku to Banpaia" (Japanese: 遠足とバンパイア)	November 5, 2008
Moka wants to spend more time with Tsukune during a trip to the human world, but Kurumu, Mizore, and Yukari make it difficult as they try to get close to him themselves. The four arrive at a hotel, where a gang of delinquents from another monster school follows them to and grabs Tsukune as a hostage. The next day, as Kurumu, Mizore, and Yukari fight three of the members, Moka goes and tries to untie Tsukune, only for the leader to notice her and does his special attack on her. A talisman appears and Moka uses it to hit the gang's tengu leader twice before breaking his mask. All four leaders back away to show the "teacher", who turns out to be Kokoa. Moka and the others pay no attention to her as Kokoa tries to attack, but as Tsukune trips and falls, he removes the rosary from Moka's neck, and Moka's inner self kicks Kokoa away. After breakfast, Kurumu, Mizore, and Yukari walk and talk about the shrines and notice that Tsukune and Moka are missing. Tsukune and Moka are walking together but are cornered by the four gang leaders, who bow down and call Moka their "rosary ringleader".
20	7	"Bathroom and a Vampire"; Transliteration: "Basurūmu to Banpaia" (Japanese: バスルームとバンパイア)	November 12, 2008
Tsukune returns to his house to pay his mother Kasumi Aono a visit. However, it suddenly turns to chaos when Moka, Kurumu, Mizore, and Yukari each show up, trying to calm his mother down by saying they are just his classmates. After the girls invade him in the bathroom, Kasumi then faints from the stress, assuming him as a gigolo. His cousin Kyoko Aono later visits in the midst of the chaos and arranges a meeting which only worsens the situation. At night on the rooftop, Kurumu, Mizore, and Yukari fiercely fight to win over Tsukune for themselves, only to wreck parts of the surrounding neighborhood. After Kasumi recovers, Moka apologizes for everything getting out of control. Kasumi tells Moka that Tsukune has defined her as a wonderful friend, which straightens out the misunderstanding. In the playground, Tsukune removes the rosary from Moka's neck, and Moka's inner self punishes Kurumu, Mizore, and Yukari for their behavior. She admonishes Tsukune to choose one of the four girls to be his girlfriend.
21	8	"Youth and a Vampire"; Transliteration: "Seishun to Banpaia" (Japanese: 青春とバンパイア)	November 19, 2008
This is an episode featuring a string of various comical shorts, the main plot involving Ruby Tojo making a dress code requiring the girls to wear long skirts. The shorts consist of Shizuka Nekonome trying out some new clothes; Ginei Morioka trying to figure out why the girls are attracted to Tsukune; Ririko Kagome attempting revenge on Moka for defeating her in the previous year, but is halted by Nekonome in disguise; Kurumu assaulting the other three girls when they make a move on Tsukune; a vignette showing Kokoa making many sides stops throughout Japan during her pursuit for Moka; Tsukune attempting to render his blood unsavory for Moka; and Yukari finding a stray dog in the rain. Unfortunately for Ruby, the long skirts backfire after an intense wind blows, and revealing Ruby's own more risqué underwear to her embarrassment, and everything goes back to normal. Later, Ruby and academy headmaster Tenmei Mikogami discuss the barrier that separates the two worlds.
22	9	"Skiing and a Vampire"; Transliteration: "Sukī to Banpaia" (Japanese: スキーとバンパイア)	November 26, 2008
Tsukune and the others visit a ski resort in the human world run by Tsurara. While the others are skiing, Mizore kidnaps Tsukune by orders from her mother, but she accidentally brings an ice replica of Tsukune instead. Koka, after learning she can get her sister back, finds Tsukune and Moka, trying to remove the rosary from Moka's neck but fails to do so. While yelling at Tsukune, she causes an avalanche, separating Tsukune and herself from Moka. While the other girls are relaxing in the hot springs, Moka and Mizore inform them that Tsukune and Kokoa may be in danger. Although managing to take cover in a cave, Tsukune and Kokoa are closed in due to a snowstorm and Kokoa begins to suffer from hypothermia. A yeti appears and attacks them, but Mizore distracts it long enough for Tsukune and Kokoa to escape. Moka then shortly arrives to save Tsukune and lands on the yeti. As she falls off, Tsukune removes the rosary from Moka's neck. Moka's inner self defeats the yeti, which eventually turns out to be Mizore's costumed father. After apologizing, Tsukune and the others return to the academy.
23	10	"Pretty Boy and a Vampire"; Transliteration: "Bishōnen to Banpaia" (Japanese: 美少年とバンパイア)	December 3, 2008
A new transfer student named Kotaro Ijuin attends the academy, gradually hypnotizing the female student body against their will. Meanwhile, Kokoa searches for her mysterious bat, who has somehow disappeared out of the blue. Kotaro successfully hypnotizes the entire female student body, unbelievably including Gin. Kokoa, eventually deducing that Kotaro is really her mysterious bat in disguise during his stage performance, almost becomes hypnotized as well. Tsukune, who has tried everything to stop Kotaro, jumps up on stage and removes the rosary from Moka's neck. Moka's inner self and Kokoa defeat Kotaro together, undoing the hypnotic spell on the entire female student body. Kokoa thanks Moka's inner self for saving her life, but the latter tells her to thank Moka's outer self for trying to save her even if she was still under the spell.
24	11	"Lilith's Mirror and a Vampire"; Transliteration: "Ririsu no Kagami to Banpaia" (Japanese: リリスの鏡とバンパイア)	December 10, 2008
Kyoko enters the academy carrying a parcel for Tsukune. On her way, she crashes into Kokoa, who is holding a parcel of a similar wrapping. When the two recover, they accidentally exchange parcels. Kokoa ends up with rice balls. However, Kyoko possesses Lilith's Mirror, carried by the fairy-like artifact spirit Lilith. This dangerous object not only reveals the true form of all the students at the academy but also their inner desires. Kyoko realizes that Tsukune is attending a school where everyone is a monster and becomes frightened by everyone's true forms. Moka saves Kyoko and regains her trust, evading the monsters in their way. After finding Lilith, Moka gazes into the mirror, splitting Moka's inner and outer selves as a separate entity, but both bodies lose half their strength. Tsukune arrives with the other girls, who blindfold themselves to defeat Lilith under Kyoko's guidance. Ruby covers the mirror with the wrapping, reverses its effects and returns the student's bodies to their normal selves.
25	12	"Seal and a Vampire"; Transliteration: "Fūin to Banpaia" (Japanese: 封印とバンパイア)	December 17, 2008
After the incident involving Lilith's Mirror, the barrier dividing the two worlds begins to crumble since the rosary stored in the academy that seals the monster energy from leaking out has now been cracked in response. Moka decides to make the ultimate sacrifice by replacing the broken rosary on the seal with her own rosary. As a result, Moka's outer self pays the price of being permanently replaced by Moka's inner self. Throughout the day, the other girls have a hard time getting used to Moka's inner self, while Tsukune cannot help but have Moka's outer self on his mind. Though Mikogami orders her not to tell anyone, Ruby tells Tsukune at night how to recover Moka's rosary, but also warns him of how dangerous this task may be. Tsukune must find the third of the three dark lords who crafted this relic, all of whom founded the academy and built the barrier, that resides in a castle north of the barrier. Kokoa overheard this conversation between Tsukune and Ruby and is planning to intercept him before he reaches his destination.
26	13	"†Rosario and Family and a Vampire"; Transliteration: "Jūjika to Kazoku to Banpaia" (Japanese: 十字架と家族とバンパイア)	December 24, 2008
Tsukune continues on his journey and finally reaches the castle, thanks to Mizore, Yukari, and Kurumu's aid against Tsurara and Ageha. Inside, Kokoa warns him that the third all-powerful dark lord is Issa Shuzen, the father of both Moka and Kokoa. Despite her warnings, Tsukune confronts Issa, getting badly beaten by him in the process, but his determination brings out his latent vampire powers, and manages to snatch the rosary from Issa's hand. Moka's inner self arrives and stops the fight, convincing Issa to let Tsukune have the rosary before having the castle collapse. Moka's inner self has her moment with Tsukune and bites him on the neck before she reattaches the rosary on her neck. Tsukune finally reunites with Moka's outer self, only to be bitten on the neck again. Nekonome and Ruby arrive with the bus to bring everyone back to the academy. After being spanked by her father for being behind several schemes, Kokoa then gains possession of Lilith's mirror once again and uses it. Both Mokas are suddenly present as they as well as Tsukune's other admirers glomp him.
