= Moka Akashiya =

Fictional character in Rosario + Vampire

- Rosario + Vampire character
- Moka Akashiya in promotional artwork for Rosario + Vampire
- First appearance: Manga: "The School Vampire"; Anime: "New Life and a Vampire"
- Created by: Akihisa Ikeda
- Voiced by (Japanese): Nana Mizuki
- Voiced by (English): Alexis Tipton; Colleen Clinkenbeard (inner personality)

In-universe information
- Alias: Mokami Muke Akashiya (萌香美・ムケ・赤夜)
- Species: Vampire
- Gender: Female
- Relatives: Issa Shuzen (father); Akasha Bloodriver (mother); Gyokuro Shuzen (stepmother); Kokoa Shuzen (younger sister); Akua Shuzen (younger sister); Kahlua Shuzen (younger sister)
- Nationality: Japanese

Moka Akashiya (赤夜 萌香, Akashiya Moka) is a fictional character in Akihisa Ikeda's manga and anime series Rosario + Vampire. She serves as one of the love interests to Tsukune Aono, who is the only human enrolled in a school of monsters. She has a rosary that gives her a split personality; her outer persona is kind and sweet, but her inner persona, which manifests when her rosary is removed, is a cold and serious martial artist who mainly uses powerful kicks. In the Japanese version of the anime, her voice actress is Nana Mizuki, who is also responsible for performing the theme songs for both anime seasons. In the English version, Moka's outer personality is voiced by Alexis Tipton, while her inner personality is voiced by Colleen Clinkenbeard.^{[S1 ep 1 closing credits]}

== Conception ==
Ikeda drew inspirations from Kaibutsu-kun and has incorporated some references later into the first serialization of the Rosario+Vampire manga. In an interview at Lucca Comics 2012, Ikeda said he is a big fan of Tim Burton and was inspired by his works, including The Nightmare Before Christmas, and particularly Edward Scissorhands because the monster has a sensitive soul. He had also researched various monsters from encyclopedias and the Internet. He started with his passion for vampires, and the concept of a beautiful girl vampire with a crucifix around her neck. He credits her and the other female characters for the series' popularity.

Moka's name is based on the word "mocha", which is a mixed coffee drink with cocoa. Her family name (Akashiya) may be an anagram for ayakashi, which is a Japanese term for demon, spirit, or monster. Her half-sisters have similar drink-based names.

== Character outline ==
=== Background and personality ===
Moka is described as having two distinct personalities. The outer one manifests when she is wearing her rosary, while her inner one comes out when the rosary is removed.^{[S1 v1]} Some exceptions are made when she employs various magic canceling objects such as Lilith's mirror which reveals a monster's true nature,^{[S1 v10]} and the Belmont Whip, which when wrapped around part of her body, cancels out the rosary's power.^{[S2 v4]}

=== Outer Moka ===
Cheerful and positive, "Outer" (表, Omote) Moka is introduced in the series as a teenage vampire girl with long pink hair. At her debut in Yokai Academy's high school, she is immediately revered for her natural good looks and her academic ability, having placed in the teens (out of several hundred students) on one of their exams.^{[S1 v1]} Although she is good natured and kind, she possesses some naivety that draws her into problematic situations. Prior to the series, she is distrustful of humans, having spent much of her life in the human world, including middle school where she is shunned by her fellow students.^{[S1 v1]} After meeting Tsukune Aono, however, she begins to trust them.

In the manga's second serialization, Tsukune and the gang learn that Moka's appearance is that of her mother Akasha Bloodriver.^{[S2 v7]} When Tsukune and his friends look into Moka's past, they discover that the outer Moka is a pseudo-personality that Akasha creates using the rosario, with the purpose of preserving the blood seal on Alucard, and protecting Moka's inner personality while the latter is asleep.^{[s2 ch 34]} All of her memories pertaining to Alucard are wiped.^{[S2 ch 35]} In the final chapter, Akasha reveals that Outer Moka is a clone of herself but with her memories wiped so she can protect her daughter.^{[S2 ch 66.6]} After Akasha disappears, Moka's father later reveals that her personality is still with Moka as long as they have memories of her.^{[S2 epilogue]}

=== Inner Moka ===
Inner Moka, Moka's true vampiric form

When the rosary around Moka's neck is removed, her inner vampiric personality emerges as Inner Moka (裏萌香, Ura-Moka) a deeply aristocratic, aggressive and arrogant vampire woman. Her catchphrase at the end of a fight is "Learn your place" (身の程を知れ, Minohodo o shire; also "Know your place").

Moka's inner personality is shown to have a more feminine side when she spent a day with Tsukune, similar to the outer half.^{[S2 ch 16]} It is later revealed that Inner Moka is actually Moka's true personality. As a newborn, she is injected with blood from Akasha in order to save her life. The "First Ancestor" blood that she acquires enables her to have tremendous strength and regeneration, but can only be acquired by transfusion and not by heredity. When Akasha is attacked and seemingly killed by her sister Akua, Moka snaps where her First Ancestor blood is awaken, which inadvertently awakens the Vampire Lord Alucard as their blood is synchronized with him. To prevent her daughter from being eaten by Alucard so that she can have a normal life, Akasha uses a rosary to seal Moka's First Ancestor blood, and creates a pseudo-personality, "Outer" Moka, so that her inner personality can sleep. Akasha designs for Moka's inner personality to occasionally awaken when her rosario is removed by a person who truly cares about her.^{[S2 v8]}

=== Moka's Rosario ===
Only Tsukune can remove the rosario safely, but Moka is also able, albeit with potentially fatal side-effects. Moka's rosary was the only thing that her mother left behind after she disappeared. It was originally believed that Moka's rosary sealed her true vampiric powers. However, when Moka and her friends went to Hong Kong to see Tohofuhai, the Second Dark Lord, about fixing the rosary, Tohofuhai discovered that the rosary does not actually seal Moka's powers. Much to his surprise, it seals away Moka's memories. The whole point of sealing Inner Moka is to seal away her First Ancestor Blood, which is linked to Alucard's powers, and can only be removed by a person who truly cares for her, in other words, Tsukune.^{[S2 ch 34]} In the anime adaptation, Moka manages to bypass her rosary seal after Ruby mortally wounds Tsukune during the Witch's Knoll arc, the emotional trauma causing her Inner personality to emerge without having Tsukune remove the seal.^{[S1 ep 10]} Also, if willed on by Moka, it can hold back the awakening of Alucard. She was also able to bypass the seal on her Rosario when witnessing what she thought to be Kurumu and Mizore slain by Aqua's Dimension Sword technique. That was what caused the seal to break, and gave Gyokuro the ability to forcefully remove her cross, when normally only Tsukune could.

== Appearances ==
=== Manga ===
Ikeda draws Moka with long, pink hair and green eyes. Her inner personality, when manifested, is drawn with silver hair and red eyes. At the beginning of the series, Moka's inner personality mocks Tsukune for his personality, but as the series progresses, she shows an interest in Tsukune by letting him hold her hand in the manga, although this was done so he could learn how to sense when monsters such as her jealous classmates and friends attack.^{[S2 ch 16]} This is shown more in the anime when Moka's inner personality is left outside after her rosario is used to hold the barrier; she tries to act the same as her outer personality.^{[S2 ep 12]} Inner Moka has no experience in cooking: her attempts to cook a pumpkin pie prove disastrous, although when Tsukune tastes it he tells her he likes it, which makes her very happy.^{[S2 ch 26]} At the end of chapter 26 of the second serialization, the seal was broken sufficiently enough that Inner Moka has taken over the body and Outer Moka was forced into being the Inner personality, however the two can still converse via the rosario almost normally with each other.^{[S2 ch 26]} The seal was fixed in later chapters prior to Moka's captivity by Akua as an emergency measure.

=== Anime ===
In each of the episodes in the anime series, when Moka's rosario is removed, there is a transformation sequence where she becomes a "super-vampire". She still has silver hair and red eyes with slit pupils, but undergoes physical changes to her body such as slightly larger hips and bust size.^{[S1 ep 1]} Her transformation is likened to those of magical girls.^{[S1 ep 1]} Her voice is deeper and more serious, and in the English version, she is voiced by a different voice actor.^{[S1 ep 1]} Following her fights as Inner Moka, the bat character announces the duration of Moka's fight. Her appearance resembles that of her father, Issa Shuzen.

== Character songs ==
Moka's first character single, sung by Nana Mizuki and containing songs Akai jōnetsu (赤い情熱, Red passion) and a cover of Akai suītopī (赤いスイートピー, Red Sweet-Pea) by Seiko Matsuda, debuted at number 42 on the Oricon weekly chart. and remained on the chart for four weeks. Her character single for the second anime series, containing songs Anata ni kapu~tsu chū! (あなたにカプッchu！, The Kapu Chu to you!) and Dezaia - jōnetsu (DESIRE －情熱－, Desire -passion-) reached number 40, and remained for a total of three weeks.

== Reception ==
In reviewing the first anime series, Stig Høgset of THEM Anime Reviews criticized Outer Moka to be ditzy and a "pink-haired dolt", with no attention to the usual vampire tropes such as exposure to sunlight, garlic and water, the last of which was explained that Moka is only vulnerable to pure water. However, he found her alternate personality to be "pretty damn badass" and "a great addition to the show", opining that he wished her backstory was explained better. Moka was elected by UGO Networks as the fortieth "sexiest vampire" of all media, with the staff commenting on her relationship with Tsukune. Lynzee Loveridge of Anime News Network listed Moka among her list of 7 Vampires That Don't Suck.
