= Rosario + Vampire =

Japanese manga series

- First tankōbon volume cover, featuring Moka Akashiya

ロザリオとバンパイア (Rozario to Banpaia)
- Genre: Harem; Romantic comedy; Supernatural
- Manga
- Written by: Akihisa Ikeda
- Published by: Shueisha
- English publisher: AUS: Madman Entertainment; NA/UK: Viz Media
- Imprint: Jump Comics
- Magazine: Monthly Shōnen Jump; (April 6, 2004 – June 6, 2007); Weekly Shōnen Jump; (September 22, 2007; extra)
- Original run: April 6, 2004 – September 22, 2007
- Volumes: 10
- Manga

Rosario + Vampire: Season II
- Written by: Akihisa Ikeda
- Published by: Shueisha
- English publisher: AUS: Madman Entertainment; NA/UK: Viz Media
- Imprint: Jump Comics SQ.
- Magazine: Jump Square; Jump SQ.19 (epilogue)
- Original run: November 4, 2007 – April 19, 2014
- Volumes: 14
- Anime television series
- Directed by: Takayuki Inagaki
- Written by: Hiroshi Yamaguchi
- Music by: Kohei Tanaka; Shirō Hamaguchi
- Studio: Gonzo
- Licensed by: Crunchyroll: UK: MVM Films
- Original network: Tokyo MX, CTC, tvk, TVS, TVO, TVA, RAB, Kids Station
- Original run: January 3, 2008 – March 27, 2008
- Episodes: 13
- Novel
- Written by: Fumihiko Shimo
- Published by: Shueisha
- Imprint: Jump J-Books
- Published: April 4, 2008
- Anime television series

Rosario + Vampire Capu2
- Directed by: Takayuki Inagaki
- Written by: Hiroshi Yamaguchi
- Music by: Kohei Tanaka; Shirō Hamaguchi
- Studio: Gonzo
- Licensed by: Crunchyroll: UK: MVM Films
- Original network: TVO, Tokyo MX, Mie TV, CTC, tvk, TVS, Gifu Broadcasting System, Inc., RAB, Kids Station
- Original run: October 2, 2008 – December 24, 2008
- Episodes: 13
- Video game

Rosario + Vampire: Tanabata's Miss Yokai Academy
- Developer: Dimps Corporation
- Publisher: Capcom
- Genre: Visual novel
- Platform: Nintendo DS
- Released: JP: March 20, 2008
- Video game

Rosario + Vampire Capu2: The Rhapsody of Love and Dreams
- Developer: Compile Heart
- Genre: Visual novel
- Platform: PlayStation 2
- Released: JP: July 23, 2009
- icon

Rosario + Vampire (Japanese: ロザリオとバンパイア, Hepburn: Rozario to Banpaia) is a Japanese manga series written and illustrated by Akihisa Ikeda. The story revolves around Tsukune Aono, a boy who inadvertently enrolls in a boarding school for monsters. He quickly befriends Moka Akashiya, a vampire who soon develops an obsession with his blood, and later meets other monster girls who soon take a romantic liking to him. The manga was serialized in Shueisha's shōnen manga magazine Monthly Shonen Jump from April 2004 to June 2007, when the magazine ceased its publication. An extra chapter was published in Weekly Shōnen Jump in September 2007. The chapters were collected in ten tankōbon volumes.

A sequel, titled Rosario + Vampire: Season II, was serialized in Jump Square from November 2007 to February 2014. An epilogue chapter was published in Jump SQ.19 in April 2014. The chapters were collected in 14 tankōbon volumes. Both manga series were licensed in North America and in the United Kingdom by Viz Media, and in Australia and New Zealand by Madman Entertainment. The series also spanned three CD dramas, two visual novels, a novel adaptation, and two internet radio shows.

A 13-episode anime adaptation aired between January and March 2008. A second season of the series, Rosario + Vampire Capu2, (Note: The subtitle Capu2 comes from Kapu chuu (カプッchu), the sound Moka makes when she drinks Tsukune's blood. Ikeda, who coined the phrase, says that "kapu" is the onomatopoeia of "bite", and "chuu" is a "kiss".) aired between October and December 2008. The anime was licensed in North America by Funimation (later consolidated into Crunchyroll), who released both seasons in December 2011. The anime is also licensed in Australia and New Zealand by Madman Entertainment, who released both seasons in 2012.

== Plot ==
Yōkai Academy, the main setting of Rosario + Vampire

Tsukune Aono is an average teenager who is unable to get into any local high schools due to his poor grades. As a last-ditch effort to secure his education, his parents enroll him in a private school called Yokai Academy, which he discovers is a boarding school for monsters. The school teaches monsters how to coexist with humans, including disguising them as them, but any real humans found on campus are to be killed. Although he fears for his life, Tsukune befriends a beautiful vampire girl named Moka Akashiya, who enjoys his company and especially the taste of his blood. During a fight with a school bully, Tsukune accidentally removes the rosario around Moka's neck and discovers that she transforms into a powerful vampire with a completely different personality.

Because of Moka, Tsukune decides to stay at Yokai. He befriends formerly antagonistic students, including succubus Kurumu Kurono and child prodigy witch Yukari Sendo. They join the school's Newspaper Club and wind up fighting a variety of students and teachers, who use their monstrous powers to bully or to control one or more of the members for their own selfish or destructive ends. On a club trip to the human world, they meet a witch, Ruby Tojo, who defends a field of sunflowers from being torn down by developers. They meet Mizore Shirayuki, a snow fairy student who becomes Tsukune's "stalker". A group of "Monstrels" harass the club. Ruby, having recovered from injuries, joins the school's staff as the Headmaster's assistant. An evil group called the Anti-Schoolers threaten to break down the barrier between the human and monster worlds. When Tsukune's cousin manages to sneak onto the school grounds, the club has a hard time keeping the monster school a secret. When the school is temporarily closed because of damage, Tsukune returns home to the human world only to have Moka, Kurumu, Yukari, and Mizore follow him and hide in his room.

In Rosario+Vampire: Season II, Moka's younger half-sister Koko Shuzen enrolls. She, Ruby, and Mizore join the Newspaper Club. On an excursion to Mizore's homeland, they learn of a dangerous organization called Fairy Tale, which seeks to destroy the human world. The Newspaper Club visits the human world where they meet San Otonashi, a former club member, and run into trouble with adversaries from Fairy Tale's 7th Branch office. Chinese transfer student Fangfang Huang tries to recruit Tsukune to join his mafia family. When Moka spends a school day as her inner personality, she is unable to return to the seal, so the Newspaper Club heads to China to get her Rosario fixed.

In Hong Kong, Tsukune and the gang learn the truth about Moka's identity: she was infused with First Ancestor blood by her mother Akasha Bloodriver, who sacrificed herself to protect them from Alucard, the original First Ancestor vampire. Moka's eldest half-sister Aqua infiltrates the Huang manor and captures Moka to bring to Fairy Tale, which suspects that Moka is the key to reviving Alucard. While his friends train their powers, Tsukune has his body altered by Tohofuhai to handle the upcoming challenges.

Tsukune and the gang infiltrate the Hanging Garden: a sky fortress that serves as Fairy Tale's headquarters. They face opposition from their leader and matriarch of the Shuzen family Gyokuro Shuzen, who sends the leaders of the Fairy Tale Branches after them for a series of fights. The group eventually reaches Moka, but must face her half-sisters Aqua and Kalua. Gyokuro snatches Moka's rosario in order to control Alucard. A character called the Masked King reveals himself to be a clone of Alucard's original vampire form. He reveals that he has manipulated both Fairy Tale and its opposition to determine whether the rosario could control him, and then merges with his monster self, who goes on a rampage in Tokyo.

Moka is mortally wounded, but Tsukune revives her by removing all his holy locks and transforming himself into a First Ancestor vampire. They beat down Alucard, but he revives and reveals that he has hatched eggs in Japan's major cities. Tsukune's friends and allies, along with the two other Dark Lords, band together to fight Alucard and his clones. Tsukune puts Moka's rosario on Alucard, which awakens Akasha inside his monster body. Akasha tells Alucard to give up the fight, and they cast a self-disintegration spell. Now that the existence of monsters is known in the human world, coexistence is now even harder to achieve; however, Tsukune is confident that he and his friends can do it.

== Production ==
Ikeda drew inspiration from the monster manga series Kaibutsu-kun and has incorporated some references later into the first serialization of the Rosario+Vampire manga. In an interview at Lucca Comics 2012, Ikeda said he is a big fan of Tim Burton and was inspired by his works, including The Nightmare Before Christmas, and particularly Edward Scissorhands because the monster has a sensitive soul. His first character design was Moka, a beautiful girl vampire with a crucifix around her neck; he then created the school of monsters and Tsukune afterwards. He credits the beautiful girls for the series' popularity and added the fighting elements. After the series ended in Monthly Shōnen Jump but was going to be featured in Jump Square, he retitled the second series to give it a sense of renewal.

== Media ==
=== Manga ===
Written and illustrated by Akihisa Ikeda, Rosario + Vampire was first published with a one-shot in Shueisha's shōnen manga magazine Monthly Shōnen Jump in its October 2003 issue; it debuted as a serialized manga in the same magazine on April 6, 2004. The magazine ceased its publication on June 6, 2007. An extra chapter was published in Weekly Shōnen Jump on September 22, 2007. Shueisha collected its 40 individual chapters in ten tankōbon volumes, released from October 4, 2004, to October 4, 2007.

A sequel, titled Rosario + Vampire: Season II (ロザリオとバンパイア season II, Rozario to Banpaia Shīzun Tsū), was serialized in Jump Square, the successor to Monthly Shōnen Jump, from November 2, 2007, to February 4, 2014. An epilogue chapter was published in Jump SQ.19 on April 19, 2014. Shueisha collected its 66 individual chapters in 14 tankōbon volumes, released from June 4, 2008, to May 2, 2014.

Both manga series were licensed in North America and in the United Kingdom by Viz Media under its Shonen Jump Advanced imprint, and in Australia and New Zealand by Madman Entertainment. Viz Media released the first series between June 8, 2008, and November 3, 2009, and the second between April 6, 2010, and May 5, 2015.

=== Anime ===
A 13-episode anime adaptation produced by Gonzo and directed by Takayuki Inagaki aired from January 3 to March 27, 2008, on Tokyo MX, Chiba TV, and TV Kanagawa, with later runs on TV Saitama, TV Osaka, TV Aichi, Aomori Broadcasting Corporation, and Kids Station. Six DVD compilation volumes were released between April 25 and September 26, 2008, and a DVD/Blu-ray box set was released on January 29, 2010. The anime quickly became notorious for its extensive use of fanservice in the form of panty shots, leading the series to be censored on certain channels during its TV broadcast.

A second 13-episode season, Rosario + Vampire Capu2 (ロザリオとバンパイア CAPU2, Rozario to Banpaia Kapucchū), aired on TV Osaka between October 2 and December 24, 2008, with subsequent runs on Tokyo MX, Mie TV, Chiba TV, TV Kanagawa, TV Saitama, Gifu Broadcasting System, Inc., Aomori Broadcasting Corporation, and Kids Station. Six DVD volumes were released between December 21, 2008, and May 22, 2009, and a DVD/Blu-ray box set was released on March 19, 2010.

For the first season, the opening theme is "Cosmic Love" and the ending theme is called "Dancing in the Velvet Moon". For the second season, the opening theme is "Discotheque" and the ending theme is "Trinity Cross"; all songs in the series were performed by Nana Mizuki, the voice actress for Moka Akashiya in the series.

The anime was licensed in North America by Funimation, and released both seasons on December 20, 2011. Funimation initially encountered production issues from the Japanese licensors, causing a series of delays with their release date. Originally intended for release on March 19, 2011, the release date was pushed back to May 17, 2011, and later to July 19, 2011. Following Sony's acquisition of Crunchyroll, the series was moved to Crunchyroll. The anime is also licensed in Australia and New Zealand by Madman Entertainment, who already holds licensing rights to the manga, and released both seasons in 2012. MVM Entertainment holds the anime license in the United Kingdom and released the first season of the series on September 10, 2012.

=== Music ===
A series of character singles from the first season of the anime was released by King Records. The first set of singles, featuring Moka Akashiya (Nana Mizuki), Kurumu Kurono (Misato Fukuen) and Yukari Sendo (Kimiko Koyama), was released on February 14, 2008. The second set of singles, featuring Mizore Shirayuki (Rie Kugimiya) and Ruby Tojo (Saeko Chiba), was released on March 26, 2008, along with a compilation album called The Capucchu (ザ・かぷっちゅ, Za Kapucchu). An original soundtrack was released on December 25, 2008.

A set of character singles from the second season was also released by King Records. The first set of singles for Moka Akashiya, Kokoa Shuzen (Chiwa Saito), Kurumu Kurono, and Yukari Sendo was released on October 29, 2008, while the second set of singles featuring Mizore Shirayuki and Ruby Tojo was released on November 26, 2008, along with another The Capucchu compilation album. A "Best Of" album, titled Rosario + Vampire: Idol Cover BEST (ロザリオとバンパイア アイドルカバーBEST, Rozario to Banpaia: Aidoru Kabā Besuto), was released on February 18, 2009.

=== Other media ===
A drama CD adaptation was released by Shueisha on August 31, 2006. A second drama CD was released by Shueisha on December 14, 2007, and a third drama CD based on the anime adaptation was released by Marine Entertainment on July 25, 2008. Most of the voice actors from the CDs were carried on to the anime series.

An internet radio show promoting the anime, titled Radio! Rosario + Vampire (ラジオ!ロザリオとバンパイア, Rajio! Rozario to Banpaia), aired on Onsen between December 27, 2007, and March 27, 2008. Another radio show promoting the second anime called Radio! Rosario + Vampire Capu2 (ラジオ!ロザリオとバンパイア CAPU2, Rajio! Rozario to Banpaia Kapucchū) also aired on Onsen between October 23, 2008, and April 23, 2009. The shows are hosted by Misato Fukuen and Kimiko Koyama, the voices of Kurumu Kurono and Yukari Sendo, respectively. A CD based on the first radio show was released by Sony Music Entertainment on August 6, 2008, and another CD based on the second radio show was released on June 24, 2009.

A novelization of Rosario + Vampire written by Fumihiko Shimo was released by Shueisha on April 4, 2008, under their Jump J-Books imprint.

A visual novel, titled Rosario + Vampire: Tanabata's Miss Yokai Academy (ロザリオとバンパイア 七夕のミス陽海学園, Rozario to Banpaia: Tanabata no Misu Yōkai Gakuen), was developed by Capcom and was released on March 20, 2008, for the Nintendo DS. Another visual novel, titled Rosario + Vampire Capu2: The Rhapsody of Love and Dreams (ロザリオとバンパイア CAPU2 恋と夢の狂想曲(ラプソディア), Rozario to Banpaia CAPU2: Koi to Yume no Rapusodia), was developed by Compile Heart and was released for the PlayStation 2 on July 23, 2009. The player assumes the role of Tsukune Aono in both games, and both games feature new characters.

== Reception ==
=== Manga ===
New York Times Manga Best-Seller List
| Series | Volume No. | Peak rank | Notes | Refs |
|---|---|---|---|---|
| 1 | 6 | 8 | 1 week | |
| 1 | 7 | 2 | 4 weeks | |
| 1 | 8 | 2 | 7 weeks | |
| 1 | 9 | 2 | 2 weeks | |
| 1 | 10 | 3 | 5 weeks | |
| 2 | 1 | 1 | 7 weeks | |
| 2 | 2 | 1 | 5 weeks | |
| 2 | 3 | 2 | 7 weeks | |
| 2 | 4 | 1 | 8 weeks | |
| 2 | 5 | 2 | 3 weeks | |
| 2 | 6 | 1 | 4 weeks | |
| 2 | 7 | 4 | 5 weeks | |
| 2 | 8 | 1 | 5 weeks | |
| 2 | 9 | 3 | 3 weeks | |
| 2 | 10 | 3 | 3 weeks | |
| 2 | 11 | 1 | 4 weeks | |
| 2 | 12 | 2 | 2 weeks | |
| 2 | 13 | 1 | 3 weeks | |
| 2 | 14 | 2 | 4 weeks | |

Oricon Japanese comic rankings
| Series | Volume No. | Peak rank | Notes | Refs |
|---|---|---|---|---|
| 2 | 3 | 10 | 1 week | |
| 2 | 4 | 11 | 1 week | |
| 2 | 5 | 17 | 1 week | |
| 2 | 6 | 10 | 1 week | |
| 2 | 7 | 13 | 1 week | |
| 2 | 8 | 17 | 1 week | |
| 2 | 10 | 21 | 2 weeks | |
| 2 | 12 | 11 | 1 week | |
| 2 | 14 | 23 | 1 week | |

Volumes of the series commonly rank in listings of top selling manga in Japan.

In North America, the second volume of Rosario + Vampire was featured on BookScan's Top 20 Graphic Novels, ranking sixth in August 2008 and sixteenth in September 2008, with the fifth volume ranking at #7 in February 2009. Season II Volume 8 reached number 5 on BookScan and was the top manga in April 2012 Season II Volume 11 ranked number 10, and Season II Volume 12 reached number 3.

Carlo Santos of Anime News Network gave the first volume of Season II a C rating and the second volume a B− rating. When he gave volume 1 a C, he stated that "you could do a lot worse". He felt that Season II has all the things that made the series good, but the attempt to reboot the series for the new semester caused it to lack intense feeling, reintroducing all the characters and going against weak enemies once again. For the second volume, Santos was more pleased with the introduction of a major villain and the fanservice artwork in the lighter story, but lamented the lack of any visually threatening monster.

Matthew Warner of Mania.com gave volumes 1 through 3 of Season II ratings between B+ and A−. In his review for volume 1, he felt the first part was a bit weak with "predictable and bland stories," but remarked positively on the volume's cover art and artwork in general, especially the character artwork. For the second volume, he said it was better focusing on two stories and while noting the second story with Koko was weaker, it still delivers "quite a few solid laughs" and helps develop her character. In his review for volume 3, he stated while it starts out slow, he really enjoyed the story with Mizore, specifically the character development and seeing the characters put aside their disagreements for a common goal: to save Mizore.

Leroy Douresseaux of Comic Book Bin gave volumes of Season II an A− rating. He opined the emphases on sexual innuendo, comparing it to Strawberry 100%, and that the series is like The Addams Family mixed with X-Men: "cool, creepy folks at a secret school where they can live and learn in a place free of the prejudice against them." In volume 11, he changed his overall view and deemed it solidly a battle manga.

YALSA included Rosario + Vampire, Vol.1 in its list of the 2013 Popular Paperbacks for Young Adults under the subcategory Boarding Schools to Summer Camps: Leaving home to find yourself.
