= Akihisa Ikeda =

Japanese manga artist (born 1976)

- 池田晃久
- Born: October 25, 1976 (age 49); Nichinan, Miyazaki, Japan
- Occupation: Manga artist
- Years active: 2002-present
- Known for: Rosario + Vampire

Akihisa Ikeda (池田晃久, Ikeda Akihisa; born October 25, 1976) is a Japanese manga artist known for the manga Rosario + Vampire.

== Biography ==
Ikeda was born in Miyazaki in 1976. His first work, Kiruto, debuted in 2002 in Monthly Shōnen Jump. It is described as a "four-volume magical warrior fantasy series". Rosario + Vampire debuted in Monthly Shōnen Jump in March 2004 and continued in Jump Square (Jump SQ) as Rosario+Vampire: Season II until its conclusion in 2014. Rosario has been adapted into a drama CD and anime series, as well as some video games. He has mentioned having the same editor since he was 16 until the beginning of volume 7 of Rosario. In the March 2014 issue, Ikeda concluded the Rosario series.

In July 2020, Ikeda serialized a new manga series "Ghost Reaper Girl" in Shonen Jump+ under the name of Akissa Saike (紗池晃久, Saike Akihisa).

== Influences ==
Ikeda has mentioned that he has been a huge fan of vampires and monsters since he was a child. He also enjoys reading detective novels from "Holmes, Lupin, Kindaichi, Nijyumenso and the like". In an interview at Lucca Comics 2012, Ikeda says he is a big fan of Tim Burton and was inspired by his works, including The Nightmare Before Christmas, and particularly Edward Scissorhands because the monster has a sensitive soul. He had researched various monsters from the encyclopedias and the Internet. His first character design for Rosario was Moka Akashiya, a beautiful girl vampire with a crucifix around her neck; he then created the school of monsters and Tsukune afterward. He credits the beautiful girls for the series' popularity but added the fighting elements. After the first series ended with the retirement of the Monthly Shōnen Jump magazine, and with the serialization in a second magazine, Jump Square, he retitled the second series to give it a sense of renewal.

== Notable works ==
- Kiruto (2002)
- Rosario + Vampire (2004–07)
- Rosario + Vampire: Season II (2008–14)
- Ghost Reaper Girl (2020)
