= List of Rosario + Vampire characters =

The main cast of Rosario + Vampire. Front: Tsukune Aono; Middle row (l-r): Mizore Shirayuki, Yukari Sendou, Moka Akashiya (Outer (pink hair) and Inner (silver hair)), Kurumu Kurono; Back row (l-r): Ginei Morioka, Koko Shuzen, Ruby Tojo.

The Japanese manga series Rosario + Vampire features an extensive cast of characters by Akihisa Ikeda. The main character of the series is Tsukune Aono, a teenage boy who, after not getting accepted to any local high schools, enrolls in Yokai Academy, a boarding school for monsters. He meets Moka Akashiya, a vampire who soon takes a liking to the sweet taste of his blood, and throughout the series, befriends and attracts a variety of monster girls including: Kurumu Kurono, a succubus; Yukari Sendou and Ruby Tojo, who are witches; and Mizore Shirayuki, a snow fairy. While protecting Tsukune's identity as a human, they join the school's Newspaper Club; they wind up fighting a variety of monster gangs as well as some teachers. In the second manga serialization, the Newspaper Club faces more monster characters and a larger organization known as Fairy Tale, whose members include Moka's own family.

In developing the characters for the series, Ikeda cited influences from Tim Burton's works, and research on various monsters from encyclopedias and the Internet. The characters have been commented on by reviewers, who had mixed feelings about Ikeda's artwork, but criticized the character development and its missed potential. The anime adaptation received negative criticism for its fanservice, and mixed reviews for other aspects such as voice acting. Characters have also featured in various merchandise, character songs and polls.

== Conception and development ==
Ikeda drew inspirations from Kaibutsu-kun and has incorporated some references later into the first serialization of the Rosario + Vampire manga. In an interview at Lucca Comics 2012, Ikeda said he is a big fan of Tim Burton and was inspired by his works, including The Nightmare Before Christmas, and particularly Edward Scissorhands because the monster has a sensitive soul. He had also researched various monsters from encyclopedias and the Internet. He started with his passion for vampires, and the concept of a beautiful girl vampire with a crucifix around her neck and then created the school of monsters, Tsukune, and others afterwards. He credits the beautiful girls for the series' popularity and added the fighting elements.

Ikeda has mentioned that he has great respect for real-life teachers, so he designed the monster ones to contrast that and be more comical. He also introduced Fangfang Huang to increase the number of male characters and to attract more female readers. He created a male counterpart that looks feminine to increase the comic element. During the development of Season II, he also acknowledged that the series would have a finite ending. He introduced San Otonashi to reflect the feelings and struggles of young people as they ponder their futures and transitioning into the working world.^{[S2 v5 author's notes]} In Season II, Volume 8, he noted that he had to postpone the publishing date because he took so much time in drawing it.^{[S2 v8 author's notes]} In Season II, Volume 11, he mentions his favorite manga characters from other series are: Dio (JoJo's Bizarre Adventure), Toguro (Yu Yu Hakusho), Hakumen (Ushio To Tora), and Master Kogan (Shigurui) - the villains who "have an inimitable style and play by their own rules. They're powerful and dark, but there's something melancholy about them too as well...and that's what draws me to them." He hopes his villains (Aqua, Gyokuro, Miyabi, Kiria, and others) would draw readers.^{[S2 v11 author's notes]}

== Protagonists ==
The main protagonists are club members of the school's newspaper, the Yokai Times (anime: Yokai Gazette). The club president is Ginei Morioka and the staff adviser is Shizuka Nekonome.^{[S1 v1]}

=== Tsukune Aono ===
Tsukune Aono (青野 月音, Aono Tsukune) is an average teenager who, unable to get into the local high schools thanks to his poor grades, enrolls at Yokai Academy. He discovers it is a school for monsters, and must hide his human identity under punishment of death. However, because he befriends Moka Akashiya, an attractive vampire, he decides to stay.^{[S1 v1]} Over the course of the series, he makes new friends and protects them without a second thought. Most of his friends are girls who in turn compete for his affection. When infused with Moka's blood, he acquires extraordinary strength that allows him to defeat other monsters.^{[S1 v3]} The transfusions, however, take a toll on his human body and transform him into a ghoul, after which he is given a spirit lock to retain his humanity.^{[S1 v6]} In Season II, he trains^{[S2 v5]} and undergoes body alterations to become stronger^{[S2 v9]} and to control his vampiric power. He eventually is able to transform into a powerful vampire like Moka.^{[S2 v14]} In the original Japanese series and drama CD, Tsukune is voiced by Daisuke Kishio. In the English dub, he is voiced by Todd Haberkorn.

=== Moka Akashiya ===
Moka Akashiya (赤夜 萌香, Akashiya Moka) is the vampiress title character. She is highly regarded by her schoolmates for her beauty and academic ability.^{[S1 v1]} She enjoys biting and drinking blood from Tsukune's neck. (Note: In the anime's Japanese dub, when Moka bites Tsukune's neck, she makes the sound Kapu chuu (カプッchu, subtitled "Chomp, Slurp!") (In the English dub, she sighs happily). Ikeda says "kapu" is the onomatopoeia of "bite", and "chuu" is a "kiss". He also says it has nothing to do with cappuccino or the drink theme that he gives Moka's family members.) When her rosario is removed from her necklace, she undergoes a personality change (along with a physical transformation sequence in the anime) to a ruthless, arrogant and skilled martial artist who easily beats opponents with powerful kicks.^{[S1 ch 1]} Her catchphrase when exhibiting her inner personality is: "Know your place" (身の程を知れ, Minohodo o shire; also "Learn your place" (Note: Both "Learn your place"^{[S1 v1]}^{[S2 v1]}^{[S2 ep 2]} and "Know your place"^{[S1 ch 39,40]}^{[S2 v2]}^{[ S1 ep 1]} have been used in the manga and anime translations for Moka's catchphrase.)). In the original Japanese series and drama CD, Moka is voiced by Nana Mizuki. In the English dub, Moka is voiced by two people: Alexis Tipton voices Moka's outer personality, while Colleen Clinkenbeard provides her inner one.^{[S1 ep 1 credits]}

=== Kurumu Kurono ===
Kurumu Kurono (黒乃 胡夢, Kurono Kurumu) is a busty succubus student who originally plans to enslave all the boys at school with her kiss. Overshadowed by Moka's popularity, she targets Moka's object of affection, Tsukune, by using her charm ability but fails. After Moka defeats her, she falls in love with Tsukune because he shows her kindness, while stopping Moka from causing further harm. She then pursues him exclusively as her Mate of Fate (運命の人, Unmei no hito).^{[S1 ch 2]} Over the course of the series, she learns to value her friendship with Moka and the other girls when they help her out in situations. Because of this, she restrains herself from using her powers to her advantage on Tsukune, and tries to win him over fairly.^{[S1 v2]}^{[S1 v4]}^{[S2 ch 17]} In her succubus form, Kurumu has long fingernails that can cleanly slice through tree trunks, pointed ears and tail, and bat wings that enable her to fly and to carry people.^{[S1 v1]} She can cast high-level illusion spells,^{[S1 v2]} as well as enter people's dreams.^{[S2 ch 31]} Over the summer break, she and Mizore train in close-quarters combat,^{[S2 ch 4, vol 1 omake]} and develop joint attacks called Black and White Duets.^{[S2 ch 6]}^{[S2 ch 13]} In a later storyline, she reveals that succubi gain their power by loving others, and a succubus who cannot love will eventually die.^{[S2 ch 40,41]} In the Japanese anime series and drama CD, Kurumu is voiced by Misato Fukuen. In the English dub, she is voiced by Brina Palencia.

=== Yukari Sendou ===
Yukari Sendou (仙童 紫, Sendō Yukari; Anime: Yukari Sendo) is introduced as an 11-year-old witch genius, complete with witch hat and heart-shaped magic wand, with a "little sister" personality.^{[S1 v3 char profiles]} She scores at the top of her class, but is ridiculed by her classmates for being "borderline", that is, between monster and human. She idolizes Moka, and initially hates Tsukune for garnering Moka's attention. However, after both Tsukune and Moka save her, she falls for Tsukune and dreams of a three-way relationship with them.^{[S1 v2]}^{[S2 v1]} Although she clashes with Kurumu and the other girls, she teams up with them on various adventures.^{[S1 v4]} Yukari's abilities include manipulating flying tarot cards to slice through monster plants;^{[S1 v4]} and summoning a metal washtub to drop on a person's head or to clobber the person.^{[S1 v2]}^{[S1 v10]} In the second manga serialization, she develops magic items,^{[S2 v1]}^{[S2 v2]} summons creatures,^{[S2 ch 49]} and becomes close with Fangfang Huang.^{[S2 v14 extras]} In the Japanese anime and drama CD, she is voiced by Kimiko Koyama. In the English dub, she is voiced by Monica Rial.

=== Mizore Shirayuki ===
Mizore Shirayuki (白雪 みぞれ, Shirayuki Mizore) is a snow fairy^{[S1 v5]}^{[S1 v7 char profiles]} who joins Tsukune's class in the second term. She is typically seen with a lollipop in her mouth, which is actually a special coolant.^{[S1 v10 omake]} In her first school term, she confesses her love to gym teacher Okuto Kotsubo, but when he takes advantage of her, she freezes him and gets suspended for the term. She obsesses over Tsukune because of his news articles, and stalks him regularly,^{[S1 v5]} eventually joining the Newspaper Club in her second year.^{[S2 ch 7]} Besides freezing people outright, Mizore can shape claws of ice from her hands, throw ice kunai (Japanese knives),^{[S2 v1]} and make ice dolls (fragile mobile copies) of herself and of others.^{[S1 v5]}^{[S1 v9]} In the Japanese anime and drama CD, Mizore is voiced by Rie Kugimiya. In the English dub, she is voiced by Tia Ballard.

=== Ruby Tojo ===
Ruby Tojo (橙条 瑠妃, Tōjō Rubi; Anime: Rubi Tojo) is a witch who serves as an antagonist in the Witch's Knoll storyline, under her guardian Lady Oyakata. Her deep hatred for humans stems from a car accident by a human drunk driver that killed her parents, but after she experiences Tsukune's kindness, she has a change of heart.^{[S1 v4]} She appears at Yokai Academy to aid the headmaster, Tenmei Mikogami, on a variety of roles.^{[S1 v8]}^{[S2 v6]} She later reveals masochistic tendencies when interacting with Tsukune.^{[S2 v8 char profiles]} Ruby's magic theme typically involves ravens and flora, both as familiars and alternate forms for her to take.^{[S1 ch 23]}

In the anime series, her backstory is different: her parents are not mentioned; Oyakata is already dead, but lives in her mind as a delusion. She carries out Oyakata's actions from the manga against Tsukune and the girls.^{[S1 ep 10]} In the second season, her various jobs become a running gag where she has a "long story" as to how she got involved.^{[S2 ep 1]}^{[S2 ep 5]} In the Japanese anime and drama CD, she is voiced by Saeko Chiba. In the English dub, she is voiced by Leah Clark.^{[S2 ep 1 credits]}

=== Koko Shuzen ===
Koko Shuzen (朱染 心愛, Shuzen Koko; Anime: Kokoa Shuzen) (Note: The members of the Shuzen family have drink-based names: Moka is based on mocha; Koko is based on cocoa; Kalua is based on the Kahlúa drink.) is the second of the four Shuzen sisters; she becomes a student at Yokai Academy in the second manga serialization and anime season. She has a pet bat that can transform into a variety of weapons.^{[S2 ch 3]}^{[S2 v2]} As a child, Kokoa regularly fought Moka, but always lost. Upset that Moka sealed her powers, Kokoa enrolls in Yokai Academy to be with her, picking fights with her in order to draw out her inner personality.^{[S2 ch 3-4]} She also dislikes that her sister and the girls fawn over Tsukune, and refuses to be associated with the harem,^{[S2 ch 5]}^{[S2 ch 17]} although after they save her against the Karate Club, she joins the Newspaper Club (only in the manga).^{[S2 ch 8]} In the Season II epilogue bonus comics, she and Haiji Miyamoto officially go out, but their outings end up being non-romantic sparring sessions.^{[S2 v14 extras]} In the original Japanese anime, she is voiced by Chiwa Saitō. In the English dub, she is voiced by Kira Vincent-Davis.^{[S2 ep 1 credits]}

=== Ginei Morioka ===
Ginei Morioka (森丘 銀影, Morioka Gin'ei), nicknamed "Gin" (銀), is the president of the Newspaper Club, and a year senior to Tsukune. He delegates most of the work to Tsukune and the gang.^{[S1 v2]} He is good-looking and a ladies' man, although he is heavily perverted, which causes the Newspaper Club girls to keep their distance from him,^{[S1 ch 4]}^{[S2 ch 9]} as well as warn others of his behavior.^{[S2 ch 18-19]} Prior to the manga series, "Mad Dog" Morioka enjoys fighting and getting into trouble until the Newspaper Club president San Otonashi defeats him.^{[S2 ch 22]} His monster form is a werewolf.^{[S1 ch 4]}^{[S1 ep 6]} In the Season II epilogue bonus comics, he gets a job at San's inn after graduation.^{[S2 v14 extra]} In the Japanese anime and drama CD, Gin is voiced by Tomokazu Seki. He is voiced by Ian Sinclair in the English dub.

=== Fangfang Huang ===
Fangfang Huang (黄 芳芳, Won Fanfan) is an effeminate-looking first-year student and the son of a Chinese mafia leader whose family controls many of the country's dangerous monsters.^{[S2 ch 23]}^{[S2 v7 char profiles]} In an interview at Lucca Comics 2012, Ikeda said that he introduced Fangfang to increase the number of male characters and to attract a more female audience. He created a male counterpart that looks feminine to increase the comic element. As a yasha, Fangfang is adept at sorcery and can summon a monster, although what he summons is random,^{[S2 ch 23]} and often a harmless giant panda.^{[S2 ch 35]}^{[S2 ch 40]}^{[S2 ch 48]} After hearing that Tsukune single-handedly defeated a human yakuza group and Fairy Tale's 7th Branch Office (the latter was actually done by Gin and Haiji), he actively tries to recruit Tsukune to join his family. When he witnesses Moka's fighting ability, he assumes that she is Tsukune's number-one wife, and wishes to recruit her as well.^{[S2 ch 23]} He later realizes that his own talent is not in summoning, but in martial arts.^{[S2 ch 48]}

== Antagonists ==
Yokai Academy (陽海学園, Yōkai Gakuen) is a private boarding school with the purpose of teaching monsters how to coexist with humans. Its ground rules state that all monster students must appear as humans, but that any real humans on the premises are to be put to death. Tsukune and his Newspaper Club friends thus face a variety of student antagonists and groups, as well as teachers.

=== Students ===
The series follows a monster-of-the-week format in introducing the student antagonists. Other student characters are also introduced in the anime series.

- Saizo Komiya (小宮 砕蔵, Komiya Saizō), a classmate of Tsukune and Moka, is infatuated with Moka, but when he assaults her, he becomes the first victim of a beating by Moka when she transforms to her inner personality.^{[S1 v1]} His monster form in the anime is an orc.^{[S1 ep 1]} In the Japanese anime, he is voiced by Nobuyuki Hiyama. In the English dub, he is voiced by Robert McCollum.^{[S1 ep 1 credits]}
- Tadashi Wanibuchi (鰐淵 正, Wanibuchi Tadashi), a class representative, leads a group of lizardmen to ridicule Yukari.^{[S1 ep 3]} In the Japanese anime, he is voiced by Ryusei Nakao. In the English dub, he is voiced by Eric Vale.^{[S1 ep 3 credits]}
- Tamao Ichinose (一ノ瀬 珠魚, Ichinose Tamao) tries to recruit Tsukune to the swim club; as a mermaid, she exploits Moka's weakness to water.^{[S1 ep 5]} In the Japanese anime, she is voiced by Satsuki Yukino. In the English dub, she is voiced by Lydia Mackay.^{[S1 ep 5 credits]}
- Nagare Kano (叶 流行, Kanō Nagare) blackmails Kurumu into posing in embarrassing cosplay outfits and transforms into a slug.^{[S1 ch 7]}
- Junya Inui (乾 潤也, Inui Jun'ya), who appears in a bonus chapter following the end of the Season I manga serialization; he befriends Moka claiming to be a fellow vampire, but is really an onimodoki, a pseudo-demon that copies the forms of stronger monsters.^{[S1 ch 40]}
- The Fan Club Coalition appear only in the anime and is composed of three monster guys who idolize Moka, Yukari, and Kurumu. Unable to ever get girls on their own, they are jealous that Tsukune is always around the girls. Kozo Kasahara is the leader who likes Moka, and he transforms into an kasa-obake (umbrella monster). Kubisaku Nagai is the club's photographer who likes Yukari and transforms into a rokurokubi (humanoid with an elongated neck). Bosaburo Taira, who likes Kurumu, transforms into a noppera-bō (blob). They can also join into a larger monster.^{[S1 ep 4]}

=== Staff ===
In developing some of the teacher characters for the series, Ikeda said that he has great respect for real-life teachers, so he designed the monster ones to contrast that and be more comical. Several teachers serve as antagonists to Tsukune and the Newspaper Club girls.

- Hitomi Ishigami (石神 ひとみ, Ishigami Hitomi) is a Medusa and recurring villain in the first manga serialization and first anime season. As an art teacher, she helps Moka with a painting for Tsukune, but has been secretly luring female students and turning them into stone statues for her living art collection.^{[S1 v2]} When Tsukune and Moka defeat her, she is dismissed from the school in shame, but returns during the Protection Committee storyline to leak to Kuyo the secret that Tsukune is actually human.^{[S1 v3]} She also returns in the Lilith Mirror story as the instigator of the chaos that temporarily shuts down the school.^{[S1 ch 38]}
- Ririko Kagome (籠女 李々子, Kagome Ririko) is a math teacher who wears glasses, has a curvy chest and dresses in an extremely provocative style. Her monster identity is a lamia who brainwashes her male students so that they improve in math but end up emotionless and subservient to her.^{[S1 ch 12]} In the Japanese anime, Ririko is voiced by Aya Hisakawa. In the English dub, the students call her Miss Ririko, and she is voiced by Shelley Calene-Black.^{[S1 ep 8]}
- Okuto Kotsubo (小壷 奥人, Kotsubo Okuto) is the physical education teacher. Like Ginei, he has a perverted interest in the girls; he restrains himself, but hates that they "develop way too fast".^{[S1 ep 7]} When Mizore confesses her attraction to him, he tries to take advantage of her but gets frozen and has her suspended. He pins the injuries of two students on Mizore to have her expelled and then tries to kill her by transforming into a kraken.^{[S1 v5]} In the anime, Mizore does not have feelings for Kotsubo, but he takes advantage of her when she cries over Tsukune;^{[S1 ep 7]} He is voiced by Yasuyuki Kase in the Japanese anime, and by Christopher Sabat in the English dub.^{[S1 ep 7]}
- Apsara (亜婦皿, Apusara) is the cooking teacher exclusive to the anime series. She uses her curry to put the students under her spell, turning them curry-colored and hungering for more. Her monster form is an apsara (water nymph), where she can transform water into curry. In the Japanese anime, she is voiced by Kyoko Hikami. In the English dub, she is voiced by Nazia Chaudhry.^{[S2 ep 5]}
- Lilith (リリス, Ririsu) is a fairy-like artifact spirit. She carries the Lilith Mirror (リリスの鏡, Ririsu no Kagami), a hand mirror that reveals a monster's true form and their hidden desires but at the cost of the holder's soul. The mirror is given to Kyoko by Ishigami to cause a school-wide riot and capture Moka.^{[S1 v10]} After Ishigami is defeated again by the Newspaper Club, Lilith begins working as the headmaster's aide.^{[S2 ch 15]} In the anime, Kyoko accidentally obtains Lilith and the mirror during a run-in with Koko, who has planned to use it to retrieve Moka's inner personality.^{[S2 ep 11]} In the Japanese anime, Lilith is voiced by Maria Kawamura. In the English dub she is voiced by Maxey Whitehead.^{[S2 ep 11 credits]}

=== Protection Committee ===
The Protection Committee (公安委員会, Kōan'iinkai; Anime: Security Committee) enforces the school rules, but has grown corrupt. Their bullying has resulted in many clubs being shut down, including reducing the Newspaper Club members to Ginei Morioka.^{[S1 v2]} Notable members include:

- Kuyo (九曜, Kuyō), the leader of the committee. When Tsukune is put on trial for being a human, he critically injures Tsukune to the point where Moka has to infuse her vampire blood into Tsukune in order to save him.^{[S1 v3]}^{[S1 ep 13]} His monster form is a fox demon, and his abilities are fire-based.^{[S1 v3]} In the first manga serialization, he is defeated after Tsukune is infused with Moka's blood,^{[S1 ch 10]} but in the anime, Moka defeats him.^{[S1 ep 13]} In the second manga serialization, Kuyo remains a student at the academy, but works for Fairy Tale where he ascends to become the leader of its 3rd Branch.^{[S2 ch 52]} He faces Tsukune and Ruby when they are thrown into the fiery void created by the Masked King and is defeated by Tsukune.^{[s2 v11]} After the final battle with Alucard, he becomes Kiria's second-in-command.^{[S2 ch 66]} In the Japanese anime, Kuyo is voiced by Shuichi Ikeda. He is voiced by Jason Douglas in the English dub.^{[S1 ep 11 credits]}
- Keito (蛍糸), a girl with long purple hair who antagonizes the Newspaper Club and destroys their first news release.^{[S1 ep 11]} Her monster form is a jorōgumo (spider-woman).^{[S1 ch 8]} In the anime, Keito is in charge of a rival Yokai Square (陽海 SQ., Yokai SQ.) newspaper club which tries to replace the current one and whose members are former club leaders that were disbanded by the committee. She is voiced by Yukana in the Japanese anime and by Anastasia Muñoz in the English dub.^{[S1 ep 11 credits]}

=== Lady Oyakata ===
Lady Oyakata (お館様, Oyakata-sama) is a century-old witch who lives in the human world. She serves as Ruby's guardian and the main antagonist in the story involving the Witch's Knoll. She bears a great contempt for humans because they expanded into her territory. When land developers announce plans to turn her field into a garbage dump, she raises monster plants to attack tourists and then sets her army of plants to destroy the city. Like Ruby, her magic revolves around ravens and flora, the latter of which she can extend vines from her fingers to use as a weapon. She can also permanently merge with living creatures and acquire their powers. She is defeated when her magic object spellbook is destroyed, and as she dies she experiences a delusion where she is forgiven and rejoined by Ruby;^{[S1 v5]} in the anime, she is already dead but causes Ruby to have a delusion where she is receiving orders from her.^{[S1 ep 10]} Oyakata is voiced by Toshiko Maeda in the Japanese anime. ^{[S1 ep 10 credits]}

=== Anti-Schoolers and Monstrels ===
The Anti-Schoolers (反学派, Han gakuha) serve as the primary antagonists in the second half of the first manga serialization. Some of its members are revealed to be "monstrels": half-breeds that take no definitive, physical form of anything classified as a supernatural creature (such as vampires and werewolves). They have an extreme hatred of pure-blooded yōkai, whom they claim look down on half-breeds and force them into subservience. Their abilities include transforming parts of their body into weapons. They take winning fights very seriously: any member who loses, especially to a purebred, is executed.^{[S1 v5]} They despise Yokai Academy's goal of having monsters get along with humans, and want instead for the monsters to return to their base predatory natures. In volume 7 of the first manga series, they make threats to ruin the School Festival and assign blame to the Newspaper Club.^{[S1 v7]} It is later revealed that Hokuto Kaneshiro, the president of the School Committee, is secretly the leader of the Anti-Schoolers.^{[S1 v8]} The group does not appear in the anime adaptation, as the anime focuses more on the romantic comedy aspect of the series, although individual monstrel characters have made appearances as antagonists.^{[S1 v5]}

- Hokuto Kaneshiro (金城 北都, Kaneshiro Hokuto) is introduced as a charismatic student council president who quickly befriends Tsukune after the latter joins to work on the school festival.^{[S1 v8]} Prior to the start of the series, Hokuto is a human who has suffered years of physical abuse from his father. Hoping to escape, he enrolls in Yokai but only finds death; he admits he never had anyone to protect him. His monster form is suppressed by a spirit lock similar to Tsukune's; when unleashed, he transforms into a giant insect-like skeletal creature with massive blades for appendages.^{[S1 v9]} In human form, his martial-arts ability allows him to strike with rock-shattering force. In the Anti-Schoolers storyline, he tricks the Newspaper Club into capturing him, only to steal the headmaster's rosary in order to shut down the barrier between the human and monster world.^{[S1 v8]} Following his defeat, when he sees that Tsukune and the girls make great efforts to restore the barrier, he helps them out. He reconciles with Tsukune, but summarily leaves the school with Anti-Schoolers colleague Kiria Yoshi.^{[S1 v9]} In the second serialization, Hokuto, who uses a wheelchair, joins Fairy Tale as the 1st Branch Staff Officer.^{[S2 ch 28]} After Moka is taken by Aqua, he and Kiria form a temporary alliance with Tsukune to rescue Moka by providing information on Fairy Tale's main headquarters,^{[S2 v9]}^{[S2 v10]} and background assistance against Fairy Tale's leader Gyokuro.^{[S2 v12]} In the final battle against Alucard, he overextends his strength and powers, and falls into a coma.^{[S2 ch 66, and v14 extra]}
- Kiria Yoshi (吉井 霧亜, Yoshii Kiria; Kiriya Yoshi) is the second-in-command of the Anti-Schoolers. He is a calm and collected member who is occasionally seen carrying and reading a copy of Osamu Dazai's novel No Longer Human.^{[S1 v7]} His monster ability allows him to shape his right arm into a scythe. He is later revealed to be the one who transformed Hokuto into a monster so that he could "survive" the dangers of the academy.^{[S1 v9]} Following the defeat of the Anti-Schoolers, he and Hokuto leave Yokai Academy.^{[S1 v9]} He reappears in the second manga serialization where he airlifts Miyabi and Kahlua Shuzen to safety,^{[S2 ch 14]} As the deputy leader of the Fairy Tale 1st Branch, he orders a gremlin monster to eat Fangfang's plane.^{[S2 ch 28]} When Aqua captures Moka, he and Hokuto offer assistance to the Newspaper Club,^{[S2 v9]} and in the process, faces his leader Miyabi in a duel.^{[S2 v11]} However, that turns out to be a ruse as he sides with the Masked King. His true monster form is a chimera created by using Alucard's flesh as a base.^{[S2 ch 63]} In the final chapter, following Alucard's fall, he takes over Fairy Tale.^{[S2 ch 66]}
- Kusabi Mido (御堂 楔, Midō Kusabi) is one of the monstrel enforcers.^{[S1 v5]} He takes it upon himself to kill Tsukune after witnessing his temporary vampiric powers. He disables Moka and deals a near-fatal blow to Tsukune, which forces Moka to infuse Tsukune. Mido is brutally pummeled by the ghoul Tsukune but is spared when Mikogami and Ruby intervene. At the infirmary, Mako critically injures him.^{[S1 v6]}^{[S1 v7]} At the end of the series, he reappears briefly to help the school fight Alucard's clones.^{[S2 ch 66.5]}
- Mako Yakumaru (薬丸 麻子, Yakumaru Mako) is a monstrel whose role as "The Cleaner" is to execute the faction members that fail their missions. She disguises herself as a school nurse at the infirmary, and projects from her fingers tentacle-like barbs that inject hypnotic fluids. In the manga story, she injects Moka and directs her to attack Tsukune, but Moka eventually fights off its effects.^{[S1 v6]}^{[S1 v7]} She later helps Yokai Academy fight off Alucard's clones.^{[S2 ch 66.5]} In the anime, where there is no monstrel faction, she is introduced as the school's nurse where she helps a distraught Yukari fulfill her wish of growing up by injecting her in a similar fashion as in the manga; her reason is so she can feed on Yukari's negative emotions. Mako is voiced by Mariko Kouda in the Japanese anime, and by Jennifer Seman in the English dub.^{[S2 ep 4]}

=== Fairy Tale ===
Fairy Tale (御伽の国（フェアリー・テイル）, Fearī Teiru) is an organization dedicated to throwing harmony into chaos and ruling over the human world; the group appears in the second serialization of the manga series as the primary antagonists.^{[S2 v5]} Their base of operations is the Hanging Garden (空中庭園, Kūchū Teien), a large sky fortress above Japan which is hidden by a magical barrier similar to that of Yokai Academy.^{[S2 v9]} Members of Fairy Tale include former Anti-Schooler leaders Hokuto Kaneshiro and Kiriya Yoshi, as well as Protection Committee leader Kuyo.

- Miyabi Fujisaki (藤咲 雅, Fujisaki Miyabi) is the leader of Fairy Tale's 1st Subdivision. He first appears when Fairy Tale makes a deal with the snow fairies to marry or capture Mizore Shirayuki in order to acquire power in their world. He forcibly kisses and fondles her before she is rescued by Tsukune and his friends.^{[S2 ch 11-12]} He then stops the fight between Kahlua and Moka and cancels Kalua's assassination order.^{[S2 ch 14]} In later chapters, he reveals himself to be the Masked King (仮面の王, Kamen no Ō), the true leader of Fairy Tale who had orchestrated the feud between the Huang and Miao mafia families by killing the Miao leader and forcing the leader's son Xilong to work for him.^{[S1 v11]} After Fairy Tale commander-in-chief Gyokuro Shuzen is defeated, he reveals himself to be a human-form clone of the ancient vampire Alucard after which he merges with his monster form.^{[S2 v13]}
- Kahlua Shuzen (朱染 刈愛, Shuzen Karua; Kalua Shuzen) is the second oldest of the four Shuzen sisters. She has light hair and a dark complexion. Although she exhibits a naive, childlike personality, she is a top assassin.^{[S2 ch 13]} Her fighting style is like a mad person: when she gets angered, she can kill without feeling.^{[S2 ch 13]} Her crucifix earrings act as power restraints, similar to Moka's rosario; when one is taken off, she can transform her arm into an array of a sharp bat wing.^{[S2 ch 14]} She can block out pain during a battle, but risks incurring fatal wounds because of it.^{[S2 ch 14]} When both off her earrings are removed, her body becomes a blood-like liquid where she can survive decapitations, transform both hands into razor wings, and discharge drops of herself as high velocity concussive projectiles.^{[s2 ch 63]} Kahlua first appears in the Land of the Snow Fairies to facilitate alliance negotiations between the Snow Fairies and Fairy Tale; but if the alliance is not accepted, she is to execute everyone. She decimates the Newspaper Club, and fights Moka with an earring removed until Miyabi intervenes and cancels the order.^{[S2 ch 13-14]} At the Fairy Tale headquarters, she supports her mother in fighting the Newspaper Club. After Koko fatally stabs her while she is paralyzed by holy water, Kahlua reveals that the chaos she and her mother has been causing was to win back their father's heart.^{[s2 v13]} In the final Season II volume, Miyabi infuses her with his First Ancestor blood, stating that she was "too innocent to die";^{[S2 ch66]} in the epilogue bonus comics, she makes a miraculous recovery, and partners with Akua to grow the Shuzen family's influence.^{[S2 v14 extra]} Her name is based on Kahlúa, a coffee-flavored liqueur.
- Kanade Kamiya (神谷 奏, Kamiya Kanade) is a siren who is the leader of the 7th Branch Office of Fairy Tale. Four years prior to his appearance in the series, he kills San's employer's husband simply for fun, and his singing, even when recorded, can kill humans and blind monsters. His Water Mirror ability allows him to teleport in helpers from the office such as mermen.^{[S2 ch 21]} In his monster form, he sprouts wings and is able to shoot feather blades. He can amplify his sound and launch his ultimate attack, "Symphony for the Devil". In a failed attempt to recruit San into Fairy Tale, he is defeated by her, who uses her own ultimate song to break down his body.^{[S2 ch 22]}
- Akua Shuzen (朱染 亞愛, Shuzen Akua) is the eldest of the four Shuzen sisters. Prior to joining the Shuzen family, Akua grew up in China, as her mother died when she was young.^{[S2 v8]} When her friend Jasmine is staked by humans, Akua joins Fairy Tale, vowing to destroy humanity.^{[S2 ch 65.2]} She joins the Miao mafia family as one of their top assassins known as the Black Devil.^{[S2 ch 36]} Akua's Chinese martial arts abilities^{[s2 v9 char profiles]} include a Cross-Step Fist Block (Yōho Saishusui) that can knock a person out for at least three days,^{[S2 ch 30]} and the Dimension Sword (崩月次元刀, Hōgetsu Jigen-Tō; Moon Crushing Dimensional Sword), a technique used by Tohofuhai.^{[S2 ch 36]} She attempts to acquire Akasha's blood in order to gain extraordinary power,^{[S2 ch 31]} but in the process, causes Moka to awaken Alucard with her blood. She makes a promise with Akasha to keep Moka safe.^{[S2 ch 36]} Some years later, she captures Moka so that her stepmother Gyokuro Shuzen can use her to awaken Alucard.^{[S2 v8]} Despite going against the Newspaper Club, she later sides with them to save Moka and helps Tsukune master his vampire abilities by creating a magic circle that allows her and the rest of his allies to empower him.^{[S2 ch 66.3-66.4]} In the Season II epilogue bonus comic, she is the future head of the Shuzen family.^{[S2 v14]}
- Gyokuro Shuzen (朱染 玉露, Shuzen Gyokuro) is the matriarch of the Shuzen family^{[S2 ch 31]} and the Commander-in-Chief of Fairy Tale,^{[S2 ch 43]} second only to the Masked King. She is the birth mother of Kahlua and Koko.^{[S2 ch 31]}^{[S2 ch 43]} Her "Enemy Zero" ability allows her to sense enemies no matter where they are in Fairy Tale's headquarters,^{[S2 ch 43]} but also allows her to duplicate and master those abilities.^{[S2 ch 60]} She captures Moka so she can use the rosario in a device she made to awaken and to control Alucard.^{[S2 ch 56]} She turns many of the Shuzen family members into grotesque ghouls by implanting pieces of Alucard into their bodies.^{[S2 ch 59]} When Tsukune defeats her,^{[S2 ch 60]} she fuses with Alucard,^{[S2 ch 61]} but she is unable to land a finishing blow on Moka because the rosario connects with Akasha and not Alucard. After Moka takes back her rosario, Gyokuro is quickly devoured by Alucard.^{[S2 ch 64]}

When the Newspaper Club invades Fairy Tale's headquarters, they face a number of divisional leaders: Raika (雷禍), the leader of the 5th Branch, a thunder beast who uses lightning-based attacks^{[S2 v10]}, Ludie (露蝶, Rūtie), the deputy leader of the 4th Branch who is a sadistic girl in a polka-dot dress who carries a chainsaw, Xilong Miao (苗 西龍, Myao Shāron), the leader of the 4th Branch and also the leader of the Miao family; he and Fangfang were childhood friends until the Masked King murdered his father and forced Xilong and the Miao family to work for Fairy Tale.^{[S2 v11]}

=== Issa Shuzen ===
Issa Shuzen (朱染 一茶, Shuzen Issa) is Moka's father and the patriarch of the Shuzen family, which is well-known and respected for its reputation of dealing with "problems" in the underworld. In the manga, he mainly appears in Moka's memories when he introduces his daughter Aqua.^{[S2 ch 7]} In later chapters, he appears as the 2nd Branch Leader of Fairy Tale, but it is actually a doppelganger who has assumed his likeness.^{[S2 v13]} In the epilogue chapter of Season II, it is revealed that he was imprisoned during the Fairy Tale and Alucard storylines and has been rebuilding his family. Originally hired through Fairy Tale to kill Tsukune, he reveals that he was actually hired by the Bus Driver to be Tsukune's trainer.^{[S2 ch 66.6]} In the anime, Issa assumes Akasha's roles of the being the third Dark Lord. He creates Moka's rosario and the one used for the school barrier, but acts as the final antagonist in the second season. In the Japanese anime, he is voiced by Katsuji Mori. In the English dub, he is voiced by J. Michael Tatum.^{[S2 ep 13]}

=== Alucard ===
Alucard (アルカード, Arukādo) is introduced as one of the oldest and most powerful "First Ancestor" (Note: Ikeda describes a First Ancestor as a vampire whose powers can only be passed by transfusing blood and not by inheritance. Their blood is synchronized with other First Ancestor vampires so when one awakens, the others follow.^{[S2 v8]}) vampires who have attempted to wipe out humanity.^{[S2 ch 31]} He assumes the form of a giant creature with a bone-like exterior,^{[S2 v8]} having absorbed countless creatures into his body.^{[S2 ch 31]} Over 200 years ago, (Note: In the Season II manga, Alucard awakens from his slumber 200 years prior to Moka's tenth birthday instead of the 500 years as listed in the Jump Square profiles for the related characters. The events where the Newspaper Club invades Fairy Tale HQ occur about seven years afterwards.^{[S2 ch 33]}) he is defeated by Akasha Bloodriver and the other Dark Lords.^{[S2 v8]} Akasha applies a blood seal that synchronizes his blood with her own, and he is placed in a room underneath the Shuzen manor. He is awakened momentarily when Moka activates her First Ancestor blood, and he tries to feed on Moka, but Akasha frees her from his grasp and fuses with him.^{[S2 v8]} His dormant body is then moved to Fairy Tale's main headquarters,^{[S2 ch 42]} where Gyokuro attempts to awaken him by capturing Moka and unsealing her rosario.^{[S2 v11]} In the final chapter, it is revealed that he is Dracula, the 15th century vampire king who tried to build a world where vampires and humans could coexist but was rejected by the humans, and so he reversed the letters of his name and left with a little girl (Akasha) to seek to rebuild his kingdom.^{[S2 ch 66.6]}

== Supporting characters ==
=== Students ===
- Haiji Miyamoto (宮本 灰次, Miyamoto Haiji) is the captain of the Karate Club. He first appears during the club recruitment days where he teases Koko Shuzen, admitting he likes little girls,^{[S2 ch 8]} and later clarifying that he likes them regardless of their actual age.^{[S2 ch 22]} He joins Gin at the raid of the 7th Branch Office of Fairy Tale in order to help San Otonashi.^{[S2 ch 21]} He uses a Vacuum Punch as a mid-range attack.^{[S2 ch 22]} During the raid on Fairy Tale headquarters, he reveals his monster form of a Crow Tengu.^{[S2 ch 58]} In the Season II epilogue bonus comics, he begins dating Koko Shuzen (although "neither of them has any idea what a relationship is" and their dates end up being sparring sessions).^{[S2 v14 extras]}
- Lingling Huang (黄 鈴鈴, Won Rinrin) is Fangfang's older sister who transfers in as a third-year student.^{[S2 ch 24]} She is a jiangshi (hopping zombie);^{[S2 ch 24]}^{[S2 v7 char profiles]} she often points out her undead status with the catchphrase "After all, I'm dead" or by removing her head from her body.^{[S2 ch 24]} She summons other jiangshi, as demonstrated during the school's sports day.^{[S2 ch 24]} As the apprentice of Tohofuhai, she can use the Dimension Sword technique,^{[S2 ch 35]} but as a strategist to the Huang family she resorts to other weapons and methods to defeat her opponent.^{[S2 ch 36]}
- Three female students serve as recurring background characters in the anime series: Tonko Oniyama has long black hair, Shijimi Chono has short red hair, Sumae Mizuno has short brown hair and glasses. They introduce themselves by name in the episode "Youth and Vampire".^{[S2 ep 8]}

=== Staff ===
- Bus Driver (バスの運転手さん, Basu no Untenju-san), who provides transportation between the human and monster worlds, makes occasional appearances in the series where he offers advice to Tsukune.^{[S1 ch 1]}^{[S1 v4]} According to Ikeda, his identity as a monster or human is not revealed until the tail end of the second manga serialization when he "hacks" Fairy Tale's mainframe to prevent its headquarters from crash-landing.^{[S2 ch 64]} In the epilogue of Season II, his name is revealed to be Nurari (Nurarihyon) and he hires Moka's father to train Tsukune to one day become the new headmaster of Yokai Academy.^{[S2 ch 66.6]} The Bus Driver is voiced by Norihiro Inoue in the original Japanese anime; in the English dub, his voice is provided by Chuck Huber.^{[S1 ep 1 credits]}
- Shizuka Nekonome (猫目 静, Nekonome Shizuka) is Tsukune and Moka's homeroom teacher, and the advisor of the Newspaper Club.^{[S1 ch 3]} In developing some of the teacher characters for the series, Ikeda said that he has great respect for real-life teachers, so he designed the monster ones to contrast that and be more comical. As a catgirl, she has a carefree attitude and is sometimes oblivious of her situation; the anime has a running gag where the students point out her exposed tail and she gets embarrassed.^{[S1 ep 5]} She is easily distracted by anything concerning fish as shown in the school festival^{[S1 v9]} and the Newspaper Club field trip.^{[S1 v4]} However, she is committed to the school tenet of promoting relationships between monsters and humans.^{[S1 ep 12]} In the Japanese anime and drama CD, she is voiced by Kikuko Inoue.^{[S1 ep 1 credits]} In the English dub, her voice is provided by Jamie Marchi.^{[S1 ep 1 credits]}
- Tenmei Mikogami (御子神 典明, Mikogami Tenmei) is the headmaster of Yokai Academy. He wears a religious habit and long robes with a rosary. He is first introduced as an exorcist who places a "spirit lock" on Tsukune to seal his ghoul nature.^{[S1 v7]} He has learned from Tohofuhai how to cast barriers; he places one to separate the monster school from the human world and uses his rosary as part of the seal.^{[S1 v8]} Although he knows Tsukune is a human, he permits him to stay as long as he helps deal with the threat of the Anti-Schoolers.^{[S1 v8]} He later helps Tsukune train by placing him and Ruby in a "Paradise" world which is a beast-monster sanctuary.^{[S2 v4]} He eventually reveals his monster form as a kishin (demon god) when he fights Alucard, and sacrifices his life to ensure Akasha and Alucard's self-disintegration spell would succeed.^{[S2 ch 66]} In the anime, he is the one who drops the flyer for Yokai Academy that Tsukune's father finds. He is voiced by Masaharu Sato in the Japanese anime and by Paul Slavens in the English dub.^{[S1 ep 13]}

=== Alumni ===
- Tsurara Shirayuki (白雪 つらら, Shirayuki Tsurara) is Mizore's mother. Like her daughter, she observes Tsukune from behind a corner, but can generate ice spikes when stressed. When she visits Yokai Academy, she assumes Tsukune and Mizore are a couple,^{[S1 v9]} and when the Newspaper Club visits her Snow Fairy world, she hopes that they will give her grandchildren.^{[S2 ch 10]} She harbors a collection of firearms that shoot snow-based ammo such as ice bullets.^{[S2 ch 12]} In the second season of the anime, she and Kurumu's mother have an ongoing rivalry, originating from their days at Yokai. In the Japanese anime, Tsurara is voiced by Yuko Minaguchi. In the English dub, her voice is provided by Cynthia Cranz.^{[S2 ep 3]}
- Ageha Kurono (黒乃 アゲハ, Kurono Ageha) is Kurumu's mother who appears at the school festival under the belief that Tsukune and Kurumu are a couple. She has large breasts and is more flirtatious than her daughter.^{[S1 ch 36]} In the anime series, Ageha and Tsurara have a rivalry since their time as students at Yokai Academy.^{[S2 ep 3]} She fights her daughter in the episode where Tsukune heads to Issa Shuzen's castle.^{[S2 ep 13]} Ageha is voiced by Chieko Honda in the Japanese anime, and by Kelly McHalen in the English dub.^{[S2 ep 3 credits]}
- San Otonashi (音無 燦, Otonashi San) is a graduate of Yokai Academy and former president of the Newspaper Club; she works at a seaside inn. Her story was developed to reflect the feelings and struggles of young people as they ponder their futures and transitioning into the working world.^{[S2 v5 author's notes]} She has a young and petite appearance, and almost never speaks, preferring to write out her thoughts on a sketchbook. Her monster form is a siren who sprouts angel-like wings. Although she can sing songs that cancel the effects of other sirens, her true power comes from her attack songs; her ultrasonic song "Silence in the Dark" causes her opponent's body to internally disintegrate. Gin remarks that San's sketchbook is actually her power limiter, and that she is one of the strongest students in the history of Yokai Academy.^{[S2 v5]} She reappears in the final battle against Alucard and in the epilogue bonus comics where Ginei becomes her co-worker.^{[S2 v14]}

=== Dark Lords ===
Over two centuries before the events in the series, the Three Dark Lords defeat and seal the vampire monster Alucard. In addition to Tenmei Mikogami, there are:

- Tohofuhai (東方不敗, Tōhōfuhai) is introduced in the second serialization as a patriarch of the Huang family.^{[S2 ch 27]} He has taught Tenmei Mikogami his sealing techniques,^{[S2 ch 27]} and is the originator of the Dimension Sword technique. Although he appears as an old man, he can transform into a younger version of himself. He enjoys being an otaku;^{[S2 v8 char profiles]} in his introductory chapter, he tricks Moka into dressing up as Lum from Urusei Yatsura before repairing her rosario.^{[S2 ch 29 footnotes]} In the final battle, he, along with Mikogami sacrifice their lives to support Akasha and Alucard's self-disintegration spell.^{[S2 ch 66]}
- Akasha Bloodriver (アカーシャ=ブラッドリバー, Akāsha Buraddoribā) is Moka's mother.^{[S2 v7]} Tohofuhai describes her as a strong, yet sad woman who carries a heavy burden.^{[S2 v7]} Her appearance is the same as the outer personality of Moka.^{[S2 v7]} Despite being kind and gentle, Akasha is one of the First Ancestor vampires and the de facto leader of the Three Dark Lords.^{[S2 ch 31]} when they sealed Alucard.^{[S2 v7]} However, her sealing method involves synchronizing her blood to her target, and thus whenever she unleashes her full power, it causes Alucard to wake, thus she watches over Alucard when it resides in the Shuzen manor.^{[S2 v8]} After giving birth to Moka, Akasha transfuses her First Ancestor blood into her in order to keep her alive.^{[S2 ch 32-33]} When Moka discovers Alucard's body, Akasha forces her to leave the Shuzen household, and destroys all their photos and records, except for the rosario.^{[S2 v8]}^{[S2 ch 31]} When Alucard awakens and captures Moka, Akasha frees her and sacrifices her own body to put Alucard back to sleep.^{[S2 ch 34]}^{[S2 ch 42]} She is the original user of the catchphrase "Know your place" (身の程を知れ, Minohodo o shire).^{[S2 ch 33]} Seven years before the final battle, she reveals to Aqua that she has actually erased her memories and sealed her mind into Moka's rosario, thus creating the Moka's outer persona. In the final chapter, she manifests as part of Alucard; they agree to end the fighting and cast a self-disintegration spell.^{[S2 ch 66]}

=== Others ===
- Mysterious Bat (謎こうもり, Nazokōmori), also known as Ko (こーちゃん, Kō-chan; Batty), is Koko's shapeshifting pet bat. He can transform himself into a variety of weapons.^{[S2 v1]} In the manga, he has no speaking lines; and prefers to squeak or communicate with placards, as shown when Koko gets in trouble.^{[S2 ch 8]} In the anime, he has a prominent role as the narrator and commentator, where he announces Moka's transformations, monster information, and the duration of Moka's fights. and in the second season, occasionally blocks fanservice shots on certain television broadcasts.^{[S2 ep 1]} In one of the anime episodes, he assumes the guise of a student named Kotaro Ijuin (伊集院 光太郎, Ijūin Kōtarō) and tries to enslave the student body as an incubus.^{[S2 ep 10]} In the Japanese dub, he is credited as Mysterious Bat and is voiced by Takehito Koyasu. In the English dub, he is credited as The Bat and called Ko; he is voiced by Jerry Jewell.^{[S2 ep 2 credits]}
- Kyoko Aono (青野 響子, Aono Kyōko) is Tsukune's tomboyish 17-year-old cousin. When she visits Yokai Academy, Tsukune and his friends attempt to keep her from learning their school's true nature, as well as preventing the school authorities from discovering she is human.^{[S1 v9]} The Newspaper Club members describe her as dense as she does not believe there are actual monsters at the academy, thinking it is remarkable CG special effects or cosplay, until the evidence becomes overwhelming; after which she accepts Tsukune and his friends.^{[S1 v10]} Kyoko is voiced by Sachiko Kojima in the Japanese anime and by Cherami Leigh in the English dub.^{[S2 ep 11 credits]}
- Kasumi Aono (青野 かすみ, Aono Kasumi) is Tsukune's mother. She is shocked that Tsukune brings so many pretty girls to their house, but is happy to finally meet Moka, about whom she has heard so much from Tsukune.^{[S1 ch 39]}^{[S2 ep 7]} Her husband only briefly appears in the manga,^{[S1 ch 39]}^{[S2 ch 66]} but in both the manga and the anime, he finds the Yokai Academy application.^{[S1 ch1]}^{[S1 ep 1]} Kasumi is voiced by Haruhi Terada in the Japanese anime and by Maeghan Albach in the English dub.^{[S2 ep 7 credits]}

== Reception ==
The characters of Rosario + Vampire have received criticism from publications dedicated to anime, manga, and other media. Theron Martin of Anime News Network describes Tsukune as a "cookie-cutter harem male lead, an unfailingly kind-hearted, indecisive wimp who primarily has a thing for Moka but still treasures the other girls as friends." Carlo Santos of Anime News Network, in reviewing the manga, noted Tsukune's character design as lazy: "shove in any other male protagonist from a harem series and nobody would notice too much". He found the girls "distinctive, if predictable (the beauty, the boobs, the jailbait)", but concluded in a later volume that "The story's never going to go anywhere, the characters are never going to go anywhere, and the artwork is always going to have that same polished-but-flawed look." Stig Høgset of THEM Anime Reviews found Moka to be ditzy and a "pink-haired dolt"; he criticized her lack of vampire weaknesses such as walking around in broad daylight at a beach, but found her alternate personality as "pretty damn badass", "a great addition to the show, if a severely underutilized one", and wished that her character was developed better. Deb Aoki of About.com called Moka a magical ditz who loves the doofus but also kicks butt. Neil Lumbard of DVD Talk noted that Kokoa is not another character that has a massive crush on the same guy; however, Høgset noted that her anime role was reduced to obnoxious comedy acts.

Carlo Santos, in reviewing the manga volumes, found the antagonist monster designs to interest him the most, and wished Ikeda would have focused the story on action-fantasy themed manga. He called antagonist Hokuto Kaneshiro a "dead ringer for Light Yagami from Death Note" and smarter than the usual monsters of the week, but the storyline he is placed in is predictable. Although he liked that Hokuto had a "shocking truth....that could have been a game-changer for the series", he was disappointed in Ikeda's resolution to the story: "Hokuto has an arbitrary, unconvincing change of heart, school life is reset to the way it was, and the villain walks off as if nothing happened." He found the canned phrases of the girls fighting in some of the comedy chapters to be entertaining, including Kyoko's gold mine of one-liners. Høgset found the bat to be really obnoxious with its spouting useless trivia, repeating what happens to Moka, and things that bring the story to a grinding halt or "make you want to bludgeon your brain out of your cranium with something made of metal". Serdar Yegulalp of About.com also agrees about the bat bringing the action to dead halt. He found the character introductions repetitive, and wished they would deviate from the harem formula and develop into lively, sympathetic ones like with Ouran High School Host Club.

The anime series, directed by Takayuki Inagaki who has worked on Desert Punk and Indian Summer, has an abundance of fanservice and panty shots that have been heavily criticized from reviewers in manga and anime, who have compared the show to panty-ridden series such as Najica Blitz Tactics and Agent Aika. Lumbard was disgusted by the fanservice of weird sexual imagery around Yukari, and lowered his overall opinion of the second anime series because of it. Høgset wrote that the series was like Shuffle! with more fanservice with "average 'all the girls dotes on the guy' stupidity". Deb Aoki found the fanservice in the manga to be a bit unwholesome and cheesy, but underneath were teen themes about friendship, loyalty, and courage. Reception on the characters' fanservice has been acknowledged by Ikeda. In the bonus comics at the end of Season II, Volume 6, Ikeda responds to a fan letter that criticizes that the Newspaper Club girls artwork in the manga is not as moe as in the anime by having them go over aspects of moe that has already incorporated such as cat ears, knee socks, large breasts, twin tails, long bangs, as well as what the girls would look like when drawn with large eyes, distinguishing accessories and speech inflections.^{[S2 v6 omake2]} When asked in an interview about the fewer panty shots compared to other shōnen manga; Ikeda replied that he favors showing less as it would be more erotic and intriguing.

Høgset compared Tsukune to the main male protagonist Riku Aoba from Tokimeki Memorial ~Only Love~, "right down to the nasally whiny voice". Martin noted the voice performances of the English dub to be very solid, with Alexis Tipton "exactly hitting the mark in the key role as the human-form Moka", Todd Haberkorn as "Funimation's go-to guy for wimpy male leads", Monica Rial as natural for Yukari, and Jerry Jewell as "great but nearly unrecognizable as the bat". He also liked the dubbing of the insert songs, "Other dubbing companies could learn something from them on this, as at least the actors used for the songs can actually sing".

In 2008, Moka was elected by UGO Networks as the fortieth "sexiest vampire" in their list of Top 50 Sexiest Vampires in entertainment history, with the staff commenting on her relation with Tsukune, and that she "turns into a fierce predator that kicks ass with abandon".

== Merchandise ==
Rosario + Vampire characters have been made into figurines, key chains (including Moka's rosario), cellphone straps, and pin sets. One company has made playing cards of the characters. Funimation announced that it has licensed the merchandise rights for products in North America.

Character songs were developed to accompany the anime series and published by King Records in 2008. They include single albums by each of the Newspaper Club girls, and the girls combined, some of which have a lyrics credit to Yasushi Akimoto of AKB48 fame. Moka's first character single debuted at number 42 on the Oricon weekly chart, and remained for four weeks. Her character single for the second anime series reached number 40, and remained for three weeks. Drama CDs also accompany the series, and feature the voice actors from the anime series in additional stories.

== Works cited ==
=== Rosario + Vampire manga ===
==== First serialization ====
- Ikeda, Akihisa ロザリオとバンパイア. (in Japanese) 10 vols. Tokyo: Shueisha, 2004–2007.
- Ikeda, Akihisa Rosario + Vampire. 10 vols. San Francisco: Viz Media, 2008–2009.
- Vol. 1 (ch. 1–4): ロザリオとバンパイア 1 (in Japanese). October 2004. ISBN 4-08-873665-6. and Vampires. June 2008. ISBN 978-1-4215-1903-6.
- Vol. 2 (ch. 5–8): ロザリオとバンパイア 2 (in Japanese). February 2005. ISBN 4-08-873776-8. and Witches. August 2003. ISBN 978-1-4215-1904-3.
- Vol. 3 (ch. 9–12): ロザリオとバンパイア 3 (in Japanese). June 2005. ISBN 4-08-873823-3. and Trolls. October 2008. ISBN 978-1-4215-1905-0.
- Vol. 4 (ch. 13–16): ロザリオとバンパイア 4 (in Japanese). October 2005. ISBN 4-08-873869-1. and Carnivorous Plant. December 2008. ISBN 978-1-4215-1906-7.
- Vol. 5 (ch. 17–20): ロザリオとバンパイア 5 (in Japanese). February 2006. ISBN 4-08-874024-6. and Abominable Snowgirl. February 2009. ISBN 978-1-4215-1907-4.
- Vol. 6 (ch. 21–24): ロザリオとバンパイア 6 (in Japanese). June 2006. ISBN 4-08-874116-1. and Ghouls. March 2009. ISBN 978-1-4215-1908-1.
- Vol. 7 (ch. 25–28): ロザリオとバンパイア 7 (in Japanese). October 2006. ISBN 4-08-874270-2. and Exorcist. June 2009. ISBN 978-1-4215-1909-8.
- Vol. 8 (ch. 29–32): ロザリオとバンパイア 8 (in Japanese). February 2007. ISBN 978-4-08-874324-0. and Shikigami. August 2009. ISBN 978-1-4215-1910-4.
- Vol. 9 (ch. 33–36): ロザリオとバンパイア 9 (in Japanese). June 2007. ISBN 978-4-08-874372-1. and Monster Mamas. October 2009. ISBN 978-1-4215-2354-5.
- Vol. 10 (ch. 37–40): ロザリオとバンパイア 10 (in Japanese). October 2007. ISBN 978-4-08-874449-0. and Magic Mirror. November 2009. ISBN 978-1-4215-2355-2.

==== Second serialization ====
- Ikeda, Akihisa ロザリオとバンパイア season2. (in Japanese) 14 vols. Tokyo: Shueisha, 2008–14.
- Ikeda, Akihisa Rosario + Vampire Season II. 14 vols. San Francisco: Viz Media, 2010–15.
- Vol. 1 (ch. 1–4): ロザリオとバンパイア season2 1 (in Japanese). June 2008. ISBN 978-4-08-874506-0. and Monster Fruit. April 2010. ISBN 978-1-4215-3136-6.
- Vol. 2 (ch. 5–8): ロザリオとバンパイア season2 2 (in Japanese). October 2008. ISBN 978-4-08-874586-2. and Magical Candy. August 2010. ISBN 978-1-4215-3137-3.
- Vol. 3 (ch. 9–12): ロザリオとバンパイア season2 3 (in Japanese). February 2009. ISBN 978-4-08-874637-1. and Snow Oracle. December 2010. ISBN 978-1-4215-3268-4.
- Vol. 4 (ch. 13–17): ロザリオとバンパイア season2 4 (in Japanese). June 2009. ISBN 978-4-08-874679-1. and Inner Ghoul. April 2011. ISBN 978-1-4215-3544-9.
- Vol. 5 (ch. 18–22): ロザリオとバンパイア season2 5 (in Japanese). October 2009. ISBN 978-4-08-874745-3. and Siren Song. July 2011. ISBN 978-1-4215-3691-0.
- Vol. 6 (ch. 23–26): ロザリオとバンパイア season2 6 (in Japanese). February 2010. ISBN 978-4-08-870008-3. and Gangstah. October 2011. ISBN 978-1-4215-3831-0.
- Vol. 7 (ch. 27–30): ロザリオとバンパイア season2 7 (in Japanese). June 2010. ISBN 978-4-08-870057-1. and Vanishing Acts. January 2012. ISBN 978-1-4215-4026-9.
- Vol. 8 (ch. 31–35): ロザリオとバンパイア season2 8 (in Japanese). October 2010. ISBN 978-4-08-870122-6. and The Secret of the Rosario. April 2012. ISBN 978-1-4215-4050-4.
- Vol. 9 (ch. 36–41): ロザリオとバンパイア season2 9 (in Japanese). June 2011. ISBN 978-4-08-870213-1. and Fairy Tale. July 2012. ISBN 978-1-4215-4209-6.
- Vol. 10 (ch. 42–47): ロザリオとバンパイア season2 10 (in Japanese). December 2011. ISBN 978-4-08-870349-7. and Kidnapped. November 2012. ISBN 978-1-42-154879-1.
- Vol. 11 (ch. 48–53): ロザリオとバンパイア season2 11 (in Japanese). June 2012. ISBN 978-4-08-870425-8. and Rescue Mission. March 2013. ISBN 978-1-42-155240-8.
- Vol. 12 (ch. 54–59): ロザリオとバンパイア season2 12 (in Japanese). April 2013. ISBN 978-4-08-870570-5. and Awakening. October 2013. ISBN 978-1-42-155702-1.
- Vol. 13 (ch. 60–65): ロザリオとバンパイア season2 13 (in Japanese). September 2013. ISBN 978-4-08-870812-6. and Alter Egos. August 2014. ISBN 978-1-42-156949-9
- Vol. 14 (ch. 66, epilogue): ロザリオとバンパイア season2 14 (in Japanese). May 2014. ISBN 978-4-08-880049-3. and Transfusion. May 2015. ISBN 978-1-42-157967-2.

=== Rosario + Vampire anime ===
==== Season 1 ====
- EP 1: "New Life and a Vampire".
- EP 2: "Succubus and a Vampire".
- EP 3: "Witchling and Vampire".
- EP 4: "Farewell and Vampire".
- EP 5: "School Swimsuits and a Vampire".
- EP 6: "Newspaper Club and a Vampire".
- EP 7: "Snow Girl and a Vampire".
- EP 8: "Math and a Vampire".
- EP 9: "Summer Break and a Vampire".
- EP 10: "Sunflowers and a Vampire".
- EP 11: "New Term and a Vampire".
- EP 12: "Security Committee and a Vampire".
- EP 13: "Tsukune and a Vampire".

==== Season 2 ====
- EP 1: "Reunion and a Vampire".
- EP 2: "Little Sister and a Vampire".
- EP 3: "Mother and Child and a Vampire".
- EP 4: "Body Measurements and a Vampire".
- EP 5: "Curry and a Vampire".
- EP 6: "School Trip and a Vampire".
- EP 7: "Bathroom and a Vampire".
- EP 8: "Youth and a Vampire".
- EP 9: "Skiing and a Vampire".
- EP 10: "Pretty Boy and a Vampire".
- EP 11: "Lilith's Mirror and a Vampire".
- EP 12: "Seal and a Vampire".
- EP 13: "†Rosario and Family and a Vampire".
