= The New York Times Manga Best Sellers of 2010 =

A total of 38 manga titles, one light novel title, and one fan book title made their first appearances in 2010. Black Butler, Hetalia: Axis Powers, and Rosario + Vampire: Season II were the only three titles to reach the top rank on the week of their series debut. In this first full year of the Best Seller list, 15 titles reached the top of the weekly list (in order of number of weeks at the top of the list, from highest to lowest): Naruto, 19 weeks; Bleach, 4 weeks; Negima!, 4 weeks; Rosario + Vampire: Season II, 4 weeks; Vampire Knight, 4 weeks; Black Bird, 2 weeks; Black Butler, 2 weeks; Fullmetal Alchemist, 2 weeks; Hetalia: Axis Powers, 2 weeks; Maximum Ride, 2 weeks; Warriors: Ravenpaw's Path, 2 weeks; Yu-Gi-Oh! GX, 2 weeks; Alice in the Country of Hearts, 1 week; Tsubasa: Reservoir Chronicle, 1 week; and Ouran High School Host Club, 1 week.

Black Butler was the first release published by Yen Press to reach the top rank. Gustines observed that the week 45 releases of Bakuman, D.Gray-man, and Otomen demonstrated the diversity of the Viz Media's publishing line. Bakuman features a slice of life story, D.Gray-man contains demon-slaying, while Otomen is a romance series. Viz Media also introduced an aggressive release schedule for One Piece in 2010, releasing five volumes per month between January and June to bring the volume count of the English release from 24 to 53. On two separate occasions, five One Piece volumes (39–43 in week 15 and 44–48 in week 19) debuted on the Best Seller list simultaneously. Week 19 was also the first time a Naruto release did not appear in the top ten rankings.

Week	Sales rank^{[Legend]}										Refs.
Week	1	2	3	4	5	6	7	8	9	10	Refs.
1	Vampire Knight, vol. 8	Naruto, vol. 46	Maximum Ride, vol. 1	Vampire Knight, vol. 7	Maximum Ride, vol. 2	Soul Eater, vol. 1	Bleach, vol. 29	Black Bird, vol. 2	Death Note, L: Change the World^{[LN]}	Death Note, vol. 1	
2	Yu-Gi-Oh! GX, vol. 4	Vampire Knight, vol. 8	Naruto, vol. 46	Maximum Ride, vol. 2	Vampire Knight, vol. 7	Bleach, vol. 29	Maximum Ride, vol. 1	Fullmetal Alchemist, vol. 21	Soul Eater, vol. 1	One Piece, vol. 25	
3	Yu-Gi-Oh! GX, vol. 4	Naruto, vol. 46	Vampire Knight, vol. 8	Fullmetal Alchemist, vol. 22	Maximum Ride, vol. 2	One Piece, vol. 24	Vampire Knight, vol. 1	Maximum Ride, vol. 1	One Piece, vol. 25	Bleach, vol. 29	
4	Fullmetal Alchemist, vol. 22	Yu-Gi-Oh! GX, vol. 4	Naruto, vol. 46	Vampire Knight, vol. 1	Maximum Ride, vol. 1	Vampire Knight, vol. 7	Death Note, vol. 1	Maximum Ride, vol. 2	Vampire Knight, vol. 8	One Piece, vol. 24	
5	Black Butler, vol. 1	Tsubasa: Reservoir Chronicle, vol. 25	Fullmetal Alchemist, vol. 22	Yu-Gi-Oh! GX, vol. 4	Shugo Chara!, vol. 8	Naruto, vol. 46	Maximum Ride, vol. 2	Maximum Ride, vol. 1	One Piece, vol. 24	Vampire Knight, vol. 8	
6	Naruto, vol. 47	Vampire Knight, vol. 9	Black Bird, vol. 3	Black Butler, vol. 1	Yu-Gi-Oh! R, vol. 3	D.Gray-man, vol. 16	Yu-Gi-Oh! GX, vol. 4	Fullmetal Alchemist, vol. 22	Alice in the Country of Hearts, vol. 1	Otomen, vol. 5	
7	Naruto, vol. 47	Vampire Knight, vol. 9	Black Bird, vol. 3	Black Butler, vol. 1	Alice in the Country of Hearts, vol. 1	Yu-Gi-Oh! R, vol. 3	Fullmetal Alchemist, vol. 22	Naruto, vol. 46	D.Gray-man, vol. 16	Yu-Gi-Oh! GX, vol. 4	
8	Naruto, vol. 47	Vampire Knight, vol. 9	Black Butler, vol. 1	Black Bird, vol. 3	Alice in the Country of Hearts, vol. 1	Fullmetal Alchemist, vol. 22	Naruto, vol. 46	D.Gray-man, vol. 16	Yu-Gi-Oh! GX, vol. 4	Yu-Gi-Oh! R, vol. 3	
9	Negima!, vol. 25	Naruto, vol. 47	Soul Eater, vol. 2	Vampire Knight, vol. 9	Black Butler, vol. 1	Black Bird, vol. 3	Alice in the Country of Hearts, vol. 1	Yu-Gi-Oh! R, vol. 3	Fullmetal Alchemist, vol. 22	Higurashi When They Cry, Curse Killing Arc vol. 2	
10	Bleach, vol. 30	Naruto, vol. 47	Negima!, vol. 25	Vampire Knight, vol. 9	The Dark-Hunters, vol. 2	Soul Eater, vol. 2	Black Butler, vol. 1	Skip Beat!, vol. 20	Alice in the Country of Hearts, vol. 1	Alice in the Country of Hearts, vol. 2	
11	Naruto, vol. 47	Bleach, vol. 30	Black Butler, vol. 1	Soul Eater, vol. 2	Negima!, vol. 25	Vampire Knight, vol. 9	Alice in the Country of Hearts, vol. 2	Alice in the Country of Hearts, vol. 1	Skip Beat!, vol. 20	Black Bird, vol. 3	
12	Naruto, vol. 47	Bleach, vol. 30	Black Butler, vol. 1	Vampire Knight, vol. 9	Soul Eater, vol. 2	Alice in the Country of Hearts, vol. 2	Alice in the Country of Hearts, vol. 1	Negima!, vol. 25	Maximum Ride, vol. 1	Skip Beat!, vol. 20	
13	Warriors: Ravenpaw's Path, vol. 2	xxxHolic, vol. 15	Naruto, vol. 47	Bleach, vol. 30	Vampire Knight, vol. 9	Fairy Tail, vol. 10	Black Butler, vol. 1	The Melancholy of Haruhi Suzumiya, vol. 5	Soul Eater, vol. 2	Alice in the Country of Hearts, vol. 2	
14	Naruto, vol. 47	Bleach, vol. 30	xxxHolic, vol. 15	Black Butler, vol. 1	Soul Eater, vol. 2	Vampire Knight, vol. 9	The Melancholy of Haruhi Suzumiya, vol. 5	Fairy Tail, vol. 10	Alice in the Country of Hearts, vol. 1	Trinity Blood, vol. 12	
15	Rosario + Vampire: Season II, vol. 1	Yu-Gi-Oh! R, vol. 4	Naruto, vol. 47	Gentlemen's Alliance, vol. 11	One Piece, vol. 40	One Piece, vol. 39	One Piece, vol. 41	One Piece, vol. 43	One Piece, vol. 42	Black Butler, vol. 1	
16	Rosario + Vampire: Season II, vol. 1	Naruto, vol. 47	Gentlemen's Alliance, vol. 11	Yu-Gi-Oh! R, vol. 4	Dogs: Bullets & Carnage, vol. 3	Black Butler, vol. 1	InuYasha, vol. 47	Vampire Knight, vol. 9	Soul Eater, vol. 2	Bleach, vol. 30	
17	Rosario + Vampire: Season II, vol. 1	Yotsuba&!, vol. 8	Naruto, vol. 47	Spice and Wolf, vol. 1	Black Butler, vol. 1	Gentlemen's Alliance, vol. 11	Yu-Gi-Oh! R, vol. 4	Nightschool, vol. 3	Alice in the Country of Hearts, vol. 1	Soul Eater, vol. 2	
18	Tsubasa: Reservoir Chronicle, vol. 26	Naruto, vol. 47	Yotsuba&!, vol. 8	Rosario + Vampire: Season II, vol. 1	Black Butler, vol. 1	Fruits Basket, Banquet^{[FB]}	Yu-Gi-Oh! R, vol. 4	Spice and Wolf, vol. 1	Nightschool, vol. 3	Soul Eater, vol. 2	
19	Black Bird, vol. 4	Otomen, vol. 6	D.Gray-man, vol. 17	One Piece, vol. 44	Yotsuba&!, vol. 8	One Piece, vol. 46	One Piece, vol. 45	Tsubasa: Reservoir Chronicle, vol. 26	One Piece, vol. 47	One Piece, vol. 48	
20	Black Bird, vol. 4	Naruto, vol. 47	D.Gray-man, vol. 17	InuYasha, vol. 48	Black Butler, vol. 1	Rosario + Vampire: Season II, vol. 1	Otomen, vol. 6	Biomega, vol. 2	Yotsuba&!, vol. 8	One Piece, vol. 46	
21	Black Butler, vol. 2	Black Bird, vol. 4	Pandora Hearts, vol. 2	Naruto, vol. 47	Black Butler, vol. 1	D.Gray-man, vol. 17	Kobato., vol. 1	Rin-ne, vol. 3	Yotsuba&!, vol. 8	Rosario + Vampire: Season II, vol. 1	
22	Negima!, vol. 26	Black Butler, vol. 2	Black Bird, vol. 4	Naruto, vol. 47	Pandora Hearts, vol. 2	Black Butler, vol. 1	Dance in the Vampire Bund, vol. 7	Kobato., vol. 1	Rosario + Vampire: Season II, vol. 1	Spice and Wolf, vol. 1	
23	Naruto, vol. 48	Vampire Knight, vol. 10	Bleach, vol. 31	Negima!, vol. 26	Black Butler, vol. 2	Yu-Gi-Oh! R, vol. 5	Hellsing, vol. 10	Alice in the Country of Hearts, vol. 3	One Piece, vol. 50	One Piece, vol. 49	
24	Naruto, vol. 48	Vampire Knight, vol. 10	Bleach, vol. 31	Hellsing, vol. 10	Black Butler, vol. 2	Yu-Gi-Oh! R, vol. 5	Alice in the Country of Hearts, vol. 3	Negima!, vol. 26	Naruto, vol. 47	Battle Angel Alita: Last Order, vol. 13	
25	Naruto, vol. 48	Vampire Knight, vol. 10	Soul Eater, vol. 3	Bleach, vol. 31	Hellsing, vol. 10	Black Butler, vol. 2	Yu-Gi-Oh! R, vol. 5	Negima!, vol. 26	Naruto, vol. 47	Alice in the Country of Hearts, vol. 3	
26	Naruto, vol. 48	Vampire Knight, vol. 10	Soul Eater, vol. 3	Bleach, vol. 31	Fairy Tail, vol. 11	Hellsing, vol. 10	Black Butler, vol. 2	Ninja Girls, vol. 3	Yu-Gi-Oh! R, vol. 5	Alice in the Country of Hearts, vol. 3	
27	Naruto, vol. 48	The Last Airbender	Vampire Knight, vol. 10	Soul Eater, vol. 3	Black Butler, vol. 2	Maid Sama!, vol. 5	Bleach, vol. 31	Hellsing, vol. 10	Naruto, vol. 47	Black Butler, vol. 1	
28	Ouran High School Host Club, vol. 14	Naruto, vol. 48	One Piece, vol. 54	The Last Airbender	Vampire Knight, vol. 10	Black Butler, vol. 2	Shaman King, vol. 29	Black Butler, vol. 1	Nana, vol. 21	Stepping on Roses, vol. 2	
29	Naruto, vol. 48	Ouran High School Host Club, vol. 14	Vampire Knight, vol. 10	Black Butler, vol. 2	Black Lagoon, vol. 9	The Last Airbender	Black Butler, vol. 1	InuYasha, vol. 50	Soul Eater, vol. 3	One Piece, vol. 54	
30	Fullmetal Alchemist, vol. 23	Naruto, vol. 48	Ouran High School Host Club, vol. 14	Vampire Knight, vol. 10	Alice in the Country of Hearts, vol. 1	Megatokyo, vol. 6	Vagabond, vol. 8 (VizBig Edition)	Naruto, vol. 47	Dragon Ball Z, vol. 8 (VizBig Edition)	Yu-Gi-Oh! R, vol. 5	
31	Negima!, vol. 27	Tsubasa: Reservoir Chronicle, vol. 27	Naruto, vol. 48	Fullmetal Alchemist, vol. 23	Shugo Chara!, vol. 9	Ouran High School Host Club, vol. 14	Vampire Knight, vol. 10	Megatokyo, vol. 6	Spice and Wolf, vol. 2	Black Butler, vol. 2	
32	Warriors: Ravenpaw's Path, vol. 3	Rosario + Vampire: Season II, vol. 2	Black Bird, vol. 5	Return to Labyrinth, vol. 4	Negima!, vol. 27	Bakuman, vol. 1	Naruto, vol. 48	D.Gray-man, vol. 18	Fullmetal Alchemist, vol. 23	Skip Beat!, vol. 21	
33	Rosario + Vampire: Season II, vol. 2	Black Bird, vol. 5	Naruto, vol. 48	Bakuman, vol. 1	Negima!, vol. 27	Fullmetal Alchemist, vol. 23	D.Gray-man, vol. 18	Skip Beat!, vol. 21	Vampire Knight, vol. 10	Black Butler, vol. 2	
34	Maximum Ride, vol. 3	Rosario + Vampire: Season II, vol. 2	Black Bird, vol. 5	Naruto, vol. 48	Negima!, vol. 27	Fullmetal Alchemist, vol. 23	Bakuman, vol. 1	D.Gray-man, vol. 18	Vampire Knight, vol. 10	Black Butler, vol. 2	
35	Maximum Ride, vol. 3	Naruto, vol. 48	Rosario + Vampire: Season II, vol. 2	Black Bird, vol. 5	Bakuman, vol. 1	Chi's Sweet Home, vol. 2	Negima!, vol. 27	D.Gray-man, vol. 18	Vampire Knight, vol. 10	Black Butler, vol. 2	
36	Bleach, vol. 32	Alice in the Country of Hearts, vol. 4	Maximum Ride, vol. 3	Junjo Romantica, vol. 12	Naruto, vol. 48	Chibi Vampire, Airmail^{[LN]}	Rosario + Vampire: Season II, vol. 2	Air Gear, vols. 15–17	Black Bird, vol. 5	Bakuman, vol. 1	
37	Bleach, vol. 32	Maximum Ride, vol. 3	Alice in the Country of Hearts, vol. 4	Butterflies, Flowers, vol. 4	Rasetsu, vol. 6	The Legend of Zelda, vol. 10	Bakuman, vol. 1	Shaman King, vol. 30	Tegami Bachi, vol. 3	Naruto, vol. 48	
38	Bleach, vol. 32	Maximum Ride, vol. 3	Alice in the Country of Hearts, vol. 4	Dogs: Bullets & Carnage, vol. 4	Naruto, vol. 48	InuYasha, vol. 52	Arata: The Legend, vol. 3	Black Bird, vol. 5	Tegami Bachi, vol. 3	Bakuman, vol. 1	
39	Hetalia: Axis Powers, vol. 1	Maximum Ride, vol. 3	Bleach, vol. 32	Alice in the Country of Hearts, vol. 4	Naruto, vol. 48	Dogs: Bullets & Carnage, vol. 4	Bakuman, vol. 1	Shakugan no Shana, vol. 6	Black Butler, vol. 2	Rosario + Vampire: Season II, vol. 2	
40	Hetalia: Axis Powers, vol. 1	Dance in the Vampire Bund, vol. 8	Berserk, vol. 34	Fairy Tail, vol. 12	Maximum Ride, vol. 3	The Dark-Hunters, vol. 3	Maid Sama!, vol. 6	Bleach, vol. 32	Deadman Wonderland, vol. 3	Warcraft: Shaman	
41	Naruto, vol. 49	Black Bird, vol. 6	Yu-Gi-Oh! GX, vol. 5	Hetalia: Axis Powers, vol. 1	One Piece, vol. 55	Dengeki Daisy, vol. 2	Maximum Ride, vol. 3	Stepping on Roses, vol. 3	Dance in the Vampire Bund, vol. 8	Berserk, vol. 34	
42	Naruto, vol. 49	Black Bird, vol. 6	Hetalia: Axis Powers, vol. 1	Yu-Gi-Oh! GX, vol. 5	Maximum Ride, vol. 3	InuYasha, vol. 53	One Piece, vol. 55	Bleach, vol. 32	Dengeki Daisy, vol. 2	Alice in the Country of Hearts, vol. 4	
43	Naruto, vol. 49	Black Bird, vol. 6	Hetalia: Axis Powers, vol. 1	Yu-Gi-Oh! GX, vol. 5	Maximum Ride, vol. 3	Chi's Sweet Home, vol. 3	Case Closed, vol. 36	Bleach, vol. 32	Alice in the Country of Hearts, vol. 4	March Story, vol. 1	
44	Negima!, vol. 28	Naruto, vol. 49	Black Butler, vol. 3	Soul Eater, vol. 4	xxxHolic, vol. 16	Pandora Hearts, vol. 3	Hetalia: Axis Powers, vol. 1	Nightschool, vol. 4	Black Bird, vol. 6	The Melancholy of Haruhi Suzumiya, vol. 7	
45	Naruto, vol. 49	Black Butler, vol. 3	Negima!, vol. 28	Bakuman, vol. 2	D.Gray-man, vol. 19	Soul Eater, vol. 4	Black Bird, vol. 6	xxxHolic, vol. 16	Hetalia: Axis Powers, vol. 1	Otomen, vol. 8	
46	Naruto, vol. 49	Black Butler, vol. 3	Bakuman, vol. 2	Negima!, vol. 28	D.Gray-man, vol. 19	Hetalia: Axis Powers, vol. 1	Alice in the Country of Hearts, vol. 5	Soul Eater, vol. 4	InuYasha, vol. 54	Black Bird, vol. 6	
47	Alice in the Country of Hearts, vol. 5	Naruto, vol. 49	Black Butler, vol. 3	Bakuman, vol. 2	Negima!, vol. 28	Hetalia: Axis Powers, vol. 1	Ninja Girls, vol. 4	Soul Eater, vol. 4	D.Gray-man, vol. 19	Black Bird, vol. 6	
48	Naruto, vol. 49	Tsubasa: Reservoir Chronicle, vol. 28	Black Butler, vol. 3	Alice in the Country of Hearts, vol. 5	Hetalia: Axis Powers, vol. 1	Bakuman, vol. 2	Negima!, vol. 28	D.Gray-man, vol. 19	Black Bird, vol. 6	Ninja Girls, vol. 4	
49	Naruto, vol. 49	Tsubasa: Reservoir Chronicle, vol. 28	Spice and Wolf, vol. 3	Hetalia: Axis Powers, vol. 1	Alice in the Country of Hearts, vol. 5	Black Butler, vol. 3	K-On!, vol. 1	Maid Sama!, vol. 7	Maximum Ride, vol. 3	Bakuman, vol. 2	
50	Vampire Knight, vol. 11	Rosario + Vampire: Season II, vol. 3	Bleach, vol. 33	Ouran High School Host Club, vol. 15	Naruto, vol. 49	Skip Beat!, vol. 22	Alice in the Country of Hearts, vol. 5	Dance in the Vampire Bund, vol. 9	Ultimo, vol. 3	Black Butler, vol. 3	
51	Vampire Knight, vol. 11	Rosario + Vampire: Season II, vol. 3	Bleach, vol. 33	Naruto, vol. 49	Ouran High School Host Club, vol. 15	Hetalia: Axis Powers, vol. 1	Dance in the Vampire Bund, vol. 9	Black Butler, vol. 3	Skip Beat!, vol. 22	InuYasha, vol. 55	
52	Vampire Knight, vol. 11	Naruto, vol. 49	Yotsuba&!, vol. 9	Rosario + Vampire: Season II, vol. 3	Bleach, vol. 33	Ouran High School Host Club, vol. 15	Black Butler, vol. 3	Hetalia: Axis Powers, vol. 1	Naruto, vol. 48	Maximum Ride, vol. 3	

Weeks are numbered according to the convention used in the United States, which labels the week containing January 1 as the first week of the year.

First appearance of a manga series title on the Best Seller list

First appearance of an individual manga release on the Best Seller list

^{FB} Fan book release

^{LN} Light novel release
