= List of Dogs: Bullets & Carnage chapters =

The cover of the first tankōbon of the Dogs: Bullets & Carnage sequel released in Japan by Shueisha on October 19, 2006, featuring Heine Rammsteiner.

The chapters of the manga series Dogs: Bullets & Carnage are written and illustrated by Shirow Miwa and have been serialized in Ultra Jump since its premiere in the magazine's July issue on June 18, 2005. The prequel Dogs: Stray Dogs Howling the Dark, often shortened Dogs, was also serialized in Ultra Jump from 2000 to 2001. The series follows Heine Rammsteiner, Badou Nails, Naoto Fuyumine, and Mihai Mihaeroff, whose pasts connect them to the dystopic underground of extreme violence and genetic manipulation and the organization that runs it.

The individual chapters are published in tankōbon by Shueisha. Dogs: Stray Dogs Howling in the Dark was released on December 10, 2001. The first volume of the Dogs: Bullets & Carnage series was released on October 19, 2006, and, as of August 20, 2014, ten volumes have been released. Every chapter in the Dogs: Bullets & Carnage series is released without a title and are given English titles in the tankōbon.

On November 19, 2008, it was announced that it was to be adapted into an anime series. The anime adaption of the prequel was released on two DVDs. The first was released with the fourth volume of Dogs: Bullets & Carnage on May 19,2009 and the second was released July 17, 2009 with a limited edition reissue of Dogs, which included new story material.

At the 2008 Comic-con International, Viz Media licensed the prequel for North American release. Dogs was released on April 14, 2009. It released the first volume on August 11, 2009, and as of June 16, 2015, ten volumes have been released.

== Volume list ==
| No. | Title | Original release date | English release date |
|---|---|---|---|
| 0 | Dogs: Prelude; Dogs: Stray Dogs Howling the Dark | December 10, 2001; 978-4-08-876252-4 | April 14, 2009; 978-1-4215-2702-4 |
001: "Weepy Old Killer"; 002: "Gun Smoker"; 003: "Blade Maiden (First Part)" (Blade Maiden (前篇)); 004: "Blade Maiden (Sequel)" (Blade Maiden (後編)) (Note: Although there is a total of six chapters, chapters three and four are both numbered three and chapters five and six are both numbered four. The chapters are distinguished through the use of First Part (前篇) and Sequel (後編) in their titles.); 005: "Stray Dogs Howling in the Dark (First Part)" (Stray Dogs Howling in the Dark (前篇)); 006: "Stray Dogs Howling in the Dark (Sequel)" (Stray Dogs Howling in the Dark (後編))
Mihai Mihaeroff returns to the city to confront his former student Ian, who killed Mihai's lover, Milena; and Ian's father, a crime boss and Mihai's former employer. Upon arrival, he meets up with Kiri, who was friends with Mihai, Milena and Ian. While Mihai prepares himself overnight at the Buon Viaggio (Kiri's new restaurant), Ian learns of Mihai's presence. The two meet at Milena's grave, just as an assassin targeting Ian shoots him. The assassin wounds Ian and Mihai, who both kill him. Before he dies with Mihai and Kiri by his side, Ian admits he killed Milena because he did not want to lose Mihai, who he saw as "more of a father than my real father was"; and Mihai admits he was afraid of losing Ian. Sometime later, a boy (apparently bribed by the late assassin) purposefully runs into Mihai, reopening his wounds. Recovering in a back alley, he says: "It's not my time to die. Right, Milena? Right...Ian?" "Hard-boiled" information broker Badou Nails takes an incriminating photo of masochistic crime boss Domino Bourdone. Before hitmen kill Badou, Mihai saves him. When Bourdone learns of Badou's escape and Mihai's involvement, he mobilizes a large force and surrounds the Buon Viaggio, demanding the "secret file" back; Badou, however, cannot negotiate, as the camera was destroyed earlier by said hitmen. Shortly after, Badou runs of out nicotine, and single-handedly defeats Bourdone's men in a berserker rage, much to the surprise of Mihai and Mimi, one of Badou's colleagues. Instead of killing Bourdone, however, he asks for a cigarette. As a result of these events, the Bourdone family's reputation is destroyed. A couple and their daughter is attacked by a sword-wielding assailant. The daughter of the dead couple is taken in by the swordsman Fuyumine, who teaches her swordsmanship. However, she feels no gratefulness and lives to kill Fuyumine, believing him to be the one who killed her parents. After her attempt on his life, Fuyumine names her "Naoto", as she cannot remember her name. Years later, in Dogs's present, Naoto finds that Magato, another Fuyumine took in, has killed the man instead. Enraged, Naoto attacks and defeats Magato, who tells her that a "Naoto down below" is her parents' true killer. She sets out to find the original Naoto using Fuyumine's katana. Heine Rammsteiner rescues a young, winged girl from possible prostitution. Melvin Scrooge, the brothel owner who is after the girl, kidnaps her from Heine's motel room. He also shoots Heine, supposedly killing him. Heine recovers shortly after, and takes Badou along to attack the brothel. Badou attacks anyone he finds in the building upon running out of nicotine. In the disturbance, the girl escapes. Scrooge goes after her, encountering Heine. Even with fatal wounds, Heine kills Scrooge, and takes the girl with him to Bishop's church, where she is given a Gothic Lolita-style dress. Heine learns that the girl, called Nill, does not cause an emotional breakdown upon contact with (on account of his abnormal gynophobia).

| No. | Original release date | Original ISBN | English release date | English ISBN |
|---|---|---|---|---|
| 1 | October 19, 2006 | 978-4-08-877076-5 | August 11, 2009 | 978-1-4215-2703-1 |
001: "Whitehair & Eyepatch"; 002: "Maiden & Eisen"; 003: "Wounded & Flawless"; 004: "Smack & Down"; 005: "Blade & Bullet"; 006: "Cowardly & Proud"; 007: "Servant & Strayer I"; 008: "Servant & Strayer II"; 009: "Servant & Strayer III"; 010: "Servant & Strayer IV"; 011: "Servant & Strayer V"
Heine and Badou assault a brothel as a job from Bishop, with Heine healing quickly from a gunshot. They are given an overtime pay for rescuing young girls with animal features, much like Nill. This leads her to Heine and Badou, the former of whom gets kidnapped by a crime family. The crime boss threatens to turn Nill into a prostitute unless Heine joins his group. Meanwhile, men from the crime group attack Bishop's church, where he, Nill, and Naoto are located; their arrival leads Naoto to defend Nill. Heine is taken over by "the Dog", ripping off part of the boss's cheek with his own teeth. He then proceeds to attack the other gang members, allowing the wounded crime leader to escape. Before Heine can go after the car, Giovanni Rammsteiner appears, shooting him in the stomach. Two of Giovanni's "siblings", Luki and Noki, go after the crime boss on Giovanni's direction.
| 2 | August 17, 2007 | 978-4-08-877076-5 | December 8, 2009 | 978-1-4215-2704-8 |
012: "Grudge & Regret"; 013: "Silver & Steel I"; 014: "Silver & Steel II"; 015: "Pink & Black I"; 016: "Pink & Black II"; 017: "Pink & Black III"; 018: "Pink & Black IV"; 019: "Pink & Black V"; 020: "Pink & Black VI"; Extra: "Hardcore Twins"
| 3 | June 19, 2008 | 978-4-08-877076-5 | April 13, 2010 | 978-1-42-152781-9 |
021: "Darkness & Troopers I"; 022: "Darkness & Troopers II"; 023: "Darkness & Troopers III"; 024: "Mangler & Prodigy I"; 025: "Mangler & Prodigy II"; 026: "Blind bishop & Strongest elder"; 027: "N & N"; 028: "R & R"
| 4 | May 19, 2009 | 978-4-08-877656-9 | September 14, 2010 | 978-1-42-153435-0 |
029. "Clutter & Foreboding I"; 030. "Clutter & Foreboding II"; 031. "Clutter & Foreboding III"; 032. "Cigarette & Bad boy"; 033. "Good day & Good die"; 034. "Envy & Curse"; 035. "Armored train & Conductor I"; 036. "Armored train & Conductor II"; 037. "Armored train & Conductor III"
| 5 | March 19, 2010 | 978-4-08-877834-1 | March 8, 2011 | 978-1421538778 |
038. "Agressors & Strugglers I"; 039. "Agressors & Strugglers II"; 040. "Agressors & Strugglers III"; 041. "Agressors & Strugglers IV"; 042. "Agressors & Strugglers V"; 043. "Agressors & Strugglers VI"; 044. "Agressors & Strugglers VII"; 045. "Chevalier & Bogeyman I"; 046. "Chevalier & Bogeyman II"; 047. "Corps & Corpses"
| 6 | February 18, 2011 | 978-4-08-879111-1 | November 8, 2011 | 978-1421541723 |
048. "Chaos & Netherworld I"; 049. "Chaos & Netherworld II"; 050. "Monarch & Trickster I"; 051. "Monarch & Trickster II"; 052. "Cage & Puppies I"; 053. "Cage & Puppies II"; 054. "Cage & Puppies III"; 055. "Cage & Puppies IV"; 056. "Cage & Puppies V"; 057. "Cage & Puppies VI"
| 7 | January 19, 2012 | 978-4-08-879263-7 | December 18, 2012 | 978-1421549187 |
058. "Naoto & Magato I"; 059. "Naoto & Magato II"; 060. "His past & Principle"; 061. "Sister & Sister I"; 062. "Sister & Sister II"; 063. "Cave & Terror I"; 064. "Cave & Terror II"; 065. "Prisoner & Usurper"; 066. "Stray dog & Wild dog I"; 067. "Stray dog & Wild dog II"
| 8 | December 19, 2012 | 978-4-08-879464-8 | November 19, 2013 | 978-1421559063 |
068. "Mother & Mother I"; 069. "Mother & Mother II"; 070. "Mother & Mother III"; 071. "Haine & Naoto I"; 072. "Haine & Naoto II"; 073. "Confession & Condemnation I"; 074. "Confession & Condemnation II"; 075. "Confession & Condemnation III"; 076. "Faithful Dogs & Stray Dogs"
| 9 | December 19, 2013 | 978-4-08-879686-4 | Decebember 16, 2014 | 978-1421576756 |
077. "Ruffians & Crooks"; 078. "Outcast & Miscast I"; 079. "Outcast & Miscast II"; 080. "Big Moles & Hounds"; 081. "Dark Road & Perdition"; 082. "Jet Black & Shocking Pink I"; 083. "Jet Black & Shocking Pink II"; 084. "Strayer & Pied Piper I"; 085. "Strayer & Pied Piper II
| 10 | August 20, 2014 | 978-4-08-879686-4 | June 16, 2015 | 978-1421580357 |
086. "Queens & Hounds I"; 087. "Queens & Hounds II"; 088. "Queens & Hounds III"; 089. "Sister & Bothers I"; 090. "Sister & Bothers II"; 091. "Sister & Sisters I"; 092. "Sister & Sisters II"; 093. "Flesh & Crash"; 094. "Fall & Damnation"

== Chapters not yet in tankōbon format ==
These chapters have yet to be published in a tankōbon volume.

- 95–101
