= List of Black Lagoon chapters =

Cover of the first tankōbon volume

The chapters of the Japanese manga series Black Lagoon are written and illustrated by Rei Hiroe and published in Shogakukan's seinen manga magazine Monthly Sunday Gene-X since April 19, 2002. As of August 19, 2026, fourteen tankōbon volumes have been released.

The in North American English-language release of the manga is controlled by Viz Media, who published the first volume on August 12, 2008.

A spin-off about Sawyer, titled Black Lagoon: Sōjiya Sawyer – Kaitai! Gore Gore Musume (BLACK LAGOON 掃除屋ソーヤー 解体！ゴアゴア娘; lit. "Black Lagoon: Sawyer the Cleaner - Dismemberment! Gore Gore Girl"), illustrated by Tatsuhiko Ida, began in Monthly Sunday Gene-X on September 19, 2019.

A spin-off about Eda, titled Black Lagoon Eda: Initial Stage, illustrated by Hajime Yamamura, started in Monthly Sunday Gene-X on April 19, 2022.

== Volumes ==
No.	Original release date	Original ISBN	English release date	English ISBN
1	December 12, 2002	978-4-09-157201-1	August 12, 2008	978-1-4215-1382-9
00: "Black Lagoon"; 01: "Ring-Ding Ship Chase"; 02: "Rasta Blasta – Part 1"; 03: "Rasta Blasta – Part 2"; 04: "Rasta Blasta – Part 3"; Omake: "~The High School Episode~"; "The Wondrously Captivating Roberta by Rei Hiroe, 3rd Grade, Ms. Basinger"
2	July 19, 2003	978-4-09-157202-8	October 14, 2008	978-1-4215-1891-6
05: "Das Wieder Erstehen Des Adlers/Die Rückkehr des Adlers – Part 1" [a.k.a. The Recapture/Return of the Eagle]; 06: "Das Wieder Erstehen Des Adlers/Die Rückkehr des Adlers – Part 2" [a.k.a. The Recapture/Return of the Eagle]; 07: "Das Wieder Erstehen Des Adlers/Die Rückkehr des Adlers – Part 3" [a.k.a. The Recapture/Return of the Eagle]; 08: "Das Wieder Erstehen Des Adlers/Die Rückkehr des Adlers – Part 4" [a.k.a. The Recapture/Return of the Eagle]; 09: "Calm Down, Two Men – Part 1"; 10: "Calm Down, Two Men – Part 2"; 11: "Bloodsport Fairy Tale – Part 1"; 12: "Bloodsport Fairy Tale – Part 2"; Omake: "The Magical Girl Episode"
3	April 19, 2004	978-4-09-157203-5	December 9, 2008	978-1-4215-1892-3
13: "Bloodsport Fairy Tale – Part 3"; 14: "Bloodsport Fairy Tale – Part 4"; 15: "Bloodsport Fairy Tale – Part 5"; 16: "Goat, Jihad, Rock'n Roll – Part 1"; 17: "Goat, Jihad, Rock'n Roll – Part 2"; 18: "Goat, Jihad, Rock'n Roll – Part 3"; 19: "Goat, Jihad, Rock'n Roll – Part 4"; 20: "Goat, Jihad, Rock'n Roll – Part 5"; Omake: "The Melancholy of Balalaika"
4	July 19, 2005	978-4-09-157204-2	February 10, 2009	978-1-4215-1893-0
21: "Goat, Jihad, Rock'n Roll – Part 6"; 22: "Fujiyama Gangsta Paradise – Part 1"; 23: "Fujiyama Gangsta Paradise – Part 2"; 24: "Fujiyama Gangsta Paradise – Part 3"; 25: "Fujiyama Gangsta Paradise – Part 4"; 26: "Fujiyama Gangsta Paradise – Part 5"; 27: "Fujiyama Gangsta Paradise – Part 6"; 28: "Fujiyama Gangsta Paradise – Part 7"; 29: "Fujiyama Gangsta Paradise – Part 8"; Omake: "~Boys and Girls~"
5	March 17, 2006	978-4-09-157020-8	April 14, 2009	978-1-4215-1894-7
30: "Fujiyama Gangsta Paradise – Part 9"; 31: "Fujiyama Gangsta Paradise – Part 10"; 32: "Fujiyama Gangsta Paradise – Part 11"; 33: "Fujiyama Gangsta Paradise – Part 12"; 34: "Fujiyama Gangsta Paradise – Part 13"; 35: "Fujiyama Gangsta Paradise – Part 14"; 36: "Fujiyama Gangsta Paradise – Part 15"; 37: "Fujiyama Gangsta Paradise – Part 16"; Omake: "~Go For It! Manzai Grad Prix!~"
6	November 11, 2006	978-4-09-157075-8	June 9, 2009	978-1-4215-1981-4
38: "Greenback Jane – Part 1"; 39: "Greenback Jane – Part 2"; 40: "Greenback Jane – Part 3"; 41: "Greenback Jane – Part 4"; 42: "Greenback Jane – Part 5"; 43: "Greenback Jane – Part 6"; 44: "El Baile de la Muerte – Part 1" [a.k.a. The Dance of Death]; 45: "El Baile de la Muerte – Part 2" [a.k.a. The Dance of Death]; 46: "El Baile de la Muerte – Part 3" [a.k.a. The Dance of Death]; Omake: "~Summer Evening Spooky Story Contest~"
7	October 10, 2007	978-4-09-157113-7	August 11, 2009	978-1-4215-2456-6
47: "El Baile de la Muerte – Part 4" [a.k.a. The Dance of Death]; 48: "El Baile de la Muerte – Part 5" [a.k.a. The Dance of Death]; 49: "El Baile de la Muerte – Part 6" [a.k.a. The Dance of Death]; 50: "El Baile de la Muerte – Part 7" [a.k.a. The Dance of Death]; 51: "El Baile de la Muerte – Part 8" [a.k.a. The Dance of Death]; 52: "El Baile de la Muerte – Part 9" [a.k.a. The Dance of Death]; 53: "El Baile de la Muerte – Part 10" [a.k.a. The Dance of Death]; 54: "El Baile de la Muerte – Part 11" [a.k.a. The Dance of Death]; 55: "El Baile de la Muerte – Part 12" [a.k.a. The Dance of Death]; Omake: "~Viva! Youth!~"
8	July 19, 2008	978-4-09-157140-3	October 13, 2009	978-1-4215-2779-6
56: "El Baile de la Muerte – Part 13" [a.k.a. The Dance of Death]; 57: "El Baile de la Muerte – Part 14" [a.k.a. The Dance of Death]; 58: "El Baile de la Muerte – Part 15" [a.k.a. The Dance of Death]; 59: "El Baile de la Muerte – Part 16" [a.k.a. The Dance of Death]; 60: "El Baile de la Muerte – Part 17" [a.k.a. The Dance of Death]; 61: "El Baile de la Muerte – Part 18" [a.k.a. The Dance of Death]; 62: "El Baile de la Muerte – Part 19" [a.k.a. The Dance of Death]; 63: "El Baile de la Muerte – Part 20" [a.k.a. The Dance of Death]; 64: "El Baile de la Muerte – Part 21" [a.k.a. The Dance of Death]
9	October 19, 2009	978-4-09-157189-2	July 13, 2010	978-1-4215-3629-3
65: "El Baile de la Muerte – Part 22" [a.k.a. The Dance of Death]; 66: "El Baile de la Muerte – Part 23" [a.k.a. The Dance of Death]; 67: "El Baile de la Muerte – Part 24" [a.k.a. The Dance of Death]; 68: "El Baile de la Muerte – Part 25" [a.k.a. The Dance of Death]; 69: "El Baile de la Muerte – Part 26" [a.k.a. The Dance of Death]; 70: "El Baile de la Muerte – Part 27" [a.k.a. The Dance of Death]; 71: "El Baile de la Muerte – Part 28" [a.k.a. The Dance of Death]; 72: "El Baile de la Muerte – Part 29" [a.k.a. The Dance of Death]; 73: "El Baile de la Muerte – Part 30" [a.k.a. The Dance of Death]; 74: "El Baile de la Muerte – Part 31" [a.k.a. The Dance of Death]; 75: "El Baile de la Muerte – Part 32" [a.k.a. The Dance of Death]; 76: "El Baile de la Muerte – Part 33" [a.k.a. The Dance of Death]; "Epilogue"; Omake: "[Revenge, Who Does It Belong To?]"
10	May 19, 2014; May 16, 2014 (LE)	978-4-09-157375-9; 978-4-09-941831-1 (LE)	April 7, 2015	978-1-4215-7772-2
77: "The Wired Red Wild Card – Part 1"; 78: "The Wired Red Wild Card – Part 2"; 79: "The Wired Red Wild Card – Part 3"; 80: "The Wired Red Wild Card – Part 4"; 81: "The Wired Red Wild Card – Part 5"; 82: "The Wired Red Wild Card – Part 6"; 83: "The Wired Red Wild Card – Part 7"; 84: "The Wired Red Wild Card – Part 8"; 85: "The Wired Red Wild Card – Part 9"; 86: "The Wired Red Wild Card – Part 10"; 87: "The Wired Red Wild Card – Part 11"; Omake: "Black Lagoon: The Story · Do You Remember?"; Note: In the collected volume, "The Wired Red Wild Card" is listed as a single chapter (numbered as Chapter 77).
11	November 24, 2018; November 19, 2018 (LE)	978-4-09-157551-7; 978-4-09-943031-3 (LE)	January 21, 2020	978-1-9747-1119-2
88: "The Wired Red Wild Card – Part 12"; 89: "The Wired Red Wild Card – Part 13"; 90: "The Wired Red Wild Card – Part 14"; 91: "The Wired Red Wild Card – Part 15"; 92: "The Wired Red Wild Card – Part 16"; 93: "The Wired Red Wild Card – Part 17"; 94: "The Wired Red Wild Card – Part 18"; 95: "The Wired Red Wild Card – Part 19"; 96: "The Wired Red Wild Card – Part 20"; 97: "The Wired Red Wild Card – Part 21"; 98: "The Wired Red Wild Card – Part 22"; 99: "The Wired Red Wild Card – Part 23"; 100: "The Wired Red Wild Card – Part 24"; 101: "The Wired Red Wild Card – Part 25"; Omake: "Black Lagoon: Eyeglasses are a part of your face?"; Note: In the collected volume, "The Wired Red Wild Card" is listed as a single chapter (numbered as Chapter 77).
12	August 19, 2021	978-4-09-157646-0	August 16, 2022	978-1-9747-3209-8
102: "L'homme sombre – Part 1" [a.k.a. The Dark Man]; 103: "L'homme sombre – Part 2" [a.k.a. The Dark Man]; 104: "L'homme sombre – Part 3" [a.k.a. The Dark Man]; 105: "L'homme sombre – Part 4" [a.k.a. The Dark Man]; 106: "L'homme sombre – Part 5" [a.k.a. The Dark Man]; 107: "L'homme sombre – Part 6" [a.k.a. The Dark Man]; 108: "L'homme sombre – Part 7" [a.k.a. The Dark Man]; 109: "L'homme sombre – Part 8" [a.k.a. The Dark Man]; Note: In the collected volume, chapters 102–109 were numbered as chapters 78–85. Chapters 103 and the first six pages of Chapter 104 was combined as Chapter 79 (Part 2), and the rest of Chapter 104 and Chapter 105 was combined as Chapter 80 (Part 3). Due to this, volume part renumbering has been changed to Parts 1–7.
13	December 19, 2023	978-4-09-157790-0	December 17, 2024	978-1-9747-4981-2
110: "L'homme sombre – Part 9" [a.k.a. The Dark Man]; 111: "L'homme sombre – Part 10" [a.k.a. The Dark Man]; 112: "L'homme sombre – Part 11" [a.k.a. The Dark Man]; 113: "L'homme sombre – Part 12" [a.k.a. The Dark Man]; 114: "New Girl in the Hood – Part 1"; 115: "New Girl in the Hood – Part 2"; 116: "Where the Chips Fall"; Note: In the collected volume, Chapters 111–116 were numbered as Chapters 86–91. Due to Volume 12 combining and renumbering chapters, "L'homme sombre" Parts 9–12 are renumbered as Parts 8–11.
14	August 19, 2026	978-4-09-157790-0	-	—
117: "El Réquiem de los Desalmados – Part 1"; 118: "El Réquiem de los Desalmados – Part 2"; 119: "El Réquiem de los Desalmados – Part 3"; 120: "El Réquiem de los Desalmados – Part 4"; 121: "El Réquiem de los Desalmados – Part 5"; 122: "El Réquiem de los Desalmados – Part 6"; Note: In the collected volume, Chapters 117–122 were numbered as Chapters 92–97.

== Sōjiya Sawyer – Kaitai! Gore Gore Musume ==
No.	Japanese release date	Japanese ISBN
1	July 17, 2020	978-4-09-157603-3
01: "In the Mouth of Madness"; 02: "The Shadow Over Roanapur"; 03: "Stand by Me"; 04: "Soap Opera"; 05: "A Quiet Place"; 06: "Spring Heeled Jack"; 07: "The Rats in the Walls"
2	December 18, 2020	978-4-09-157616-3
08: "Chill Out"; 09: "Basket Case" a.k.a. "Quiet Room"; 10: "Children Shouldn't Play with Dead Things"; 11: "Ghost Dog"; 12: "The Fog"; 13: "Signs"; 14: "Gloomy Sunday"
3	August 19, 2021	978-4-09-157647-7
15: "Delicatessen"; 16: "Dressed to Kill"; 17: "Enter the Fat Dragon"; 18: "Grave Encounters"; 19: "Light My Fire"; 20: "In-A-Gadda-Da-Vida"; 21: "The Lure"
4	February 18, 2022	978-4-09-157670-5
22: "Iron Maiden"; 23: "A Mad Tea-Party"; 24: "Cursed"; 25: "Looper"; 26: "Trash House"; 27: "Deep Blue Sea"; 28: "The Ring"
5	September 16, 2022	978-4-09-157688-0
29: "Big Trouble in Little China"; 30: "Fallen Angel"; 31: "Swamp Thing"; 32: "The Asylum"; 33: "I Spit on Your Grave"; 34: "Nosferatu"; 35: "Stranger Things"
6	March 17, 2023	978-4-09-157746-7
36: "The Hangover"; 37: "Someone to Watch Over Me"; 38: "Vengeance"; 39: "Fetish"; 40: "Copycat"; 41: "The Wraith"; 42: "The Island"
7	December 19, 2023	978-4-09-157787-0
43: "Ghost Ship – Part 1"; 44: "Ghost Ship – Part 2"; 45: "Chain Reaction"; 46: "Haute Tension"; 47: "Wicker Man"; 48: "Collateral"; 49: "The Name of the Rose"
8	May 17, 2024	978-4-09-157824-2
50: "Wasabi"; 51: "Nightmare Before Christmas"; 52: "Clown"; 53: "The Brides of Dracula"; 54: "The Twilight Zone"; 55: "Bachelor Party"; 56: "Twilight"
9	January 17, 2025	978-4-09-157853-2
57: "Love Me Tender"; 58: "Saw"; 59: "Eaten Alive"; 60: "Catacomb"; 61: "Faster, Pussycat! Kill! Kill!"; 62: "What's New Pussycat?"; 63: "No Country for Old Men"
10	September 19, 2025	978-4-09-157893-8
64: "Doctor Who"; 65: "Videodrome"; 66: "The Duellists"; 67: "Rough Night"; 68: "Scarface vs. the Texas Chain Saw Massacre"; 69: "The Witch"; 70: "Trigger Effect"
11	May 19, 2026	978-4-09-158225-6
71: "Faust"; 72: "Maniac Cop"; 73: "Hard Target"; 74: "Ssssnake"; 75: "Die Hard"; 76: "London Has Fallen"; 77: "Under Siege"; 78: "The Man Who Stole the Sun"

=== Chapters not yet in tankōbon format ===
- 79: "The Untold Story"
- 80: "Desperado"
- 81: "Unbreakable"
- 82: "Zombie"

== Eda: Initial Stage ==
No.	Japanese release date	Japanese ISBN
1	September 16, 2022	978-4-09-157690-3
01: "Devastating New Face – Part 1"; 02: "Devastating New Face – Part 2"; 03: "Miami Vice – Part 1"; 04: "Miami Vice – Part 2"; 05: "Miami Vice – Part 3"
2	March 17, 2023	978-4-09-157747-4
06: "Wandering Old Case Officer – Part 1"; 07: "Wandering Old Case Officer – Part 2"; 08: "Balkan Crisis – Part 1"; 09: "Balkan Crisis – Part 2"; 10: "Balkan Crisis – Part 3"; 11: "Balkan Crisis – Part 4"
3	December 19, 2023	978-4-09-157788-7
12: "A Savage Place – Part 1"; 13: "A Savage Place – Part 2"; 14: "A Savage Place – Part 3"; 15: "A Savage Place – Part 4"; 16: "The Spy Who Came in from Cold – Part 1"; 17: "The Spy Who Came in from Cold – Part 2"
4	May 17, 2024	978-4-09-157825-9
18: "The Spy Who Came in from Cold – Part 3"; 19: "The Spy Who Came in from Cold – Part 4"; 20: "The Spy Who Came in from Cold – Part 5"; 21: "Little King of the South – Part 1"; 22: "Little King of the South – Part 2"; 23: "Little King of the South – Part 3"
5	September 19, 2024	978-4-09-157838-9
24: "Little King of the South – Part 4"; 25: "Little King of the South – Part 5"; 26: "Little King of the South – Part 6"; 27: "Little King of the South – Part 7"; 28: "Little King of the South – Part 8"; 29: "Little King of the South – Part 9"
6	February 16, 2025	978-4-09-157876-1
30: "Groovy Guy Russell – Part 1"; 31: "Groovy Guy Russell – Part 2"; 32: "Our Day Will Come – Part 1"; 33: "Our Day Will Come – Part 2"; 34: "Our Day Will Come – Part 3"
7	September 19, 2025	978-4-09-157892-1
35: "Irishman in N.Y. – Part 1"; 36: "Irishman in N.Y. – Part 2"; 37: "Irishman in N.Y. – Part 3"; 38: "Irishman in N.Y. – Part 4"; 39: "Man on Fire – Part 1"
8	March 18, 2026	978-4-09-158219-5
40: "Man on Fire – Part 2"; 41: "Man on Fire – Part 3"; 42: "Man on Fire – Part 4"; 43: "Man on Fire – Part 5"; 44: "Suspected Colleague – Part 1"

=== Chapters not yet in tankōbon format ===
- 45: "Suspected Colleague - Part 2"
- 46: "Honey Trap – Part 1"
- 47: "Honey Trap – Part 2"
- 48: "Honey Trap – Part 3"
- 49: "Finlandia – Part 1"
- 50: "Finlandia – Part 2"
- 51: "Finlandia – Part 3"
