= List of Chibi Vampire: The Novel light novels =

First volume of the English adaptation of Chibi Vampire: The Novel, released by Tokyopop on January 9, 2007

The light novel series Chibi Vampire: The Novel is based on the Chibi Vampire manga series written by Yuna Kagesaki. Written by Tohru Kai with illustrations provided by Kagesaki, the novels follow the adventures of Karin, a vampire who gives blood instead of taking it, and Kenta, a classmate who learns her secret and becomes her daytime help, as they get tangled up in various mysteries. The novels are published by Fujimi Shobo, with the first volume released on December 10, 2003, and the final in April 2008.

Tokyopop, which also licensed the manga series, acquired the license to release the novels in English in North America. As the company had renamed the manga series from Karin to Chibi Vampire, it released the novel series under the name Chibi Vampire: The Novel. The first English volume was released on January 9, 2007. In June 2008, Tokyopop restructured itself, breaking into two subsidiaries under a single holding company, and cut its publication releases by more than half. As part of this cut back, Tokyopop canceled the remaining releases of Chibi Vampire: The Novel after the fifth volume, due to be released July 8, 2008. The company later reversed the cancellation and announced that volume six would be released April 13, 2010.

Chibi Vampire: The Novel is closely tied to the manga series, with each novel volume designed to be read after its corresponding manga volume. For example, the first novel takes place between the events that occur in the first and second volumes of the manga series, and the fourth volume of the manga mentions characters and events from the first novel volume.

== Volume list ==
=== Chibi Vampire: The Novel ===
No.	Original release date	Original ISBN	English release date	English ISBN
1	December 10, 2003	4-8291-6228-7	January 9, 2007	978-1-59816-922-5
Prologue; 1. The Blood Injector is Frequently Embarrassed; 2. The Blood Injector is Accused Unjustly; 3. The Blood Injector Has Much to Worry About; 4. The Blood Injector is in Very Big Trouble; 5. The Blood Injector is a Goddess of Fortune; Epilogue; Postscript
2	March 10, 2004	4-8291-6250-3	May 8, 2007	978-1-59816-923-2
Prologue; 1. Chibi Vampire and the Novice Sister; 2. Chibi Vampire and the Horn Dog; 3. A Pile of Misunderstanding; 4. Chibi Vampire and the Arsonist's Identity; 5. Chibi Vampire and the Mysterious Abandoned Building; 6. Chibi Vampire and the Savior; 7. Chibi Vampire and the Farewell Visit; Epilogue; Postscript
3	August 7, 2004	4-8291-6266-X	September 11, 2007	978-1-59816-924-9
Prologue; 1. Chibi Vampire and the Extra Job; 2. Chibi Vampire and the Embarrassing Bikini; 3. Chibi Vampire and the Unfortunate Eavesdropping; 4. Chibi Vampire's Isolation and Suspicion; 5. Chibi Vampire's Double Trouble; Epilogue; Postscript
4	December 10, 2004	4-8291-6280-5	January 8, 2008	978-1-59816-925-6
Prologue; 1. Chibi Vampire Meets Someone New; 2. Chibi Vampire and Anju's Scheme; 3. Chibi Vampire Most Dangerous Day; 4. Chibi Vampire and Kenta's Fury; 5. Chibi Vampire and the Lingering Emotions; Epilogue; Postscript
5	April 9, 2005	4-8291-6298-8	July 8, 2008	978-1-59816-926-3
Prologue; 1. Meet Chibi Vampire's Rival; 2. Chibi Vampire is Forcibly Evicted; 3. Chibi Vampire the Illegal Immigrant?; 4. Chibi Vampire and Kenta in Peril; 5. Chibi Vampire and the Limit of Endurance; Epilogue; Postscript
6	October 8, 2005	4-8291-6321-6	April 13, 2010.	978-1-59816-927-0
Prologue; 1. The Blood-Injector and Henry's Secret Child; 2. The Blood-Injector and Kenta's Jealousy; 3. The Blood-Injector and the Truth about Jake; 4. The Blood-Injector and the Meaning of Injection; Epilogue; Postscript
7	September 9, 2006	4-8291-6368-2	October 12, 2010	1-4278-0198-3
Prologue; 1. Chibi Vampire and the Outcast Vampire; 2. Chibi Vampire and the Idiot Lovebirds Contest; 3. Chibi Vampire and the Ring That Wouldn't Come Off; 4. Chibi Vampire and Female Friendship; Epilogue; Postscript
8	February 10, 2007	978-4-8291-6383-2	March 1, 2011	1-4278-0681-0
Prologue; 1. Chibi Vampire and an Occult Researcher; 2. Chibi Vampire and Noel's Plot; 3. Chibi Vampire and Kenta's Apathy; 4. Chibi Vampire and Anju's Decision; Afterword
Part one of two. Kenta gets hypnotized into thinking that vampires are the enemy of all mankind.
9	May 10, 2007	978-4-8291-6389-4	Announced for September 11, 2011, but never happened.	1-4278-0826-0
Completion of story started in book eight.

=== Shyness Diary ===
No.	Release date	ISBN
1	February 10, 2006	4-8291-6339-9
2	May 10, 2006	4-8291-6350-X
