= List of Ultimo chapters =

The manga series Ultimo is created by Hiroyuki Takei and Stan Lee (and his production company Pow Entertainment). The manga is published by Shueisha in their Jump Square magazine, beginning serialization in 2009. The chapters are later collected into tankōbon bound volumes by Shueisha. The first tankōbon was released on July 3, 2009, and the fifth on November 4, 2010.

Ultimo is licensed by Viz Media for an English adaptation in North America. Viz serialized the manga in the American Shonen Jump magazine before their February 2011 issue and later releases in volumes. The first volume was released on February 2, 2010.

== Volumes list ==
No.	Title	Original release date	English release date
1	Kurenai Dôji; Kurenai Dōji Hohoasobi (紅童子 ほほ遊び)	July 3, 2009; 978-4-08-874708-8	February 2, 2010; 978-1-4215-3132-8
1. "Nanban-Okina Misty Pass" (南蠻翁霧峠, "Nanban Okina Kiri-no-Tōge"); 2. "Kurenai Dôji" (紅童子 ほほ遊び, "Kurenai Dōji Hohoasobi"); 3. "A Blaze Surrounds Yamato" (大和 身ノ周 炎上, "Yamato, Mi no Mawari: Enjō"); 4. "Raseimon Dream" (夢中羅世門, "Muchū Raseimon"); Extra: Interview with the Creators (Hiroyuki Takei and Stan Lee)
With girl and money troubles, life is hard enough for high school student Yamato, but then he stumbles upon Ultimo, a peculiar-looking puppet. Things only get stranger when Ultimo awakens and his archenemy Vice shows up. Will this be the battle that finally decides good versus evil, or is this just the beginning of a most fantastic adventure?
2	A Master on the Edge; Gake no Ue no Tono (崖ノ上ノ殿)	January 4, 2010; 978-4-08-874790-3	July 6, 2010; 978-1-4215-3819-8
5. "Violence at Moonlight Tower" (修羅月光塔, Shura Gekkō-no-Tō); 6. "Masters Meeting in Sick Ward" (殿寄合病棟, "Tono yori Aibyōtō"); 7. "Mr. Blown-to-Bits" (バスガス爆発男, "Basugasubakuhatsu Otoko"); 8. "A Master on the Edge" (崖ノ上ノ殿, "Gake no Ue no Tono"); Extra: "Karakuridôji Ultimo Ulate I" (機巧童子ULTIMO ULATE 其ノI, "Karakuridôji Urutimo Urate sono I")
Things just keep getting more complicated for Yamato since Ultimo showed up. Now Yamato and Ultimo must face new dôji and deal with people whose intentions aren't always so clear. Can Yamato find the strength to meet these challenges and solve the mysteries of the Karakuri Dôji?
3	World Annihilation	March 4, 2010; 978-4-08-870017-5	December 7, 2010; 978-1-4215-3841-9
9. "The Pledge Ritual" (契ノ儀, "Chigiri no Gi"); 10. "Perilous Pact" (あのこのこ心中, "Ano Ko no Koshinjū"); 11. "The Beginning of the End" (終ノ始, "Owari no Hajimari"); 12. "World Annihilation" (人世天滅亡, "Hitoyo Ama-no-Metsubō"); Extra: "Karakuridôji Ultimo Ulate II" (機巧童子ULTIMO ULATE 其ノII, Karakuridōji Urutimo Urate Sono Tū)
Yamato takes the pledge with Ultimo, seeing visions of his past life, things that may yet occur in the present and somethings of the future. To his shock, he sees Milieu and Dunstan, who are surprised he was able to see them. They take an ICON form of a giant dragon and scare him out of the vision. They next day at school, Hana Koganei and her evil doji Edile attack. Yamato and Ultimo combine into God Ultimo, reverting Edile back to his true tiny form and freezing the two of them in time. However, things become much worse when it is revealed Jealousy chose Rune as his new master. The two of them combine into an ICON form as well. Rune reveals that he knew Yamato in a past life as well; as his bride Lady Gecko. Rune reveals it explains why he was always so close to him and felt jealous of Yamato's affection for Sayama. Not wanting his friends to get caught in the fight, Yamato transports himself and Rune to a forest near Mt. Fuji, so they can end the fight. However, this turns out to have been a trap set by the Club of Good Doji, who render Rune unable to use his senses properly. This in turn, turns out to have been a trap within a trap, as K and Vice arrive with the Evil Doji Branch, capturing everyone. K reveals that the Evil Doji Branch plans to rule the world after culling the population to a billion people to end the problems in the world. With that, they kill all the good doji and their masters. Horrified, Yamato attempts to rewind time with all of Ultimo's power, causing a disruption in the magnetic field of Earth, beginning its destruction. Watching for nearby, Dunstan notes even his brilliance can't alter the laws of nature and the Hundred Machine Funeral has begun.
4	Karakuri New Dawn	August 4, 2010; 978-4-08-870080-9	March 1, 2011; 978-1-4215-3952-2
13. "Karakuri New Dawn" (絡繰灯篭逆巻明, "Karakuri Dōrō Sakamaki-no-Ake"); 14. "Love Wasabi" (愛山葵, "Ai Wasabi"); 15. "Battle at the Antique Shop" (骨董屋決闘, "Kottō-ya Kettō"); 16. "Time Traveler Yamato" (時飛脚大和往来, "Tokibikyaku Yamato ōrai")
Yamato wakes up on the same day he found Ultimo, thinking his memories of the Doji are just deja vu from a dream. However, Musashi transfers to his class, revealing that Ultimo and Regula used the last of their power to send their present day minds back into their "past" bodies. Musashi reveals Dunstan is a mad scientist from the 31st century, whose meddling with the fabric of reality caused his era to disappear as he chased him into the past; he also reveals that if Yamato does not awaken Ultimo, Dunstan will arrange for another reincarnate to wake him instead. Yamato decides to go wake Ultimo, finding Iruma and Jealousy talking about buying Utlimo from the shopkeeper. However, Yamato blunders and reveals himself, causing Iruma to order his execution. Jealousy attempts to kill Iruma instead, but Yamto gets in the way; his endangerment wakes Ultimo, who is happy his master remembers him. Jealousy is forced to combine into an ICON form with Iruma to keep Ultimo from taking the pledge with Yamato. However, Musashi arrives and uses Sophia's abilities to render Iruma unable to uses his senses properly. Yamato takes the pledge with Utlimo to travel back into the past to find the root of Iruma's evil in the present.
5	Yamato in Trouble	November 4, 2010; 978-4-08-870137-0	June 7, 2011; 978-1-4215-3953-9
17. "Time Traveler Yamato—Part II" (時飛脚大和往来 —其の二—, "Tokibikyaku Yamato ōrai —Sono Ni—"); 18. "Yamato Determination" (大和石固め, "Yamato Ishikatame"); 19. "Sword Demon" (タチ鬼, "Tachioni"); 20. "Koigataki: Baseball Boy's Losing Record" (恋ヶ滝 球児負越, "Koi-ga-Taki: Kyūko-no-Makekoshi")
Yamato learns that the Iruma was a well-meaning member of the government in his past life; however, he secretly felt bitterness towards the Mikado (K's past life) for driving their country into ruin over his ridiculous hobbies. He became evil after receiving Jealousy, revealing that Evil Doji can corrupt even well-meaning people into evil versions of themselves. Yamato is almost killed by Jealousy, but Dunstan and Milieu intervene, saving him; Yamato voices his anger at how Dunstan corrupts good people with the Evil Doji, but Dunstan is unaffected, instead telling Yamato that he finds the idea of trying to stop him interesting. Returning to the present, Yamato is unable to stop Jealousy from killing Iruma again; Jealousy plans to take the pledge with Yamato as his natural incompetence is sufficiently evil enough to qualify him as an Evil Doji master. However, because of Yamato's strong feelings for Sayami, Jealousy is unable to sneak into his heart to manipulate him. Instead, Jealousy makes Rune his new master for the time being. Yamato is rescued by the Club of Good Doji, who tell him to not attempt any more actions as Ultimo is weak for time travel. He visits Echo, who offers him a third option: visit all the Doji masters and try to come to an understanding over fighting. Vice attacks the abandoned hospital, killing Dr. Shinjiki, who warned the others that killing others is killing yourself. During the fight, Echo and Regula arrive in ICON form, stopping Vice long enough for Machi and Slow to escape with Hiroshi, Gauge and Pardonner. Ecco tells Vice that he will use all the strength he has left to give the reincartnated Doji masters memories of their past lives to fight him. Yamato heads for Sayama's birthday party, finding Akira Hidaka (Orgullo's master) in attendance. Rune is there as well, tricking Yamato into leaving with him by convincing him Akira is dating Sayama. Outside, Jealousy tells Orgullo that there is something warm and peaceful in Yamato's heart that even his power cannot understand.
6	The House of Awakening	March 4, 2011; 978-4-08-870202-5	September 6, 2011; 978-1-4215-4121-1
21. "Mansion of Awakening" (覚醒館, "Kakuseikan"); 22. "The Lust Rabbit's Superpimp Theory" (色欲兎 超紐理論, "Shikiyoku Usagi: Chōhimo Riron"); 23. "Whip of Love, Murderous Tongue of a Sparrow" (愛の鞭 雀の舌斬, "Ai no Muchi, Suzume no Shitakiri"); 24. "Sparrow Mahjong Club Evil Lineup Gathered" (雀荘悪覧会, "Suzume-Sō Akurankai")
Rune uses Jealousy to restrain Yamato, but Ultimo manages to save him. Yamato is picked up by the police officer who is a reincarnate of a subordinate in his past life. At the same time Desir of the Seven Deadly Sins, fights Service of the Six Perfections. Desir is unable to gain strength from his master as she doesn't selfishly desire him, but purely loves him; the fight ends in a draw. The Evil Doji Branch meets at K's place, with Paresse's master revealed to be a hardened soldier reincarnated into a frail girl. Dunstan surprises the group when he learns they plan to kill him to ensure their rule of the world; however, he disappears into the cosmos after telling them he is always watching.
7	Funeral's Eve	September 7, 2011; 978-4-08-870328-2	August 7, 2012; 978-1-4215-4263-8
25. "Festival, the Night before the Funeral" (回向前夜祭, "Ekou Zen'ya-sai"); 26. "The Resurrected Crimson Child" (復活紅童子, "Fukkatsu-no-Kurenai Dōji"); 27. "Hundred Machine Funeral, Dawn of Mysteries" (百機回向 幽玄ノ夜明, "Hyakki Ekō Yūgen no Yoake"); 28. "Hairball of War Starting Assassin" (戦始刺客乃毛鞠, "Ikusa Hajime Shikaku no Kemari")
8	Theory of Good and Evil	March 2, 2012; 978-1-4215-4263-8	January 1, 2013; 978-1421551531
29. "Angry Bull, Wise Tiger: Super Attack"; 30. "Future Tales: Inception"; 31. "Theory of Good and Evil"; 32. "Intersection of Hidden Motives"; 33. "That Daughter"
9	Absorption-Evolution Battle	December 10, 2012; 978-4-08-870598-9	November 5, 2013; 978-1-42-155884-4
34. "Smooth Wake"; 35. "Slow Deer Confession"; 36. "Super Medic Butterfly"; 37. "Underground Boar Bare-Handed"; 38. "Absorption-Evolution Battle"
10	Future Vision 2989	November 11, 2013; 978-4-08-870825-6	November 4, 2014; 978-1-42-156010-6
39. "Blight: Amity Training"; 40. "Sushi Angst"; 41. "Ultimate Space-Time Bonding Journey"; 42. "Black Market Monme"; 43. "Future Vision 2989"
11	Fraudulent Daughter	January 1, 2015; 978-4-08-880202-2	December 1, 2015; 978-1-42-158258-0
44. "Future Vision 2989 - Part 2"; 45. "Fraudulent Daughter"; 46. "No Grudges"; 47. "Baring Fangs, Dressed in White"; 48. "Future Yoichi, Reopened Inkstone"
Yamato sees the future, where Good and Evil Doji have joined together to attack Dunstan Castle; this suggests that neither good or evil was stronger than the other. However, he also learns that Sayama is Dunstan's daughter. Returning to his present self, he is left sulking about his actions. However, he is encouraged by "Oldie" to believe that everyone is "just trying to survive" and that Sayama must feel ashamed of being Dunstan's daughter. Fusataro picks a fight with Yamato, deciding whoever wins joins the winner's side. Rune observes the fight, stopping Rage before he can kill Yamato; through his taunting, Rune helps Yamato see a new form of good. This allows him to achieve a new ICON form called God Ultimo Frontal Till Dawn. Yamato explains that he's decided to give; Runs is then left shocked when Jealousy's heart-reading shows that Yamato loves Rune, platonically of course. Sayama arrives, using Regula's memory manipulation to stop Rune; she needs to prevent the future Yamato saw, but wonders if he'll still love her.
12	Beyond Extremes	December 4, 2015; 978-4-08-880470-5	December 6, 2016; 978-1-42-159013-4
49. "Two Hearts Together"; 50. "One Realization"; 51. "Beyond Extremes, Good and Evil Connect"; Extra: "Karakuri Illustrated Profiles"; Extra: "Karakuri Dôji Ultimo: 0"
In a shocking turn of events, Yamato and K turn the tables on Dunstan's experiment; back in his Bandit incarnation, Yamato had heard Dunstan tell him that Ultimo and Vice were once a single soul. So the pure Good and Evil combine into a new Doji with a balanced soul. This is enough to end the fight against Dunstan. However, Yamato again finds himself reliving the day of Chapter 1. In this new reality, the Doji live human lives, as its the next stage of the Hundred Machine Funeral. Seeing he managed to get through to Dunstan at least partially, Yamato decides to make the most of the new world.
