= List of Hellsing chapters =

This is a list of volumes and chapters of the manga series Hellsing written and illustrated by Kouta Hirano. It first premiered in Young King Ours in 1997 and ran for eleven years until the final chapter was released in the November 2008 issue. The individual chapters are collected and published in tankōbon volumes by Shōnen Gahosha, with all 10 volumes released as of March 2009. In 2001, Hirano began publishing chapters of a prequel series, Hellsing: The Dawn, in special editions of Young King OURs, with six chapters released as of September 2008. Hellsing chronicles the efforts of the mysterious and secret Hellsing Organization, as it combats vampires, zombies called "ghouls", and other supernatural foes who threaten the United Kingdom.

The series is licensed for an English language release in North America by Dark Horse Comics. The first volume was released on 1 December 2003 and as of October 2008, the company has published nine translated volumes. Chuang Yi is releasing the series in English in Singapore, with six volumes released as of October 2008, and through an agreement with the company, Madman Entertainment is re-releasing those volumes in Australia and New Zealand. Hellsing is also licensed for regional language releases in France by Editions Tonkam, in Italy by Dynit, in Germany by Planet Manga, in Poland by Japonica Polonica Fantastica and in Denmark and Sweden by Mangismo.

== Volume list ==
No.	Original release date	Original ISBN	North America release date	North America ISBN
1	1 November 1998	978-4-7859-1870-5	1 December 2003	978-1-59307-056-4
001: "Vampire Hunter" (バンパイア・ハンター); 002: "Master of Monster" (マスター ・ オブ ・モンスターズ); 003: "Murder Club" (マーダークラブ); 004: "Sword Dancer 1" (ソードダンサー 1); 005: "Sword Dancer 2" (ソードダンサー 2); 006: "Sword Dancer 3" (ソードダンサー3); Bonus: "Crossfire 1" (クロスファイア 1)
2	15 January 2000	978-4-7859-1958-0	1 March 2004	978-1-59307-057-1
007: "Dead Zone 1" (デッドゾーン 1); 008: "Dead Zone 2" (デッドゾーン 2); 009: "Dead Zone 3" (デッドゾーン 3); 010: "Dead Zone 4" (デッドゾーン 4); 011: "Balance of Power 1" (バランス・オブ・パワー 1); 012: "Balance of Power 2" (バランス・オブ・パワー 2); Bonus: "Crossfire 2" (集中砲火 2)
3	15 January 2001	978-4-7859-2047-0	1 June 2004	978-1-59307-202-5
013: "Balance of Power 3" (バランス・オブ・パワー3); 014: "Elevator Action 1" (エレベーターアクション 1); 015: "Elevator Action 2" (エレベーターアクション 2); 016: "Elevator Action 3" (エレベーターアクション 3); 017: "Elevator Action 4" (エレベーターアクション 4); 018: "Elevator Action 5" (エレベーターアクション 5); Bonus: "Crossfire 3" (集中砲火 3)
4	1 November 2001	978-4-7859-2125-5	1 September 2004	978-1-59307-259-9
019: "Elevator Action 6" (エレベーターアクション 6); 020: "Age of Empire 1" (エイジ・オブ・エンパイア 1); 021: "Age of Empire 2" (エイジ・オブ・エンパイア 2); 022: "Age of Empire 3" (エイジ・オブ・エンパイア 3); 023: "Call to Power" (コール トゥ パワー); 024: "Ultima on Line" (ウルティマオンライン); 025: "D 1"; 026: "D 2"; 027: "D 3"
5	27 February 2003	978-4-7859-2286-3	1 December 2004	978-1-59307-272-8
028: "Flash Point"; 029: "D 4"; 030: "D 5"; 031: "D 6"; 032: "D 7"; 033: "D 8"; 034: "D 9"; 035: "Xanado"; 036: "Final Fantasy 1"; 037: "Final Fantasy 2"
6	14 November 2003	978-4-7859-2373-0	1 March 2005	978-1-59307-302-2
38: "Final Fantasy 3"; 39: "Final Fantasy 4"; 40: "Final Fantasy 5"; 41: "The Screamer"; 42: "Aubird Force"; 43: "Gun Bullet"; 44: "Balloon Fight"; 45: "Soldier of Fortune 1"; 46: "Soldier of Fortune 2"; 47: "Soldier of Fortune 3"
7	27 December 2004	978-4-7859-2499-7	21 September 2005	978-1-59307-348-0
48: "Soldier of Fortune 4"; 49: "Soldier of Fortune 5"; 50: "Soldier of Fortune 6"; 51: "Last Mission"; 52: "Get Away"; 53: "Yaksa"; 54: "The Man I Love"; 55: "Ogre Battle"; 56: "Angelous"; 57: "Wizardry 1"
8	26 July 2006	978-4-7859-2666-3	4 July 2007	978-1-59307-780-8
58: "Wizardry 2"; 59: "Wizardry 3"; 60: "Wizardry 4"; 61: "Wizardry 5"; 62: "Hundred Swords 1"; 63: "Hundred Swords 2"; 64: "Hundred Swords 3"; 65: "Might and Magic 1"; 66: "Might and Magic 2"; 67: "Psyoblade"; 68: "Castle Vania 1"
9	9 November 2007	978-4-7859-2885-8	22 October 2008	978-1-59582-157-7
69: "Castle Vania 2"; 70: "Heart of Dream"; 71: "Relics"; 72: "Heart of Iron"; 73: "Finest Hour 1"; 74: "Finest Hour 2"; 75: "Finest Hour 3"; 76: "Lunatic Dawn"; 77: "Operation Wolf"; 78: "Warcraft 1"; 79: "Warcraft 2"
10	27 March 2009	978-4-7859-3131-5	19 May 2010	978-1-59582-498-1
80: "Wolffang 1"; 81: "Wolffang 2"; 82: "Black Onyx 1"; 83: "Black Onyx 2"; 84: "Black Onyx 3"; 85: "Black Onyx 4"; 86: "Sorcerian 1"; 87: "Sorcerian 2"; 88: "Oblivion"; 89: "Romancia"

== Hellsing the Dawn chapters ==
- Chapter 1
- Chapter 2
- Chapter 3
- Chapter 4
- Chapter 5
- Chapter 6
