= List of Skip Beat! chapters =

The cover of Skip Beat! vol. 1 as released by Hakusensha on July 19, 2002, in Japan.

The chapters of the ongoing Japanese shōjo manga series Skip Beat! are written and illustrated by Yoshiki Nakamura. It is the story of Kyōko Mogami, a 16-year-old girl who discovers her childhood friend, Shō Fuwa, who is an aspiring pop idol as well as the boy she loves, only keeps her around to act as a maid and earn money. Furious and heartbroken, she vows to get revenge by beating him in show business. In Japan, the manga was first published in Hakusensha's shōjo manga anthology Hana to Yume in February 2002, while in the United States, it began publishing under Viz Media's Shojo Beat label in 2006. As of June 16, 2026, 53 volumes and one fanbook have been released in Japan, and as of November 4, 2025, 51 volumes have been released in the United States. Viz Media began re-issuing the Skip Beat! manga series in a 3-in-1 VIZBIG EDITION in March 2012, and as of December 2020, 14 volumes have been released.

== Volume list ==
No.	Original release date	Original ISBN	English release date	English ISBN
1	July 19, 2002	978-4-592-17821-7	July 5, 2006	978-1-4215-0585-5
001. "And the Box Was Opened"; 002. "Once She Haunts You, There's No Stopping It"; 003. "The Feast of Horror, part 1"; 004. "The Feast of Horror, part 2"; 005. "The Emotion She Lacks"; End Notes
2	November 19, 2002	978-4-592-17822-4	September 5, 2006	978-1-59116-915-4
006. "The Labyrinth of Renion"; 007. "That Name is Taboo"; 008. "The Danger Zone"; 009. "Princess Coup d'Etat-The Bullying Princess"; 010. "Princess Coup d'Etat-Invitation to the Ball"; 011. "Princess Coup d'Etat-Magic"
3	March 19, 2003	978-4-592-17823-1	November 7, 2006	978-1-4215-0587-9
012. "Princess Coup d'Etat-The Battle Ball"; 013. "Princess Coup d'Etat-Light My Fire"; 014. "Princess Coup d'Etat-12:00 AM"; 015. "Sink or Swim Together"; 016. "The Miraculous Language of Angels, part 1"; 017. "The Miraculous Language of Angels, part 2"
4	July 18, 2003	978-4-592-17824-8	January 2, 2007	978-1-4215-0588-6
018. "The Miraculous Language of Angels, part 3"; 019. "The Blue on Her Palm"; 020. "The Cursed Night"; 021. "A One-in-a-Million Change for Revenge"; 022. "That's the Rule"; 023. "The True Face of the Storm"
5	November 17, 2003	978-4-592-17825-5	March 6, 2007	978-1-4215-1022-4
024. "The Other Side of Impact"; 025. "Her Open Wound"; 026. "Ready for Battle"; 027. "The Battle Girls"; 028. "A Desperate Situation"; 029. "The Reason for Her Smile"
6	February 19, 2004	978-4-592-17826-2	May 1, 2007	978-1-4215-1023-1
030. "The Secret Stamp Book"; 031. "Together in the Minefield"; 032. "Her Lost Youth"; 033. "An Emergency Situation"; 034. "Image Crash"; 035. "Dislike x Dislike"; Extra: "A Scary True Story You Don't Know"
7	July 16, 2004	978-4-592-17827-9	July 3, 2007	978-1-4215-1024-8
036. "The Road of Glamorous Success"; 037. "The Grating Wheel"; 038. "The Date of Destiny"; 039. "A Ghost of Herself"; 040. "Armageddon"; 041. "Killing the Devil"
8	October 19, 2004	978-4-592-17828-6	September 4, 2007	978-1-4215-1025-5
042. "Sin Like an Angel"; 043. "The Last Rite"; 044. "Prisoner"; 045. "A Happy Break"; 046. "An Unexpected Cold Front"; 047. "Mysterious Guy, Mysterious Girl"; 048. "An Encounter with Catastrophe"
9	February 18, 2005	978-4-592-17829-3	November 6, 2007	978-1-4215-1026-2
049. "The Forbidden Confession"; 050. "Surprise Hurricane"; 051. "End of the Dark Road"; 052. "The Unexpected Truth"; 053. "Looked Like Smooth Sailing"; 054. "Invitation to the Moon"; Extra: "A Bit of a Leftover Story"
10	June 17, 2005	978-4-592-17830-9	January 1, 2008	978-1-4215-1399-7
055. "Tsukigomori"; 056. "Qualified People"; 057. "Memory of the Heart"; 058. "Unexpected Wind"; 059. "The Day the World Broke"; 060. "Each Person's Shadow"
11	October 19, 2005	978-4-592-17831-6	March 4, 2008	978-1-4215-1751-3
061. "And the Trigger Was Pulled"; 062. "Lunar Eclipse"; 063. "The Permissible Encounter"; 064. "The Spell at Dawn"; 065. "The Silent Siren"; 066. "Unbalanced Lock"; Extra: "A Scary True Story You Don't Know: Yashiro Yukihito (25) Edition"
12	February 17, 2006	978-4-592-17832-3	May 6, 2008	978-1-4215-1752-0
067. "Deep Shock"; 068. "A One-Night Connection"; 069. "The Game Heats Up"; 070. "Honey Trap"; 071. "A Guilty Scene"; 072. "Scenario Takeover"
13	June 19, 2006	978-4-592-17833-0	July 1, 2008	978-1-4215-1753-7
073. "DARK MOON"; 074. "The Drama Trick"; 075. "Climax Concerto"; 076. "Love Phantom"; 077. "Access to the Blue"; 078. "The Fairy's Magic"
14	October 19, 2006	978-4-592-17834-7	September 2, 2008	978-1-4215-1754-4
079. "Suddenly, a Love Story- Introduction"; 080. "Suddenly, a Love Story- Section A"; 081. "Suddenly, a Love Story- Section A, Part 2"; 082. "Suddenly, a Love Story- Section A, Part 3"; 083. "Suddenly, a Love Story- Section B"; 084. "Suddenly, a Love Story- Section B, Part 2"
15	February 19, 2007	978-4-592-17835-4	November 4, 2008	978-1-4215-1952-4
085. "Suddenly, a Love Story- Section B, Part 3"; 086. "Suddenly, a Love Story- Section B, Part 4"; 087. "Suddenly, a Love Story- Refrain, Part 1"; 088. "Suddenly, a Love Story- Refrain, Part 2"; 089. "Suddenly, a Love Story- Refrain, Part 3"; 090. "Suddenly, a Love Story- *Repeat"
16	June 19, 2007	978-4-592-17836-1	January 6, 2009	978-1-4215-2040-7
091. "Suddenly, a Love Story- **Repeat"; 092. "Suddenly, a Love Story- ***Repeat"; 093. "Suddenly, a Love Story- ****Repeat"; 094. "Suddenly, a Love Story- Ending, Part 1"; 095. "Suddenly, a Love Story- Ending, Part 2"; 096. "Suddenly, a Love Story- Ending, Part 3"
17	October 19, 2007	978-4-592-17837-8	March 3, 2009	978-1-4215-2352-1
097. "Suddenly, a Love Story- Ending, Part 4"; 098. "Suddenly, a Love Story- Ending, Part 5"; 099. "Suddenly, a Love Story- The End"; 100. "Off to a Good Start!"; 101. "Encounter!! A Dynamite Star"; 102. "Fireballs Between the ☆ T-w-o"
18	February 19, 2008	978-4-592-17838-5	May 5, 2009	978-1-4215-2598-3
103. "Bad News"; 104. "She's Given a Mask"; 105. "Tomorrow She's Corn"; 106. "A Bewildering Situation"; 107. "A Mischievous Situation"; 108. "A Dream Cast"
19	July 17, 2008	978-4-592-17839-2	October 6, 2009	978-1-4215-2780-2
109. "And Then Someone Stirs"; 110. "Clearing Up the Matter"; 111. "Unfading Feelings"; 112. "Parent and Child Memorial Day"; 113. "The Depth of the 5th Year"; 114. "Kuon's Oath"
20	October 17, 2008	978-4-592-17840-8	March 2, 2010	978-1-4215-3072-7
115. "Lucky Number '24', Part 1"; 116. "Lucky Number '24', Part 2"; 117. "Lucky Number '24', Part 3"; 118. "Lucky Number '24', Part 4"; 119. "Lucky Number '24', Part 5"; 120. "Lucky Number '25'"
21	February 19, 2009	978-4-592-18611-3	August 3, 2010	978-1-4215-3270-7
121. "Happiness Warning"; 122. "Invincible Rose"; 123. "Wake Me Up!"; 124. "The Unseen After Image"; 125. "Black and White"; 126. "Dash to Natsu"
Fan Book ~Love Me!~	March 19, 2009	978-4-592-18697-7	—	—
Color illustration gallery; Prologue. Character relationship chart; Stage 1. Main cast & Quest; Stage 2. Sub cast & Showbiz; Stage 3. Playlist & Guide; Stage 4. Past & Episode; X. "Lucky Number '25' After ~Sweet Bitter~"; Stage 5. Best & Contest
22	June 19, 2009	978-4-592-18612-0	December 7, 2010	978-1-4215-3508-1
127. "Private Exit"; 128. "Switchover"; 129. "Slow Burning War"; 130. "Reversal"; 131. "The Image that Emerged"; 132. "Cross Eyes"
23	October 19, 2009	978-4-592-18613-7	April 5, 2011	978-1-4215-3692-7
133. "The "Right Hand" That Is Unable To Resist"; 134. "Midblast!"; 135. "Continuous Palpatations"; 136. "Kiss and Cry"; 137. "Vivid Walker"; 138. "Trouble Rush"
24	February 19, 2010	978-4-592-18614-4	July 5, 2011	978-1-4215-3833-4
139. "Valentine Target"; 140. "Valentine's Scramble"; 141. "Valentine's Revolution"; 142. "Valentine's Joker"; 143. "Valentine Bell"; 144. "Valentine Guerilla"; Extra: "Valentine's Mystery: Yashiro Yukihito Edition"
25	June 18, 2010	978-4-592-18615-1	October 4, 2011	978-1-4215-3923-2
145. "Valentine's Bug"; 146. "Valentine Match"; 147. "Valentine's Weapon"; 148. "Valentine's Day-XXXX"; 149. "The Poison Flower"; 150. "The Faint Scar"; Extra: "Valentine's Mystery: vs. Reino Edition"
26	October 19, 2010	978-4-592-18616-8	January 3, 2012	978-1-4215-3999-7
151. "The Strongest Emblem"; 152. "Violence Mission, Phase 1"; 153. "Violence Mission, Phase 1.5"; 154. "Violence Mission, Phase 2"; 155. "Violence Mission, Phase 3"; 156. "Violence Mission, Phase 3.5"; Extra: "Valentine's Mystery: Mogami Kyoko Edition"
27	February 18, 2011	978-4-592-18617-5	April 3, 2012	978-1-4215-4108-2
157. "Violence Mission, Phase 4"; 158. "Violence Mission, Phase 5"; 159. "Violence Mission, Phase 5.5"; 160. "Violence Mission, Phase 6"; 161. "Violence Mission, Phase 6.5"; 162. "Violence Mission, Phase 7"; 163. "Violence Mission, Phase 7.5"
28	June 20, 2011	978-4-592-18618-2	July 3, 2012	978-1-4215-4219-5
164. "Violence Mission, Phase 8"; 165. "Violence Mission, Phase 9"; 166. "Violence Mission, Phase 9.5"; 167. "Violence Mission, Phase 10"; 168. "Violence Mission, Phase 10.5"; 169. "Violence Mission, Phase 11"; 170. "Violence Mission, Phase 12"
29	November 18, 2011	978-4-592-18619-9	October 2, 2012	978-1-4215-4334-5
171. "Psychedelic Caution"; 172. "Psychedelic Caution"; 173. "Wonder Emotion"; 174. "Diamond Emotion"; 175. "Heel Chic"; 176. "Hero's High"
30	March 19, 2012	978-4-592-18620-5	February 5, 2013	978-1-4215-5061-9
177. "Dark Breath"; 178. "Dark Breath"; 179. "Dark Breath"; 180. "Dark Breath"; 181. "Dark Breath"; 182. "Dark Breath"
31	September 20, 2012	978-4-592-19491-0	June 4, 2013	978-1-4215-5479-2
183. "Dark Breath"; 184. "Dark Breath"; 185. "Dark Breath"; 186. "Dark Breath"; 187. "Dark Breath"; 188. "Dark Breath"; Extra: "The Reason His Number-Withheld Calls Stopped"
32	March 19, 2013	978-4-592-19492-7	December 3, 2013	978-1-4215-6234-6
189. "Dark Breath"; 190. "Dark Breath"; 191. "Dark Breath"; 192. "Dark Breath"; 193. "Dark Breath"; 194. "Dark Breath"
33	September 20, 2013	978-4-592-19493-4	September 2, 2014	978-1-4215-6952-9
195. "Dark Breath"; 196. "Dark Breath"; 197. "Turning Point"; 198. "Tragic Marker"; 199. "Killed, by the Death God"; 200. "Her Prayer is for One Thing"; Extra: "Him Then."
34	March 20, 2014	978-4-592-19494-1	April 7, 2015	978-1-4215-7743-2
201. "Despair Seesaw"; 202. "L'entracte"; 203. "A Step Towards Atonement"; 204. "Technicolor Paradise ~Hot Spot~"; 205. "Technicolor Paradise ~Hot Spot~"; 206. "Technicolor Paradise ~Hot Limit~"; Extra: "Dream Contact"
35	September 19, 2014	978-4-592-19495-8	September 1, 2015	978-1-4215-8034-0
207. "Technicolor Paradise ~Hot Limit~"; 208. "Technicolor Paradise ~Hot Spell~"; 209. "Technicolor Paradise ~Hot Spell~"; 210. "Technicolor Paradise ~Hot Spell~"; 211. "Technicolor Paradise ~Melt Heart~"; 212. "Technicolor Paradise ~Time Shift~"; Extra: "Them Then"
36	March 20, 2015	978-4-592-19496-5	March 1, 2016	978-1-4215-8450-8
213. "Technicolor Paradise ~Go Ahead!~"; 214. "Overhead First Star ~The Faraway Dream~"; 215. "Absolute Sign"; 216. "Tiny Monsoon"; 217. "Tiny Monsoon"; 218. "Crystal Stream"
37	September 18, 2015	978-4-592-19497-2	September 6, 2016	978-1-4215-8714-1
219. "Crystal Stream"; 220. "Crystal Stream"; 221. "Crystal Storm"; 222. "Crystal Storm"; 223. "Crystal Storm"; 224. "Pressure Change"
38	March 18, 2016	978-4-592-19498-9	March 7, 2017	978-1-4215-9161-2
225. "Pop Chord"; 226. "Marble Flag"; 227. "Spiral Echo"; 228. "Ground Call"; 229. "Ground Call"; 230. "Ground Call"; Extra: "Them Then"
39	September 20, 2016	978-4-592-19499-6	September 5, 2017	978-1-4215-9586-3
231. "Ground Call"; 232. "Endless Give Up"; 233. "Clear Mist"; 234. "A Lotus in the Mud"; 235. "Sakura Messenger"; 236. "Howling Ambition"; Extra: "Him Then"
40	March 20, 2017	978-4-592-19500-9; 978-4-592-10571-8 (limited edition)	March 6, 2018	978-1-4215-9829-1
237. "Samurai and Hunter"; 238. "Toward the Point of Impact"; 239. "A Fallen Green Leaf"; 240. "The Consummate Pick-up Artist"; 241. "The Cause for Worry"; 242. "The Rope of Hope"
41	October 20, 2017	978-4-592-21641-4	September 4, 2018	978-1-9747-0135-3
243. "Undead Monster"; 244. "Undead Monster"; 245. "Survivor Combat"; 246. "Survivor Combat"; 247. "Survivor Combat"; 248. "Flying Shock"
42	March 18, 2018	978-4-592-21642-1	March 5, 2019	978-1-9747-0516-0
249. "Flying Shock"; 250. "Flying Shock"; 251. "Flying Shock"; 252. "Flying Shock"; 253. "Flying Shock"; 254. "Flying Shock"; 255. "Flying Shock"
43	January 18, 2019	978-4-592-21643-8	November 5, 2019	978-1-9747-1041-6
256. "Unexpected Result"; 257. "Unexpected Result – Hungry Ghost"; 258. "Unexpected Result – Hungry Ghost"; 259. "Unexpected Result – Ghost Card"; 260. "Unexpected Result – Ghost Card"; 261. "Unexpected Result – Two Days Before"; 262. "Unexpected Result – Two Days Before"; 263. "Unexpected Result – Two Days Before"
44	September 20, 2019	978-4-592-21644-5; 978-4-592-10615-9 (limited edition)	September 1, 2020	978-1-9747-1524-4
264. "Unexpected Result – Two Days Before"; 265. "Unexpected Result – Two Days Before"; 266. "Unexpected Result – The Day Before"; 267. "Unexpected Result – The Day Before"; 268. "Unexpected Result – The Day Before"; 269. "Unexpected Result – The Day Itself"; 270. "Unexpected Result – The Day Itself"; 271. "Unexpected Result – The Day Itself"
45	May 20, 2020	978-4-592-21645-2	March 2, 2021	978-1-9747-2110-8
272. "Unexpected Result – The Day Itself"; 273. "Disaster – Spreading Water Ripples"; 274. "Disaster – A roaring vortex"; 275. "Disaster – Impending Doom"; 276. "Disaster – Landfall"; 277. "Ambush – Sneaking onto Noah's ark"; 278. "Ambush – Sneaking onto Noah's ark"; 279. "Ambush – Sneaking onto Noah's ark
46	January 20, 2021	978-4-592-21646-9	April 5, 2022	978-1-9747-1723-1
280. "Ambush – Sneaking onto Noah's Ark"; 281. "The Apple That Fell"; 282. "The Apple That Fell"; 283. "The Apple That Fell"; 284. "Sign of Spring – Awakening to an Unexpected State of Affairs"; 285. "Sign of Spring – Awakening to an Unexpected State of Affairs"; 286. "Li'l Venus – Lightning Flash"
47	September 17, 2021	978-4-592-21647-6	November 1, 2022	978-1-9747-3243-2
287. "Route Kingdom"; 288. "Route Kingdom"; 289. "Route Kingdom"; 290. "Route Kingdom"; 291. "Route Kingdom"; 292. "Route Kingdom"; 293. "Route Kingdom"; 294. "Route Kingdom"
48	June 20, 2022	978-4-592-21648-3; 978-4-592-10631-9 (limited edition)	May 2, 2023	978-1-9747-3856-4
295. "Route Kingdom"; 296. "Route Kingdom"; 297. "Route Kingdom"; 298. "Route Kingdom"; 299. "Route Kingdom"; 300. "Midnight Trap"; 301. "Midnight Trap"; 302. "Midnight Trap"
49	March 20, 2023	978-4-592-21649-0	April 2, 2024	978-1-9747-4367-4
303. "Error Link"; 304. "Fairytale Prologue"; 305. "Fairytale Dialogue"; 306. "Fairytale Dialogue"; 307. "Fairytale Dialogue"; 308. "Fairytale Dialogue"; 309. "Fairytale Dialogue"; 310. "Fairytale Dialogue"
50	March 19, 2024	978-4-592-22480-8	March 4, 2025	978-1-9747-5388-8
311. "Fairytale Dialogue" (フェアリーテール・ダイアローグ); 312. "Fairytale Epilogue" (フェアリーテール・エピローグ); 313. "Grand Cross of Fate – The Moment when the Stars on Earth Come Together" (運命のグランドクロスー地上の星が集う瞬間ー); 314. "Grand Cross of Fate – The Moment when the Stars on Earth Come Together" (運命のグランドクロスー地上の星が集う瞬間ー); 315. "Grand Cross of Fate – The Moment when the Stars on Earth Come Together" (運命のグランドクロスー地上の星が集う瞬間ー); 316. "Grand Cross of Fate – The Moment when the Stars on Earth Come Together" (運命のグランドクロスー地上の星が集う瞬間ー); 317. "Grand Cross of Fate – The Moment when the Stars on Earth Come Together" (運命のグランドクロスー地上の星が集う瞬間ー); 318. "Grand Cross of Fate – The Moment when the Stars on Earth Come Together" (運命のグランドクロスー地上の星が集う瞬間ー)
51	December 20, 2024	978-4-592-22509-6	November 4, 2025	978-1-9747-5902-6
319. "Grand Cross of Fate – The Moment when the Stars on Earth Come Together" (運命のグランドクロスー地上の星が集う瞬間ー); 320. "Grand Cross of Fate – The Moment when the Stars on Earth Come Together" (運命のグランドクロスー地上の星が集う瞬間ー); 321. "Grand Cross of Fate – The Moment when the Stars on Earth Come Together" (運命のグランドクロスー地上の星が集う瞬間ー); 322. "Grand Cross of Fate – The Moment when the Stars on Earth Come Together" (運命のグランドクロスー地上の星が集う瞬間ー); 323. "Grand Cross of Fate – Stars Meet in Secret" (運命のグランドクロスー密かな星合ー); 324. "Grand Cross of Fate – Stars Meet in Secret" (運命のグランドクロスー密かな星合ー); 325. "Grand Cross of Fate – Burn the Fields" (運命のグランドクロスーBurn The Fieldー); 326. "Grand Cross of Fate – Burn the Fields" (運命のグランドクロスーBurn The Fieldー)
52	September 19, 2025	978-4-592-22545-4	November 3, 2026	978-1-9747-6898-1
327. "Grand Cross of Fate – Burn the Fields" (運命のグランドクロスーBurn The Fieldー); 328. (運命のグランドクロス－箱庭 Drama－); 329. (運命のグランドクロス－箱庭 Drama－); 330; 331 Grand cross of destiny Ensemble; 332 The fog of a bad omen; 333; 334 Channel tuning
53	June 19, 2026	978-4-592-22583-6	—	—

== Chapters not yet in tankōbon format ==
- 335 Channel tuning
- 336 Channel tuning
