= List of Fairy Tail chapters (volumes 1–15) =

The cover of the first volume of Fairy Tail as published by Kodansha on December 15, 2006, in Japan

Fairy Tail is a Japanese manga series that was written and illustrated by Hiro Mashima; it has been translated into various languages and has spawned a substantial media franchise. The series follows the adventures of the dragon-slayer Natsu Dragneel as he searches for a dragon called Igneel and partners with seventeen-year-old celestial wizard Lucy Heartfilia who joins the titular guild. In Japan, the series has been published by Kodansha in Weekly Shōnen Magazine since August 2, 2006, and in tankōbon format since December 15, 2006. Fairy Tail has 63 volumes and 545 chapters.

The series was originally published in English by Del Rey Manga beginning on March 25, 2008, and ending with the 12th volume in September 2010. Since then, in the United States and Canada, Kodansha USA and Random House have published the English-language adaptation of the series, beginning with the 13th volume in May 2011; they also re-published the earlier 12 volumes under their names. All 63 English volumes have been released.

== Volume list ==
No.	Original release date	Original ISBN	North American release date	North American ISBN
1	December 15, 2006	978-4-06-363771-7	March 25, 2008	978-0-345-50133-2
1. "The Fairy's Tail" (妖精の尻尾(フェアリーテイル), Fearī Teiru); 2. "The Master Appears!" (総長(マスター)あらわる！, Masutā Arawaru!); 3. "Fire Dragons and Monkeys and Cows" (火竜と猿と牛, Karyū to Saru to Ushi); 4. "The Celestial Spirit of Canis Minor" (子犬座の星霊, Koinuza no Seirei)
Lucy Heartfilia aspires to join the popular wizard's guild Fairy Tail despite its reputation for causing destruction. She encounters the Dragon Slayer wizard Natsu Dragneel and his cat-like partner, Happy, who are both searching for the dragon Igneel, Natsu's adoptive father. Later, Lucy is nearly tricked into slavery by a criminal impersonating the Fairy Tail wizard Salamander, but she is rescued by Natsu, who is revealed as the real Salamander and invites her into the guild. Natsu, Lucy, and Happy embark on a mission to save fellow member Macao Conbolt from a monster, after which the three form an official team together.
2	January 17, 2007	978-4-06-363782-3	March 25, 2008	978-0-345-50330-5
5. "Daybreak" (DAY BREAK(日の出), Hi no De); 6. "Invade!! The Everlue Mansion" (潜入せよ！！エバルー屋敷!!, Sennyūse yo!! Ebarū Yashiki!!); 7. "The Wizard's Weakness" (魔導士の弱点, Madōshi no Jakuten); 8. "Lucy vs. Duke Everlue" (ルーシィ vs. エバルー公爵, Rūshii vs. Ebarū Kōshaku); 9. "Dear Kaby" (DEAR KABY(親愛なるカービィへ), Shin'ai Naru Kābii e); 10. "The Armored Wizard" (鎧の魔道士, Yoroi no Madōshi); 11. "Natsu on the Train" (その列車はナツを乗せていく, Sono Ressha wa Natsu o Nosete Iku); 12. "Spell Song" (呪歌, Juka); 13. "Death Laughs Twice" (死神は二度笑う, Shinigami wa Nido Warau)
Natsu, Lucy, and Happy accept a mission to destroy the book Daybreak, which their client, the son of its deceased author, blames for ruining his father's life. Lucy learns from a secret message in the book that its author was forced by the corrupt Duke Everlue to write it for three years in solitary confinement before committing suicide; she persuades their client to keep Daybreak, decoding it as a memoir dedicated to him by his father. Later, Natsu and his guildmate Gray Fullbuster are approached by Erza Scarlet, one of Fairy Tail's strongest members, to help her stop the dark guild Eisenwald from using the cursed flute Lullaby to carry out an assassination.
3	March 16, 2007	978-4-06-363810-3	June 24, 2008	978-0-345-50556-9
14. "Titania" (妖精女王(ティターニア), Titānia); 15. "Fairies in the Wind" (妖精たちは風の中, Yōsei-tachi wa Kaze no Naka); 16. "Capture Kageyama!!" (カゲヤマを捕まえろ！！, Kageyama o Tsukamaero!!); 17. "The Virgin Magic" (乙女の魔法, Otome no Mahō); 18. "Fire and Wind" (炎と風, Honō to Kaze); 19. "Impossible! Natsu Can't Win!" (無理、ナツじゃ勝てないよ｡, Muri, Natsu ja Katenai yo.); 20. "To Live Strong" (強く生きる為に, Tsuyoku Ikiru Tame ni); 21. "The Most Powerful Team!!!" (最強チーム！！！, Saikyō Chīmu!!!); 22. "Natsu vs. Erza" (ナツ vs. エルザ, Natsu vs. Eruza)
Natsu's team discovers that Eisenwald is targeting a conference of guild masters, including Fairy Tail master Makarov Dreyar. Natsu defeats the dark guild's leader, Erigor, while Makarov dissuades Eisenwald member Kageyama from carrying out the plot. This enrages a demon sealed within Lullaby, which emerges to kill everyone present, but is destroyed by Natsu, Gray, and Erza. Shortly after the team returns home to Magnolia, Erza is arrested by an emissary of the Magic Council for the damages caused during the battle with Eisenwald.
4	May 17, 2007	978-4-06-363832-5	September 16, 2008	978-0-345-50557-6
23. "Crime and Punishment" (罪と罰, Tsumi to Batsu); 24. "Second Floor" (2階, Ni-kai); 25. "The Cursed Island" (呪われた島, Norowareta Shima); 26. "Is the Moon Out Tonight?" (月は出ているか, Tsuki wa Dete Iru ka); 27. "Deliora" (デリオラ, Deriora); 28. "Moon Drip" (月の雫(ムーンドリップ), Mūn Dorippu); 29. "Gray and Lyon" (グレイとリオン, Gurei to Rion); 30. "The Dream Continues" (夢の続き, Yume no Tsuzuki)
Natsu attempts to rescue Erza from the Council, but learns that they contrived her arrest to assert authority over Fairy Tail. To prove his strength, Natsu and Happy steal an S-Class job request without Makarov's permission and persuade Lucy to join them; Gray attempts to stop the three, but is dragged into the mission. The job requires them to lift a curse that transforms the people of Galuna Island into demons when they are exposed to the island's purple moonlight. The team investigates the island and finds a cult of wizards led by Gray's former training mate Lyon Vastia, who is using the ceremonial Moon Drip spell to resurrect and defeat the eternally frozen demon Deliora, whom their teacher, Ur, sacrificed herself to seal away.
5	July 17, 2007	978-4-06-363857-8	January 27, 2009	978-0-345-50558-3
31. "The Terrifying 2X-Poison Jelly" (恐怖の毒毒ゼリー, Kyōfu no Dokudoku Zerī); 32. "Natsu vs. Wave-Motion Yȗka" (ナツ vs. 波動のユウカ, Natsu vs. Hadō no Yūka); 33. "Close? The Golden Bovine Gate" (閉じろ？金牛宮の扉, Tojiro? Kingyūkyū no Tobira); 34. "The Sword of Judgment" (裁きの剣, Sabaki no Ken); 35. "Do Whatever You Like!!" (勝手にしやがれ！！, Katte ni Shiyagare!!); 36. "Ur" (ウル, Uru); 37. "The Blue Bird" (青い鳥, Aoi Tori); 38. "Eternal Magic" (永遠の魔法, Eien no Mahō); 39. "The Ice Blade of Tragic Reality" (真実は悲しき氷の刃, Shinjitsu wa Kanashiki Kōri no Yaiba)
After Natsu's team defeats Lyon's henchmen, Erza arrives to bring them back to Fairy Tail for punishment for their disobedience, but is convinced by Gray to help them complete their mission. Gray reveals to his friends that Ur is still alive in the form of the ice freezing Deliora, having used the forbidden spell Iced Shell to save Gray's life when he recklessly attacked Deliora for killing his parents ten years earlier, and that Lyon blames Gray for Ur's supposed death. Gray attempts to dissuade Lyon from using Moon Drip to melt the ice, which would kill Ur, but is enraged when Lyon admits he already knows about her survival.
6	September 14, 2007	978-4-06-363890-5	April 28, 2009	978-0-345-50681-8
40. "Galuna Island: The Final Battle" (ガルナ島 最終決戦, Garuna-tō, Saishū Kessen); 41. "The Demon's War Cry" (悪魔のおたけび, Akuma no Otakebi); 42. "The Arc of Time" (時のアーク, Toki no Āku); 43. "Burst"; 44. "The Villagers' Secret" (村人の秘密, Murabito no Himitsu); 45. "Make It There, to the Sky" (届け あの空に, Todoke, Ano Sora ni); 46. "Tear" (涙(TEAR)); 47. "Phantom Lord" (幽鬼の支配者(ファントムロード), Fantomu Rōdo); 48. "Human Law" (人間の法律, Ningen no Hōritsu)
Gray defeats Lyon, but is too late to stop Deliora's resurrection; however, Deliora immediately dies as a result of being frozen for ten years. Erza determines the islanders' curse to be caused by a magical membrane created over the island by Moon Drop, and destroys it with Natsu's help; instead of turning human, the islanders are revealed to be demons whose memories were altered. The team returns to Magnolia and find their guildhall demolished by the rival guild Phantom Lord. When Levy McGarden and her friends are assaulted by Gajeel Redfox, a Dragon Slayer from Phantom Lord, Makarov declares war against them. Meanwhile, Lucy is captured by Juvia Lockser and Sol, two of Phantom Lord's elite Element 4 team.
7	November 16, 2007	978-4-06-363914-8	July 7, 2009	978-0-345-51039-6
49. "The Moon Can Be Hidden by Clouds; Flowers Can Be Scattered by the Wind" (月ニ叢雲 花ニ風, Tsuki ni Murakumo, Hana ni Kaze); 50. "Lucy Heartfilia" (ルーシィ・ハートフィリア, Rūshii Hātofiria); 51. "Giant Shadow" (巨影, Kyoei); 52. "15 Minutes" (15分, Jūgo-fun); 53. "The Heat of Battle" (激熱の戦い, Gekinetsu no Tatakai); 54. "Phantom MkII" (ファントムMkII, Fantomu Māku Tsū); 55. "So No One Sees the Tears" (その涙を見ない為に, Sono Namida o Minai Tame ni); 56. "A Flower that Blooms in the Rain" (雨の中に咲く華, Ame no Naka ni Saku Hana)
Fairy Tail withdraws their attack on Phantom Lord's guildhall when Makarov's magical power is drained by Aria, the Element 4's leader. Meanwhile, Phantom Lord master Jose Porla reveals to Lucy that her uncaring father hired them to retrieve her. After Natsu rescues Lucy, Jose leads an attack on Fairy Tail's guildhall and injures Erza with a blast from Phantom Lord's magic cannon, Jupiter. Natsu enters Phantom Lord's mobile fortress and destroys the cannon's power source, defeating Element 4 member Totomaru in the process. In response, Jose prepares to cast the destructive spell Abyss Break on Magnolia itself. Elfman Strauss defeats Sol when he sees his sister Mirajane in danger, while Gray battles Juvia, who is instantly smitten with him.
8	January 17, 2008	978-4-06-363940-7	October 27, 2009	978-0-345-51040-2
57. "Fair-Weather Charm" (てるてる坊主, Teru Teru Bōzu); 58. "There Is Always Someone Better" (上には上がいる, Ue ni wa Ue ga Iru); 59. "Inspire"; 60. "Wings of Fire" (炎の翼, Honō no Tsubasa); 61. "The Two Dragon Slayers" (二人の滅竜魔導士(ドラゴンスレイヤー), Futari no Doragon Sureiyā); 62. "When the Fairy Fell" (妖精の堕ちる時, Yōsei no Ochiru Toki); 63. "Now We're Even" (これで おあいこな, Kore de, Oaiko na); 64. "The Best Guild" (一番のギルド, Ichiban no Girudo); 65. "Fairy Law" (フェアリーロウ, Fearī Rō)
Gray and a healed Erza defeat Juvia and Aria, which stops the casting of Abyss Break. Gajeel recaptures Lucy and is confronted by Natsu, who is overpowered by Gajeel's iron magic. Natsu defeats Gajeel after watching the destruction of his own guildhall and regaining his energy when Lucy summons her celestial spirit Sagittarius to start a fire for him to eat. Meanwhile, Makarov recovers and duels Jose to stop him from killing Erza, defeating him by casting his ultimate spell, Fairy Law.
9	March 17, 2008	978-4-06-363965-0	December 29, 2009	978-0-345-51233-8
66. "Like-Minded" (同志, Dōshi); 67. "My Decision" (あたしの決意, Atashi no Ketsui); 68. "Goodbye" (さよなら, Sayonara); 69. "Next Generation"; 70. "Frederick & Yanderica" (フレデリックとヤンデリカ, Furederikku to Yanderika); 71. "A Night in Impatiens" (鳳仙花の夜, Hōsenka no Yoru); 72. "The Star That Will Never Return to the Sky" (空に戻れない星, Sora ni Modorenai Hoshi); 73. "Year 781: Blue Pegasus" (781年・青い天馬(ブルーペガスス), Nana-hyaku Hachi-jū Ichi-nen: Burū Pegasusu); 74. "Celestial Spirit King" (星霊王, Seirei-ō)
Phantom Lord disbands following its defeat, while Lucy cuts ties with her father and helps her friends rebuild their guildhall. Lucy becomes troubled by Loke's attempts to distance himself from her, discovering that he is the celestial spirit Leo, who has been exiled from his realm for accidentally causing the death of his owner to save fellow spirit Aries from her cruelty. Loke reveals that he will soon run out of energy and die; desperate to save Loke, Lucy persuades the Celestial Spirit King to rescind Loke's exile, allowing Loke to return to his realm as one of Lucy's contracted spirits.
10	May 16, 2008	978-4-06-363986-5	March 23, 2010	978-0-345-51457-8
75. "Dream of a Butterfly" (胡蝶の夢, Kochō no Yume); 76. "The Tower of Heaven" (楽園の塔, Rakuen no Tō); 77. "Jellal" (ジェラール, Jerāru); 78. "Heaven Over There" (その先の楽園, Sono Saki no Rakuen); 79. "Siegrain's Decision" (ジークレインの決断, Jīkurein no Ketsudan); 80. "Joan of Arc" (ジャンヌ・ダルク, Jannu Daruku); 81. "The Voice in the Darkness" (闇の声, Yami no Koe); 82. "Howling at the Moon" (月に吠える, Tsuki ni Hoeru); Omake. "Special Mission: Beware of Guys Who Show a Keen Interest" (特別依頼｡ 気になる彼に注意せよ！, Tokubetsu Irai. Ki ni Naru Kare ni Chūi Seyo!)
Loke invites Lucy and her friends to a paid vacation at a resort; they are joined by Juvia, who wants to join Fairy Tail. The vacation is interrupted when Erza and Happy are abducted by four of Erza's childhood friends from the Tower of Heaven, a construct built by Jellal Fernandes to resurrect the evil wizard Zeref. Erza's guildmates and Juvia infiltrate the tower to rescue her, finding her after she escapes on her own. Erza reveals that she is a former slave who led a revolt to free Jellal, who betrayed her and cast her out after being corrupted by what he believes to be Zeref's spirit. Meanwhile, Siegrain – a member of the Magic Council who resembles Jellal – persuades the council to destroy the tower with a weapon called Etherion.
11	August 12, 2008	978-4-06-384023-0	June 22, 2010	978-0-345-51992-4
83. "Find the Way"; 84. "Natsu-Cat Fight!!" (ナツネコFight!!, Natsu-neko Fight!!); 85. "Heaven's Game" (楽園ゲーム, Rakuen Gēmu); 86. "Rock of Succubus" (ロック オブ サキュバス, Rokku obu Sakyubasu); 87. "Lucy vs. Juvia" (ルーシィ vs. ジュビア, Rūshii vs. Jubia); 88. "Natsu Becomes a Meal" (ナツ、エサになる｡, Natsu, Esa ni Naru.); 89. "Armor Around the Heart" (心の鎧, Kokoro no Yoroi); 90. "Ikaruga" (斑鳩); 91. "One Woman! The Decisive Outfit" (女一匹、決意の装束, Onna Ippiki, Ketsui no Shōzoku)
Erza, Lucy, Gray, and Juvia climb the tower in search of Natsu; they are joined by two of Erza's childhood friends, Simon and Shô, after the former reveals himself to be on Erza's side. After Natsu finds Happy and defeats Erza's two other friends, Wally Buchanan and Millianna, Jellal announces the council's decision to fire Etherion upon the tower, and challenges everyone to defeat him before the attack. They continue through the tower and defeat Trinity Raven, a trio of assassins hired by Jellal.
12	October 17, 2008	978-4-06-384050-6	September 28, 2010	978-0-345-51993-1
92. "Destiny" (運命(デスティニー), Desutinī); 93. "Pray to the Sacred Light" (聖なる光に祈りを, Seinaru Hikari ni Inori o); 94. "One Person" (ひとりの人, Hitori no Hito); 95. "Sleeping Beauty Warrior" (眠れる塔の女騎士(おひめさま), Nemureru Tō no Ohime-sama); 96. "Meteor" (流星(ミーティア), Mītia); 97. "A Life as a Shield" (命の盾, Inochi no Tate); 98. "Dragon Force" (ドラゴンフォース, Doragon Fōsu); 99. "Titania Falls" (妖精女王(ティターニア)、散る, Titānia, Chiru); 100. "To Tomorrow!" (明日へ, Ashita e)
Erza battles Jellal atop the tower, but fails to stop him before Etherion fires at it. The attack is absorbed by the crystalline lacrima inside the tower, sparing everyone inside; Jellal reveals that he – as Siegrain – has tricked the Magic Council into providing the tower with enough magical energy to resurrect Zeref. While Natsu and Jellal fight, Simon sacrifices himself to protect Erza from a fatal spell cast by Jellal. Natsu eats the Etherion-infused lacrima in anger and achieves a higher form of Dragon Slayer magic called Dragon Force, which gives him enough power to defeat Jellal and destroy the tower. Erza attempts to merge herself with the lacrima to prevent it from exploding, but she is saved by Natsu, and they both to escape.
13	December 17, 2008	978-4-06-384075-9	May 10, 2011	978-1-935429-32-6
101. "Rage Within the Red Earth" (赤い大地の激昂, Akai Daichi no Gekikō); 102. "Walk Strong" (強く歩け, Tsuyoku Aruke); 103. "Home"; 104. "Best Friend"; 105. "That Man, Laxus" (その男、ラクサス, Sono Otoko, Rakusasu); 106. "The Harvest Festival" (収穫祭, Shūkakusai); 107. "The Battle of Fairy Tail" (バトル・オブ・フェアリーテイル, Batoru obu Fearī Teiru); 108. "Go-cheen" (ゴチーン！！, Gochīn!!); 109. "Friendly Fire for Friendship's Sake" (友の為に友を打て, Tomo no Tame ni Tomo o Ute)
Erza bids farewell to her slave friends, and she and the other members of Fairy Tail return to find their guildhall has been renovated. They also discover that Juvia and Gajeel have joined Fairy Tail. The guild prepares for their annual Fantasia parade. Lucy learns of a Miss Fairy Tail beauty contest, an opportunity for her to make her rent payments. Makarov's grandson Laxus Dreyar declares his intention to take over the guild by force. He and his bodyguards the Raijin Tribe turn the Miss Fairy Tail contestants to stone and challenge the rest of the guild to find and defeat the Raijin Tribe. He imprisons everyone above the age of 80 inside the guildhall to keep Makarov from interfering; Natsu is also affected by the trap. The Fairy Tail members are tricked into fighting each other.
14	March 17, 2009	978-4-06-384098-8	July 12, 2011	978-1-935429-33-3
110. "Resign" (投了(リザイン), Rizain); 111. "Four Members Remaining" (残り4人, Nokori Yonin); 112. "Bombing Runs and Sword Dances" (弾幕剣舞, Danmaku Kenbu); 113. "Thunder Palace" (神鳴殿, Kaminari Den); 114. "Love Breaks Down Walls" (愛は壁を砕いて, Ai wa Kabe o Kudaite); 115. "Regulus (The Light of the Lion)" (獅子の光(レグルス), Regurusu); 116. "Cana vs. Juvia" (カナ vs. ジュビア, Kana vs. Jubia); 117. "Satan's Halo" (サタン降臨, Satan Kōrin); 118. "Gentle Words" (やさしい言葉, Yasashii Kotoba)
Gajeel appears; like Natsu he is trapped inside the guildhall. Erza's artificial eye allows her to be restored to normal; she engages and defeats Evergreen, restoring the rest of the petrified girls. Laxus casts a Thunder Palace spell over Magnolia, threatening to destroy the city. The stress of the situation causes Makarov to collapse. Levy uses her decoding expertise to rewrite a runic enchantment and free Natsu and Gajeel inside the guildhall. Lucy engages Bickslow and defeats him with the help of Loke. Juvia and Cana encounter Fried Justine, who casts a spell that forces them to fight each other. Juvia sacrifices herself by destroying one of the Thunder Palace drones. Mirajane rushes in to find Cana defeated and Fried torturing Elfman, prompting her to use a transformation in anger. After engaging and overpowering Fried, Mirajane regains control of herself and persuades Fried to stop fighting his teammates.
15	May 15, 2009	978-4-06-384136-7	September 27, 2011	978-1-935429-34-0
119. "Attack! The Great Kardia Cathedral" (激突！カルディア大聖堂, Gekitotsu! Karudia Taiseidō); 120. "Mystogan" (ミストガン, Misutogan); 121. "My Chance to Take the Top, Right?" (てっぺんとるチャンスだろ！, Teppen Toru Chansu Daro!); 122. "The Lonely Thunder Clap" (孤独な雷鳴, Kodoku na Raimei); 123. "Double Dragon" (ダブル ドラゴン, Daburu Doragon); 124. "Triple Dragon" (トリプル ドラゴン, Toripuru Doragon); 125. "Face of a Devil, Heart of an Angel" (鬼面仏心, Kimen Busshin); 126. "Stand Up!!!!" (立ちあがれ！！！！, Tachiagare!!!!); Omake. "Side Story X778: Natsu and the Dragon's Egg" (X778 ナツとドラゴンの卵, Nana-hyaku Nana-jū Hachi: Natsu to Doragon no Tamago)
With the Raijin Tribe defeated, the masked Mystogan engages Laxus and fights him to make him lift the Thunder Palace spell. Their battle attracts the attention of Natsu and Erza, who see Laxus blasting off Mystogan's mask, revealing that he resembles Jellal. Erza and the rest of Fairy Tail destroy the Thunder Palace. Natsu and Gajeel fight Laxus but their attacks are ineffective. Laxus reveals himself to be a dragon slayer. Frustrated with his plans' failure, Laxus casts a spell to destroy Magnolia. Laxus dismisses Levy, who arrives to tell him that Makarov is dying from the stress Laxus has placed on him. After casting the spell, Laxus discovers it has no effect because he does not truly consider everyone his enemy. Laxus continues fighting and Natsu defeats him.
