= List of Inuyasha volumes =

First volume cover of Viz Media's second-edition reprint, released on April 9, 2003

The chapters of the Inuyasha manga series were written and illustrated by Rumiko Takahashi. The manga was serialized in Shogakukan's shōnen manga magazine Weekly Shōnen Sunday from 1996 to 2008. The 558 chapters were collected in 56 tankōbon volumes, released from April 18, 1997, to February 18, 2009. Shogakukan re-published the series in a 30-volume wide-ban edition, released from January 18, 2013, to June 18, 2015. Takahashi published a special epilogue chapter, titled "Since Then" (あれから, Are kara), in Weekly Shōnen Sunday on February 6, 2013, as part of the "Heroes Come Back" anthology, which comprised short stories by manga artists to raise funds for recovery of the areas afflicted by the 2011 Tōhoku earthquake and tsunami. The chapter was later included in the last volume of the wide-ban edition of the manga in 2015, and was published again in Shōnen Sunday S on October 24, 2020.

In North America, Inuyasha has been licensed for English language release by Viz Media, initially titled as Inu-Yasha. They began publishing the manga in April 1997 in an American comic book format, each issue containing two or three chapters from the original manga, and the last issue was released in February 2003, which covered up until the original Japanese 14th volume. Viz Media started publishing the series in a first trade-paperback edition, with 12 volumes published from July 6, 1998, to October 6, 2002. A second edition began with the 13th volume, released on April 9, 2003, and the first 12 volumes, following this edition, were reprinted as well. Up until the 37th volume, Viz Media published the series in left-to-right orientation, and with the release of the 38th volume on July 14, 2009, they published the remaining volumes in "unflipped" right-to-left page layout. Viz Media published the 56th and final volume of Inuyasha on January 11, 2011.

In 2009, Viz Media began publishing the series in their 3-in-1 omnibus volume "VizBig" edition, with the original unflipped chapters. The 18 volumes were released from November 10, 2009, to February 11, 2014. On December 15, 2020, Viz released the 18 volumes digitally.

== Volumes ==
=== Volumes 1–20 ===
No.	Title	Original release date	English release date
1	Turning Back Time	April 18, 1997; 4-09-125201-X	July 6, 1998 (1st ed.); April 9, 2003 (2nd ed.); 978-1-56931-262-9 (1st ed.); 978-1-56931-947-5 (2nd ed.)
2	Family Matters	June 18, 1997; 4-09-125202-8	December 6, 1998 (1st ed.); April 9, 2003 (2nd ed.); 978-1-56931-298-8 (1st ed.); 978-1-56931-948-2 (2nd ed.)
3	Good Intentions	October 18, 1997; 4-09-125203-6	May 6, 1999 (1st ed.); July 9, 2003 (2nd ed.); 978-1-56931-340-4 (1st ed.); 978-1-56931-960-4 (2nd ed.)
4	Lost and Alone	December 10, 1997; 4-09-125204-4	May 6, 1999 (1st ed.); July 9, 2003 (2nd ed.); 978-1-56931-368-8 (1st ed.); 978-1-56931-961-1 (2nd ed.)
5	Flesh and Bone	March 18, 1998; 4-09-125205-2	January 5, 2000 (1st ed.); October 1, 2003 (2nd ed.); 978-1-56931-433-3 (1st ed.); 978-1-59116-052-6 (2nd ed.)
6	Wounded Souls	May 18, 1998; 4-09-125206-0	May 1, 2000 (1st ed.); October 1, 2003 (2nd ed.); 978-1-56931-491-3 (1st ed.); 978-1-59116-053-3 (2nd ed.)
7	Close Enemies	August 8, 1998; 4-09-125207-9	October 30, 2000 (1st ed.); December 24, 2003 (2nd ed.); 978-1-56931-539-2 (1st ed.); 978-1-59116-114-1 (2nd ed.)
8	Stolen Spirit	November 18, 1998; 4-09-125208-7	July 6, 2001 (1st ed.); December 24, 2003 (2nd ed.); 978-1-56931-553-8 (1st ed.); 978-1-59116-115-8 (2nd ed.)
9	Building a Better Trap	January 18, 1999; 4-09-125209-5	October 10, 2001 (1st ed.); April 7, 2004 (2nd ed.); 978-1-56931-643-6 (1st ed.); 978-1-59116-236-0 (2nd ed.)
10	A Warrior's Code	April 17, 1999; 4-09-125210-9	January 9, 2002 (1st ed.); April 7, 2004 (2nd ed.); 978-1-56931-703-7 (1st ed.); 978-1-59116-237-7 (2nd ed.)
11	Scars of the Past	July 17, 1999; 4-09-125581-7	July 6, 2002 (1st ed.); June 23, 2004 (2nd ed.); 978-1-59116-022-9 (1st ed.); 978-1-59116-332-9 (2nd ed.)
12	Trials and Traps	September 18, 1999; 4-09-125582-5	October 6, 2002 (1st ed.); June 30, 2004 (2nd ed.); 978-1-59116-023-6 (1st ed.); 978-1-59116-333-6 (2nd ed.)
13	The Mind's Eye	November 18, 1999; 4-09-125583-3	April 9, 2003; 978-1-56931-808-9
14	Gray Areas	February 18, 2000; 4-09-125584-1	June 11, 2003; 978-1-56931-886-7
15	Feminine Wiles	April 18, 2000; 4-09-125585-X	October 15, 2003; 978-1-56931-999-4
16	Mirror Image	June 17, 2000; 4-09-125586-8	December 31, 2003; 978-1-59116-113-4
17	A Savage Cut	August 9, 2000; 4-09-125587-6	April 7, 2004; 978-1-59116-238-4
18	Love and Lust	October 18, 2000; 4-09-125588-4	July 7, 2004; 978-1-59116-331-2
19	Target: Kagome!	January 18, 2001; 4-09-125589-2	September 7, 2004; 978-1-59116-678-8
20	Shards of Evil?	March 17, 2001; 4-09-125590-6	January 4, 2005; 978-1-59116-626-9

=== Volumes 21–40 ===
No.	Title	Original release date	English release date
21	Yet Another Naraku	June 18, 2001; 4-09-125641-4	April 12, 2005; 978-1-59116-740-2
22	Cast-Off Heart	August 9, 2001; 4-09-125642-2	July 12, 2005; 978-1-59116-840-9
23	Two Brothers, One Enemy	November 17, 2001; 4-09-125643-0	September 4, 2005; 978-1-4215-0024-9
24	Liars and Ogres and Monkeys...Oh, My!	December 18, 2001; 4-09-125644-9	January 17, 2006; 978-1-4215-0186-4
25	The Battle with the Band of Seven Rages On!	March 18, 2002; 4-09-125645-7	April 18, 2006; 978-1-4215-0383-7
26	The Sacred Mountain	June 18, 2002; 4-09-125646-5	July 18, 2006; 978-1-4215-0466-7
27	The Unlikely Allies	September 18, 2002; 4-09-125647-3	October 17, 2006; 978-1-4215-0467-4
28	The Rebirth of Naraku	December 5, 2002; 4-09-125648-1	January 9, 2007; 978-1-4215-0468-1
29	Naraku's Perfect New Form	March 18, 2003; 4-09-125649-X	April 10, 2007; 978-1-4215-0900-6
30	A Hideous Demon Baby's Mission	May 17, 2003; 4-09-125650-3	July 10, 2007; 978-1-4215-0901-3
31	The Demon of the Birds	July 18, 2003; 4-09-126661-4	October 9, 2007; 978-1-4215-0902-0
32	River of Blood	September 18, 2003; 4-09-126662-2	January 8, 2008; 978-1-4215-1522-9
33	Allies and Enemies	December 5, 2003; 4-09-126663-0	April 8, 2008; 978-1-4215-1828-2
34	A Mountain That Lives	February 18, 2004; 4-09-126664-9	July 8, 2008; 978-1-4215-1829-9
35	Almost Human	May 18, 2004; 4-09-126665-7	October 14, 2008; 978-1-4215-1830-5
36	A Question of Time	July 16, 2004; 4-09-126666-5	January 13, 2009; 978-1-4215-2218-0
37	A Question of Time	September 17, 2004; 4-09-126667-3	April 14, 2009; 978-1-4215-2219-7
38	A Heart in the Hand	December 10, 2004; 4-09-126668-1	July 14, 2009; 978-1-4215-2220-3
39	The Struggle Continues	February 18, 2005; 4-09-126669-X	August 11, 2009; 978-1-4215-2221-0
40	The Fate of a Sword	May 18, 2005; 4-09-126670-3	September 8, 2009; 978-1-4215-2890-8

=== Volumes 41–56 ===
No.	Title	Original release date	English release date
41	Armor of a Demon	August 8, 2005; 4-09-127321-1	October 13, 2009; 978-1-4215-2891-5
42	Mixed Messages	October 18, 2005; 4-09-127322-X	November 10, 2009; 978-1-4215-2892-2
43	Demon Swamp	December 15, 2005; 4-09-127323-8	December 8, 2009; 978-1-4215-2893-9
44	Call of the Wolf Clan	February 17, 2006; 4-09-120088-5	January 12, 2010; 978-1-4215-2994-3
45	Triple Threat	May 18, 2006; 4-09-120350-7	February 9, 2010; 978-1-4215-2995-0
46	Lost Love	July 18, 2006; 4-09-120558-5	March 9, 2010; 978-1-4215-2996-7
47	Yin and Yang	November 17, 2006; 4-09-120680-8	April 13, 2010; 978-1-4215-2997-4
48	Feeding Frenzy	January 13, 2007; 4-09-120810-X	May 11, 2010; 978-1-4215-2998-1
49	Down to the Bone	April 18, 2007; 4-09-121027-9	June 8, 2010; 978-1-4215-2999-8
50	Green Monster	July 18, 2007; 4-09-121156-9	July 13, 2010; 978-1-4215-3000-0
51	Outfoxed	October 18, 2007; 4-09-121198-4	August 10, 2010; 978-1-4215-3001-7
52	Transformations	January 18, 2008; 4-09-121267-0	September 14, 2010; 978-1-4215-3002-4
53	Direct Attack	April 18, 2008; 4-09-121339-1	October 12, 2010; 978-1-4215-3003-1
54	United Front	July 11, 2008; 4-09-121428-2	November 9, 2010; 978-1-4215-3004-8
55	Power of the Jewel	October 17, 2008; 4-09-121480-0	December 14, 2010; 978-1-4215-3005-5
56	Curtain of Time	February 18, 2009; 4-09-121580-7	January 11, 2011; 978-1-4215-3299-8

=== VizBig edition ===
No.	Release date	ISBN
1	November 10, 2009	978-1-4215-3280-6
2	February 9, 2010	978-1-4215-3281-3
3	May 11, 2010	978-1-4215-3282-0
4	August 10, 2010	978-1-4215-3283-7
5	November 9, 2010	978-1-4215-3284-4
6	February 8, 2011	978-1-4215-3285-1
7	May 10, 2011	978-1-4215-3286-8
8	August 9, 2011	978-1-4215-3287-5
9	November 8, 2011	978-1-4215-3288-2
10	February 14, 2012	978-1-4215-3289-9
11	May 8, 2012	978-1-4215-3290-5
12	August 14, 2012	978-1-4215-3291-2
13	November 13, 2012	978-1-4215-3292-9
14	February 12, 2013	978-1-4215-3293-6
15	May 14, 2013	978-1-4215-3294-3
16	August 13, 2013	978-1-4215-3295-0
17	November 12, 2013	978-1-4215-3296-7
18	February 11, 2014	978-1-4215-3297-4
