= List of Chi's Sweet Home chapters =

The cover of Chi's Sweet Home volume 1 as released by Kodansha on November 22, 2004 in Japan

This is a list of chapters of the manga series Chi's Sweet Home (チーズスイートホーム, Chīzu Suīto Hōmu) by Konami Kanata. It was serialized in Kodansha's seinen manga magazine Weekly Morning from 2004 to 2015. The manga is about a lost kitten Chi (チー) who is taken in by a family of three.

Kodansha published the first tankōbon on November 22, 2004 and did so annually until the final 12th volume was published on June 23, 2015.

== Volume list ==
No.	Original release date	Original ISBN	English release date	English ISBN
1	November 22, 2004	978-4-06-334943-6	June 29, 2010	978-1-934287-81-1
Homemade 1. "A Cat is Lost" (猫、迷子になる。, Neko, maigo ni naru.); Homemade 2. "A Cat is Found" (猫、拾われる。, Neko, hirowareru.); Homemade 3. "A Cat is Given a Hard Time" (猫、ひどい目にあう。, Neko, hidoi me ni au.); Homemade 4. "A Cat Forgets" (猫、忘れる。, Neko, wasureru.); Homemade 5. "A Cat Begins" (猫、始める。, Neko, hajimeru.); Homemade 6. "A Cat is Disappointed" (猫、がっかりする。, Neko, gakkari suru.); Homemade 7. "A Cat Understands" (猫、理解する。, Neko, rikai suru.); Homemade 8. "A Cat Remembers" (猫、思い出す。, Neko, omoidasu.); Homemade 9. "A Cat Dreams" (猫、夢を見る。, Neko, yume o miru.); Homemade 10. "A Cat is Fired Up" (猫、興奮する。, Neko, koufun suru.); Homemade 11. "A Cat Plays" (猫、遊ぶ。, Neko, asobu.); Homemade 12. "A Cat is Lost... Again" (猫、再び迷子になる。, Neko, futatabi maigo ni naru.); Homemade 13. "A Cat Fights!" (猫、けんかする。, Neko, kenka suru.); Homemade 14. "A Cat Goes to the Vet (Part 1)" (猫、病院に行く。(前編), Neko, byouin ni iku. (Zenpen)); Homemade 15. "A Cat Goes to the Vet (Part 2)" (猫、病院に行く。(後編), Neko, byouin ni iku. (Kouhen)); Homemade 16. "A Cat Fears" (猫、嫌がる。, Neko, iyagaru.); Homemade 17. "A Cat Discovers" (猫、見つける。, Neko, mitsukeru.); Homemade 18. "A Cat is Discovered" (猫、見つけられる。, Neko, mitsukerareru.); Homemade 19. "A Cat Obsesses" (猫、こだわる。, Neko, kodawaru.); Homemade 20. "A Cat is Home Alone" (猫、留守番する。, Neko, rusuban suru.)
2	August 23, 2005	978-4-06-372050-1	August 24, 2010	978-1-934287-85-9
Homemade 21. "A Cat is Moved" (猫、感動する。, Neko, kandou suru.); Homemade 22. "A Cat Takes a Bath" (猫、お風呂に入る。, Neko, ofuro ni hairu.); Homemade 23. "A Cat Throws Down" (猫、対決する。, Neko, taiketsu suru.); Homemade 24. "A Cat Asserts Itself" (猫、主張する。, Neko, shuchou suru.); Homemade 25. "A Cat Stands Firm" (猫、固まる。, Neko, katamaru.); Homemade 26. "A Cat Encounters" (猫、出会う。, Neko, deau.); Homemade 27. "A Cat Intrudes" (猫、邪魔する。, Neko, jama suru.); Homemade 28. "A Cat is Robbed" (猫、食べられる。, Neko, taberareru.); Homemade 29. "A Cat is Considers" (猫、窺う。, Neko, ukagau.); Homemade 30. "A Cat Reports" (猫、報告する。, Neko, houkoku suru.); Homemade 31. "A Cat Uses Her Head" (猫、頭を使う。, Neko, atama o tsukau.); Homemade 32. "A Cat Aggravates" (猫、困らせる。, Neko, komaraseru.); Homemade 33. "A Cat Searches" (猫、探す。, Neko, sagasu.); Homemade 34. "A Cat Stalks" (猫、追跡する。, Neko, tsuiseki suru.); Homemade 35. "A Cat Goes Home" (猫、お家に帰る。, Neko, oie ni kaeru.); Homemade 36. "A Cat Resists" (猫、反抗する。, Neko, hankou suru.); Homemade 37. "A Cat is Defiant" (猫、抵抗する。, Neko, teikou suru.); Homemade 38. "A Cat Sulks" (猫、いじける。, Neko, ijikeru.)
3	April 21, 2006	978-4-06-372141-6; ISBN 978-4-06-362055-9 (Limited Ed.)	October 26, 2010	978-1-934287-91-0
Homemade 39. "A Cat Mimics" (猫、真似する。, Neko, mane suru.); Homemade 40. "A Cat is Photographed" (猫、撮られる。, Neko, torareru.); Homemade 41. "A Cat is Taught" (猫、教わる。, Neko, osowaru.); Homemade 42. "A Cat Hides" (猫、隠れる。, Neko, kakureru.); Homemade 43. "A Cat Meditates" (猫、仲裁する。, Neko, chuusai suru.); Homemade 44. "A Cat is Attacked" (猫、襲撃される。, Neko, shuugeki sareru.); Homemade 45. "A Cat Gets Along" (猫、意気投合する。, Neko, ikitougou suru.); Homemade 46. "A Cat Learns" (猫、習う。, Neko, narau.); Homemade 47. "A Cat is Cornered" (猫、追い詰められる。, Neko, oitsumerareru.); Homemade 48. "A Cat Studies" (猫、学ぶ。, Neko, manabu.); Homemade 49. "A Cat Endeavors" (猫、励む。, Neko, hagemu.); Homemade 50. "A Cat Yearns" (猫、切望する。, Neko, setsubou suru.); Homemade 51. "A Cat Appeals" (猫、懇願する。, Neko, kongan suru.); Homemade 52. "A Cat Promises" (猫、約束する。, Neko, yakusoku suru.); Homemade 53. "A Cat Sends Off" (猫、見送る。, Neko, miokuru.); Homemade 54. "A Cat Finds Out" (猫、発見する。, Neko, hakken suru.); Homemade 55. "A Cat is Taken" (猫、連れて行かれる。, Neko, tsurete ikareru.); Homemade 56. "A Cat Runs Away" (猫、家出する。, Neko, iede suru.)
4	April 23, 2007	978-4-06-372286-4; ISBN 978-4-06-362079-5 (Limited Ed.)	December 21, 2010	978-1-934287-96-5
Homemade 57. "A Cat Prepares" (猫、準備する。, Neko, junbi suru.); Homemade 58. "A Cat Imagines" (猫、想像する。, Neko, souzou suru.); Homemade 59. "A Cat Moves" (猫、引っ越す。, Neko, hikkosu.); Homemade 60. "A Cat Sniffs" (猫、嗅ぐ。, Neko, kagu.); Homemade 61. "A Cat Cultivates" (猫、開拓する。, Neko, kaitaku suru.); Homemade 62. "A Cat Climbs" (猫、登る。, Neko, noboru.); Homemade 63. "A Cat Greets" (猫、挨拶する。, Neko, aisatsu suru.); Homemade 64. "A Cat Challenges" (猫、挑む。, Neko, idomu.); Homemade 65. "A Cat Worries" (猫、悩む。, Neko, nayamu.); Homemade 66. "A Cat is Mistaken" (猫、誤解する。, Neko, gokai suru.); Homemade 67. "A Cat Has Her Claws Trimmed" (猫、爪を切られる。, Neko, tsume o kirareru.); Homemade 68. "A Cat Joins In" (猫、囲む。, Neko, kakomu.); Homemade 69. "A Cat Plays in the Yard" (猫、庭で遊ぶ。, Neko, niwa de asobu.); Homemade 70. "A Cat Figures Out" (猫、発見する。, Neko, hakken suru.); Homemade 71. "A Cat Hides Out" (猫、隠す。, Neko, kakusu.); Homemade 72. "A Cat Hides Out Some More" (猫、もっと隠す。, Neko, motto kakusu.); Homemade 73. "A Cat is Sought" (猫、見つかる。, Neko, mitsukaru.); Homemade 74. "A Cat Chases" (猫、追う。, Neko, ou.)
5	April 23, 2008	978-4-06-375474-2; ISBN 978-4-06-362112-9 (Limited Ed.)	February 22, 2011	978-1-934287-13-2
Homemade 75. "A Cat Greets" (猫、迎える。, Neko, mukaeru.); Homemade 76. "A Cat Sleeps" (猫、寝る。, Neko, neru.); Homemade 77. "A Cat Investigates" (猫、調査する。, Neko, chousa suru.); Homemade 78. "A Cat Feigns Ignorance" (猫、知らんぷりする。, Neko, shiranpuri suru.); Homemade 79. "A Cat Contrives" (猫、発想する。, Neko, hassou suru.); Homemade 80. "A Cat is Brushed" (猫、ブラッシングされる。, Neko, burasshingu sareru.); Homemade 81. "A Cat Goes Out" (猫、外に出る。, Neko, soto ni deru.); Homemade 82. "A Cat is Thrilled" (猫、ワクワクする。, Neko, wakuwaku suru.); Homemade 83. "A Cat Explores" (猫、探索する。, Neko, tansaku suru.); Homemade 84. "A Cat Returns" (猫、戻る。, Neko, modoru.); Homemade 85. "A Cat is Invited" (猫、誘われる。, Neko, sasowareru.); Homemade 86. "A Cat Doesn't Mesh" (猫、噛み合わない。, Neko, kamiawanai.); Homemade 87. "A Cat Does Mesh" (猫、噛み合う。, Neko, kamiau.); Homemade 88. "A Cat Halts" (猫、足を止める。, Neko, ashi o tomeru.); Homemade 89. "A Cat Visits" (猫、たずねる。, Neko, tazuneru.); Homemade 90. "A Cat is Reacquainted" (猫、再会する。, Neko, saikai suru.); Homemade 91. "A Cat Receives Milk" (猫、ミルクをもらう。, Neko, miruku o morau.); Homemade 92. "A Cat is Directed Home" (猫、道案内する。, Neko, michiannai suru.)
6	April 23, 2009	978-4-06-375698-2; ISBN 978-4-06-362140-2 (Limited Ed.)	June 28, 2011	978-1-935654-14-8
Homemade 93. "A Cat Leaves Her Mark" (猫、跡をつける。, Neko, ato o tsukeru.); Homemade 94. "A Cat is Stopped" (猫、止められる。, Neko, tomerareru.); Homemade 95. "A Cat Battles" (猫、勝負する。, Neko, shoubu suru.); Homemade 96. "A Cat Appears" (猫、出没する。, Neko, shutsubotsu suru.); Homemade 97. "A Cat Beckons" (猫、誘う。, Neko, sasou.); Homemade 98. "A Cat is Satisfied" (猫、満足する。, Neko, manzoku suru.); Homemade 99. "A Cat is Pleased" (猫、喜ぶ。, Neko, yorokobu.); Homemade 100. "A Cat Celebrates" (猫、お祝いする。, Neko, oiwai suru.); Homemade 101. "A Cat Shares" (猫、伝わる。, Neko, tsutawaru.); Homemade 102. "A Cat is Sucked" (猫、吸われる。, Neko, suwareru.); Homemade 103. "A Cat Tosses" (猫、落とす。, Neko, otosu.); Homemade 104. "A Cat Peeks" (猫、のぞく。, Neko, nozoku.); Homemade 105. "A Cat Opens Her Heart" (猫、打ち解ける。, Neko, uchitokeru.); Homemade 106. "A Cat is Copied" (猫、真似される。, Neko, mane sareru.); Homemade 107. "A Cat Accepts" (猫、もらう。, Neko, morau.); Homemade 108. "A Cat Saunters" (猫、出かける。, Neko, dekakeru.); Homemade 109. "A Cat Continues to Saunter" (猫、さらに出かける。, Neko, sara ni dekakeru.); Homemade 110. "A Cat Steps Forward" (猫、踏み出す。, Neko, fumidasu.)
7	April 23, 2010	978-4-06-375907-5; ISBN 978-4-06-358317-5 (Limited Ed.)	October 18, 2011	978-1-935654-21-6
Homemade 111. "A Cat Tags Along" (猫、ついていく。, Neko, tsuite iku.); Homemade 112. "A Cat Over-Reaches" (猫、過信する。, Neko, kashin suru.); Homemade 113. "A Cat is Shut Out" (猫、隔てられる。, Neko, hedaterareru.); Homemade 114. "A Cat Comes Back" (猫、戻る。, Neko, modoru.); Homemade 115. "A Cat Gives Up" (猫、観念する。, Neko, kannen suru.); Homemade 116. "A Cat Observes" (猫、観る。, Neko, miru.); Homemade 117. "A Cat is Astounded" (猫、驚く。, Neko, odoroku.); Homemade 118. "A Cat's Heart is Stolen" (猫、心を奪われる。, Neko, kokoro o ubawareru.); Homemade 119. "A Cat Reaches" (猫、手を出す。, Neko, te o dasu.); Homemade 120. "A Cat Misunderstands" (猫、誤解する。, Neko, gokai suru.); Homemade 121. "A Cat is Cheesed" (猫、チーズする。, Neko, chiizu suru.); Homemade 122. "A Cat Feels a Presence" (猫、気配を感じる。, Neko, kehai o kanjiru.); Homemade 123. "A Cat Senses an Anomaly" (猫、異変を感じる。, Neko, ihen o kanjiru.); Homemade 124. "A Cat Takes Shelter from the Rain" (猫、雨宿りする。, Neko, amayadori suru.); Homemade 125. "A Cat Goes Halves" (猫、共有する。, Neko, kyouyuu suru.); Homemade 126. "A Cat Has an Emergency" (猫、急変する。, Neko, kyuuhen suru.); Homemade 127. "A Cat Vomits" (猫、吐く。, Neko, haku.); Homemade 128. "A Cat Hangs in There" (猫、頑張る。, Neko, ganbaru.)
8	April 22, 2011	978-4-06-376054-5; ISBN 978-4-06-362191-4 (Limited Ed.)	February 28, 2012	978-1-935654-35-3
Homemade 129. "A Cat Manifests" (猫、発揮する。, Neko, hakki suru.); Homemade 130. "A Cat Anticipates" (猫、期待する。, Neko, kitai suru.); Homemade 131. "A Cat Cases" (猫、調査する。, Neko, chousa suru.); Homemade 132. "A Cat is Wowed" (猫、ドキドキする。, Neko, dokidoki suru.); Homemade 133. "A Cat Has A Blast" (猫、ワクワクする。, Neko, wakuwaku suru.); Homemade 134. "A Cat is Pursued" (猫、追われる。, Neko, owareru.); Homemade 135. "A Cat is Hemmed" (猫、追いつめられる。, Neko, oitsumerareru.); Homemade 136. "A Cat Leaps" (猫、飛躍する。, Neko, hiyaku suru.); Homemade 137. "A Cat Returns" (猫、帰還する。, Neko, kikan suru.); Homemade 138. "A Cat Relaxes" (猫、くつろぐ。, Neko, kutsurogu.); Homemade 139. "A Cat Monitors" (猫、観察する。, Neko, kansatsu suru.); Homemade 140. "A Cat Steps Out" (猫、出かける。, Neko, dekakeru.); Homemade 141. "A Cat Infiltrates" (猫、潜入する。, Neko, sennyuu suru.); Homemade 142. "A Cat Judges" (猫、判断する。, Neko, handan suru.); Homemade 143. "A Cat Attempts" (猫、試す。, Neko, tamesu.); Homemade 144. "A Cat Concerns" (猫、心配される。, Neko, shinpai sareru.); Homemade 145. "A Cat Reconnects" (猫、つながる。, Neko, tsunagaru.); Homemade 146. "A Cat Sheds Tears" (猫、 涙が出る。, Neko, namida ga deru.)
9	April 23, 2012	978-4-063766-28-8	August 28, 2012	978-1-935654-42-1
Homemade 147. "A Cat Dislikes" (猫、嫌がる。, Neko, iyagaru.); Homemade 148. "A Cat Begs" (猫、頼む。, Neko, tanomu.); Homemade 149. "A Cat is Impatient" (猫、むがく。, Neko, mugaku.); Homemade 150. "A Cat is Crossed" (猫、すねる。, Neko, suneru.); Homemade 151. "A Cat Linked" (猫、つながれる。, Neko, tsunagareru.); Homemade 152. "A Cat Unleashed" (猫、ほどく。, Neko, hodoku.); Homemade 153. "A Cat Hurries" (猫、急ぐ。, Neko, isogu.); Homemade 154. "A Cat Waits" (猫、待つ。, Neko, matsu.); Homemade 155. "A Cat is Irritated" (猫、イラ立つ。, Neko, iratatsu.); Homemade 156. "A Cat is Misunderstood" (猫、誤解する。, Neko, gokai suru.); Homemade 157. "A Cat Yearns" (猫、 憧れる。, Neko, akogareru.); Homemade 158. "A Cat Appreciates" (猫、 弟子入りする。, Neko, deshiiri suru.); Homemade 159. "A Cat Practices" (猫、実践する。, Neko, jissen suru.); Homemade 160. "A Cat is Sleepy" (猫、眠い。, Neko, nemui.); Homemade 161. "A Cat is Hunted" (猫、探索される。, Neko, tansaku sareru.); Homemade 162. "A Cat is Exhausted" (猫、だつりょくする。, Neko, datsuryoku suru.); Homemade 163. "A Cat is the Same as ever" (猫、いつも通りにする。, Neko, itsumo doori ni suru.); Homemade 164. "A Cat Feels at Home" (猫、くつろぐ。, Neko, kutsurogu.)
10	April 23, 2013	978-4-06-376810-7; ISBN 978-4-06-362246-1 (Limited Ed.)	August 27, 2013	978-1-935654-69-8
Homemade 165. "A Cat Guides" (猫、案内する。, Neko, annai suru.); Homemade 166. "A Cat Feels Certain" (猫、確かめる。, Neko, tashikameru.); Homemade 167. "A Cat is Watched" (猫、見られる。, Neko, mirareru.); Homemade 168. "A Cat is Concerning" (猫、悩まれる。, Neko, nayamareru.); Homemade 169. "A Cat Communicates" (猫、通じ合う。, Neko, tsuujiau.); Homemade 170. "A Cat is Misread" (猫、誤解される。, Neko, gokai sareru.); Homemade 171. "A Cat Has Signals Crossed" (猫、食い違う。, Neko, kuichigau.); Homemade 172. "A Cat is Told" (猫、知らされる。, Neko, shirasareru.); Homemade 173. "A Cat Goes to See" (猫、見に行く。, Neko, mi ni iku.); Homemade 174. "A Cat Ponders" (猫、気にかかる。, Neko, ki ni kakaru.); Homemade 175. "A Cat Realizes" (猫、気付いてしまう。, Neko, kizuite shimau.); Homemade 176. "A Cat Queries" (猫、質問する。, Neko, shitsumon suru.); Homemade 177. "A Cat is Briefed" (猫、説明される。, Neko, setsumei sareru.); Homemade 178. "A Cat Trains" (猫、練習する。, Neko, renshuu suru.); Homemade 179. "A Cat Holds" (猫、待つ。, Neko, matsu.); Homemade 180. "A Cat Masters" (猫、習得する。, Neko, shuutoku suru.); Homemade 181. "A Cat Joins Up" (猫、集まる。, Neko, atsumaru.); Homemade 182. "A Cat Begins to Change" (猫、変わり始める。, Neko, kawari hajimeru.)
11	April 23, 2014	978-4063769685	August 19, 2014	978-1939130518
Homemade 183. "A Cat Calls" (猫、話しかける。, Neko, hanashikakeru.); Homemade 184. "A Cat is Distressed" (猫、困惑する。, Neko, konwaku suru.); Homemade 185. "A Cat is Feeling Gloomy" (猫、モヤモヤする。, Neko, moyamoya suru.); Homemade 186. "A Cat Receives a Shock" (猫、衝撃を受ける。, Neko, shougeki o ukeru.); Homemade 187. "A Cat is in Denial" (猫、否定する。, Neko, hitei suru.); Homemade 188. "A Cat Notices" (猫、気がつく。, Neko, ki ga tsuku.); Homemade 189. "A Cat Hangs Her Head" (猫、うなだれる。, Neko, unadareru.); Homemade 190. "A Cat is Called Upon" (猫、呼ばれる。, Neko, yobareru.); Homemade 191. "A Cat Becomes Sensitive" (猫、過敏になる。, Neko, kabin ni naru.); Homemade 192. "A Cat Communes" (猫、団欒する。, Neko, danran suru.); Homemade 193. "A Cat is Surprised" (猫、びっくりする。, Neko, bikkuri suru.); Homemade 194. "A Cat is Compelled" (猫、迫られる。, Neko, semarareru.); Homemade 195. "A Cat Recalls" (猫、記憶をたどる。, Neko, kioku o tadoru.); Homemade 196. "A Cat is Lost in Thought" (猫、思いに沈む。, Neko, omoi ni shizumu.); Homemade 197. "A Cat is Looked for" (猫、探される。, Neko, sagasareru.); Homemade 198. "A Cat is Rejected" (猫、拒絶される。, Neko, kyozetsu sareru.); Homemade 199. "A Cat is Irritable" (猫、カリカリする。, Neko, karikari suru.); Homemade 200. "A Cat Has a Chance Meeting" (猫、邂逅する。, Neko, kaikou suru.)
12	June 23, 2015	978-4063771763	November 3, 2015	978-1941220252
Homemade 201. "A Cat Chases Her Memories" (猫、記憶をたどる。, Neko, kioku o tadoru.); Homemade 202. "A Cat's Spirits Lift" (猫、機嫌がよくなる。, Neko, kigen ga yokunaru.); Homemade 203. "A Cat Meets Trouble" (猫、危機にあう。, Neko, kiki ni au.); Homemade 204. "A Cat Runs" (猫、走る。, Neko, hashiru.); Homemade 205. "A Cat Helps" (猫、助ける。, Neko, tasukeru.); Homemade 206. "A Cat Snuggles" (猫、寄り添う。, Neko, yorisou.); Homemade 207. "A Cat Bonds" (猫、なつく。, Neko, natsuku.); Homemade 208. "A Cat Goes Back" (猫、戻る。, Neko, modoru.); Homemade 209. "A Cat Accepts" (猫、受け入れる。, Neko, ukeireru.); Homemade 210. "A Cat Fits in" (猫、とけ込む。, Neko, tokekomu.); Homemade 211. "A Cat Separates" (猫、別れる。, Neko, wakareru.); Homemade 212. "A Cat Confirms" (猫、判明する。, Neko, hanmei suru.); Homemade 213. "A Cat Has to Pick" (猫、突きつけられる。, Neko, tsukitsukerareru.); Homemade 214. "A Cat Makes up Her Mind" (猫、決心する。, Neko, kesshin suru.); Homemade 215. "A Cat Runs Off" (猫、走り出す。, Neko, hashiridasu.); Homemade 216. "A Cat Continues to Run" (猫、走り続ける。, Neko, hashiritsuzukeru.); Homemade 217. "A Cat Dwells" (猫、思い続ける。, Neko, omoitsuzukeru.); Homemade 218. "A Cat Comes Home" (猫、帰る。, Neko, kaeru.)
