= The New York Times Manga Best Sellers of 2009 =

The first year of the Best Seller list saw 55 manga titles and one light novel title make their appearances. Of these, eight titles reached the top of the weekly list (in order of number of weeks at the top of the list, from highest to lowest): Naruto, 18 weeks; Bleach, 9 weeks; Vampire Knight, 7 weeks; Fruits Basket, 4 weeks; Negima!, 3 weeks; Chibi Vampire, 1 week; Fullmetal Alchemist, 1 week; and Warriors: Ravenpaw's Path, 1 week. Naruto and Warriors: Ravenpaw's Path were the only two titles to reach the top rank on the week of their debut.

The Best Seller list debuted at a time when the release schedule of Naruto was being accelerated; its releases occupied a majority of the first weekly top ten rankings. Junjo Romantica became the first yaoi (boys' love) title to enter the Best Seller list when it debuted in week 28. Death Note's L: Change the World became the first light novel to enter the top ten rankings in week 43. Adam Kepler noted that vampire literature had become popular over the previous year, and he featured Vampire Knight in the introduction to the week 46 list. It was the first manga title to be featured in the introduction which accompanies list.

Week	Sales rank^{[Legend]}										Refs.
Week	1	2	3	4	5	6	7	8	9	10	Refs.
9	Naruto, vol. 38	Naruto, vol. 40	Naruto, vol. 39	Naruto, vol. 41	MPD Psycho, vol. 8	Naruto, vol. 37	Naruto, vol. 35	Naruto, vol. 36	Naruto, vol. 34	Eden, vol. 11	
10	Naruto, vol. 40	Naruto, vol. 41	Naruto, vol. 38	Naruto, vol. 39	Bleach, vol. 26	Naruto, vol. 37	Naruto, vol. 35	Gentlemen's Alliance, vol. 9	Black Cat, vol. 19	Naruto, vol. 36	
11	Naruto, vol. 41	Naruto, vol. 40	Naruto, vol. 39	Naruto, vol. 38	Fruits Basket, vol. 22	Bleach, vol. 26	Vampire Knight, vol. 6	Rosario + Vampire, vol. 6	Code Geass, vol. 3	Naruto, vol. 37	
12	Fruits Basket, vol. 22	Naruto, vol. 41	Naruto, vol. 36	Naruto, vol. 40	Naruto, vol. 39	Naruto, vol. 38	Vampire Knight, vol. 6	Warcraft: Legends, vol. 3	Naruto, vol. 43	Tsubasa: Those with Wings, vol. 1	
13	Fruits Basket, vol. 22	Naruto, vol. 41	Naruto, vol. 40	Naruto, vol. 43	Naruto, vol. 42	Negima!, vol. 21	Naruto, vol. 38	Naruto, vol. 39	Vampire Knight, vol. 6	Bleach, vol. 26	
14	Naruto, vol. 43	Naruto, vol. 42	Naruto, vol. 44	Negima!, vol. 21	Negima!? neo, vol. 1	xxxHolic, vol. 13	Naruto, vol. 41	Fruits Basket, vol. 22	Naruto, vol. 40	Naruto, vol. 39	
15	Naruto, vol. 43	Naruto, vol. 44	Naruto, vol. 42	Vampire Knight, vol. 6	Naruto, vol. 41	Naruto, vol. 40	Fruits Basket, vol. 22	Gantz, vol. 4	Rosario + Vampire, vol. 6	Naruto, vol. 39	
16	Naruto, vol. 44	Naruto, vol. 42	Naruto, vol. 43	Naruto, vol. 31	Naruto, vol. 41	Naruto, vol. 40	Chibi Vampire, vol. 13	Fruits Basket, vol. 22	Naruto, vol. 39	Vampire Knight, vol. 6	
17	Naruto, vol. 43	Naruto, vol. 44	Naruto, vol. 42	Naruto, vol. 41	Naruto, vol. 40	Chibi Vampire, vol. 13	Fruits Basket, vol. 22	Naruto, vol. 39	Vampire Knight, vol. 6	Naruto, vol. 38	
18	Naruto, vol. 44	Naruto, vol. 43	Naruto, vol. 42	Naruto, vol. 41	Naruto, vol. 40	Fruits Basket, vol. 22	Naruto, vol. 39	Naruto, vol. 38	Vampire Knight, vol. 6	Chibi Vampire, vol. 13	
19	Naruto, vol. 44	Naruto, vol. 43	Naruto, vol. 42	D.Gray-man, vol. 13	Naruto, vol. 41	Black Cat, vol. 20	Skip Beat!, vol. 18	Naruto, vol. 40	Fruits Basket, vol. 22	Otomen, vol. 2	
20	Naruto, vol. 44	Naruto, vol. 43	Naruto, vol. 42	Return to Labyrinth, vol. 3	Fullmetal Alchemist, vol. 18	Naruto, vol. 40	D.Gray-man, vol. 13	Naruto, vol. 41	Otomen, vol. 2	Black Cat, vol. 20	
21	Negima!, vol. 22	Fullmetal Alchemist, vol. 18	Naruto, vol. 44	Naruto, vol. 43	Naruto, vol. 42	Naruto, vol. 40	Naruto, vol. 41	Otomen, vol. 2	Fruits Basket, vol. 22	Vampire Knight, vol. 6	
22	Negima!, vol. 22	Fullmetal Alchemist, vol. 18	Naruto, vol. 44	Naruto, vol. 43	Tsubasa: Reservoir Chronicle, vol. 21	Naruto, vol. 42	Naruto, vol. 40	Naruto, vol. 41	Fruits Basket, vol. 22	Naruto, vol. 38	
23	Bleach, vol. 27	Rosario + Vampire, vol. 7	Ouran High School Host Club, vol. 12	Naruto, vol. 43	Naruto, vol. 44	Fullmetal Alchemist, vol. 18	Negima!, vol. 22	Naruto, vol. 42	Yu-Gi-Oh! GX, vol. 3	One Piece, vol. 21	
24	Bleach, vol. 27	Warriors: Tigerstar and Sasha, vol. 3	Rosario + Vampire, vol. 7	Naruto, vol. 43	Naruto, vol. 44	Ouran High School Host Club, vol. 12	Naruto, vol. 42	Yu-Gi-Oh! GX, vol. 3	Fullmetal Alchemist, vol. 18	One Piece, vol. 21	
25	Bleach, vol. 27	Naruto, vol. 43	Naruto, vol. 44	Rosario + Vampire, vol. 7	Naruto, vol. 42	Ouran High School Host Club, vol. 12	Negima!, vol. 22	Tsubasa: Reservoir Chronicle, vol. 21	The Melancholy of Haruhi Suzumiya, vol. 3	Fullmetal Alchemist, vol. 18	
26	Bleach, vol. 27	Naruto, vol. 43	Naruto, vol. 44	Negima!, vol. 22	Ouran High School Host Club, vol. 12	Rosario + Vampire, vol. 7	The Melancholy of Haruhi Suzumiya, vol. 3	Naruto, vol. 42	Fullmetal Alchemist, vol. 18	Yu-Gi-Oh! GX, vol. 3	
27	Naruto, vol. 45	Fruits Basket, vol. 23	Naruto, vol. 43	Naruto, vol. 44	Bleach, vol. 27	Naruto, vol. 42	Negima!? neo, vol. 2	The Melancholy of Haruhi Suzumiya, vol. 3	Ouran High School Host Club, vol. 12	Lucky Star, vol. 1	
28	Naruto, vol. 45	Fruits Basket, vol. 23	Negima!, vol. 23	The Dark-Hunters, vol. 1	Tsubasa: Reservoir Chronicle, vol. 22	Junjo Romantica, vol. 10	Kitchen Princess, vol. 10	Naruto, vol. 43	Bleach, vol. 27	Captive Hearts, vol. 5	
29	Fruits Basket, vol. 23	Naruto, vol. 45	Negima!, vol. 23	Tsubasa: Reservoir Chronicle, vol. 22	Fullmetal Alchemist, vol. 19	Naruto, vol. 43	The Dark-Hunters, vol. 1	Kitchen Princess, vol. 10	InuYasha, vol. 38	Bleach, vol. 27	
30	Fruits Basket, vol. 23	Naruto, vol. 45	Fullmetal Alchemist, vol. 19	Negima!, vol. 23	Naruto, vol. 43	Tsubasa: Reservoir Chronicle, vol. 22	Naruto, vol. 44	Kitchen Princess, vol. 10	Lucky Star, vol. 1	Naruto, vol. 42	
31	Naruto, vol. 45	Fruits Basket, vol. 23	Fullmetal Alchemist, vol. 19	Vampire Knight, vol. 7	Rosario + Vampire, vol. 8	Negima!, vol. 23	D.N.Angel, vol. 12	Naruto, vol. 43	Air Gear, vol. 13	Tsubasa: Reservoir Chronicle, vol. 22	
32	Vampire Knight, vol. 7	Rosario + Vampire, vol. 8	Naruto, vol. 45	Fruits Basket, vol. 23	D.Gray-man, vol. 14	D.N.Angel, vol. 12	Otomen, vol. 3	Fullmetal Alchemist, vol. 19	Black Bird, vol. 1	Bloody Kiss, vol. 1	
33	Vampire Knight, vol. 7	Naruto, vol. 45	Rosario + Vampire, vol. 8	Fruits Basket, vol. 23	D.N.Angel, vol. 12	Black Bird, vol. 1	D.Gray-man, vol. 14	Fullmetal Alchemist, vol. 19	Otomen, vol. 3	Dogs: Bullets & Carnage, vol. 1	
34	Vampire Knight, vol. 7	Naruto, vol. 45	Fruits Basket, vol. 23	Rosario + Vampire, vol. 8	Black Bird, vol. 1	D.N.Angel, vol. 12	D.Gray-man, vol. 14	Dogs: Bullets & Carnage, vol. 1	Fullmetal Alchemist, vol. 19	Otomen, vol. 3	
35	Vampire Knight, vol. 7	Naruto, vol. 45	Fruits Basket, vol. 23	Black Bird, vol. 1	Rosario + Vampire, vol. 8	Ninja Girls, vol. 1	Sayonara, Zetsubou-Sensei, vol. 3	D.N.Angel, vol. 12	Fullmetal Alchemist, vol. 19	D.Gray-man, vol. 14	
36	Bleach, vol. 28	Vampire Knight, vol. 7	Naruto, vol. 45	Fruits Basket, vol. 23	Rosario + Vampire, vol. 8	Black Bird, vol. 1	Shaman King, vol. 24	Ninja Girls, vol. 1	D.N.Angel, vol. 12	S · A, vol. 12	
37	Bleach, vol. 28	Naruto, vol. 45	Vampire Knight, vol. 7	Fruits Basket, vol. 23	Black Bird, vol. 1	Naruto, vol. 43	Rosario + Vampire, vol. 8	Tegami Bachi, vol. 1	D.N.Angel, vol. 12	InuYasha, vol. 40	
38	Bleach, vol. 28	Naruto, vol. 45	Yotsuba&!, vol. 6	.hack//G.U.+, vol. 5	Fullmetal Alchemist, vol. 20	Vampire Knight, vol. 7	Fruits Basket, vol. 23	Higurashi When They Cry, Cotton Drifting Arc vol. 2	Black Bird, vol. 1	Naruto, vol. 43	
39	Fullmetal Alchemist, vol. 20	Bleach, vol. 28	Yotsuba&!, vol. 6	Chibi Vampire, vol. 14	Naruto, vol. 45	Vampire Knight, vol. 7	Naruto, vol. 43	Black Bird, vol. 1	Vampire Kisses, vol. 3	Fruits Basket, vol. 23	
40	Chibi Vampire, vol. 14	Vampire Kisses, vol. 3	Naruto, vol. 46	Fullmetal Alchemist, vol. 20	Naruto, vol. 45	Bleach, vol. 28	Shugo Chara!, vol. 7	Yotsuba&!, vol. 6	Negima!? neo, vol. 3	Vampire Knight, vol. 7	
41	Naruto, vol. 46	Rosario + Vampire, vol. 9	Chibi Vampire, vol. 14	Fullmetal Alchemist, vol. 20	Vampire Kisses, vol. 3	Skip Beat!, vol. 19	One Piece, vol. 22	Shugo Chara!, vol. 7	Wild Ones, vol. 8	Yotsuba&!, vol. 6	
42	Naruto, vol. 46	Rosario + Vampire, vol. 9	Yu-Gi-Oh! R, vol. 1	Chibi Vampire, vol. 14	Vampire Kisses, vol. 3	Fullmetal Alchemist, vol. 20	Skip Beat!, vol. 19	Battle Angel Alita: Last Order, vol. 12	Bleach, vol. 28	One Piece, vol. 22	
43	Naruto, vol. 46	Rosario + Vampire, vol. 9	Soul Eater, vol. 1	Death Note, L: Change the World^{[LN]}	Yu-Gi-Oh! R, vol. 1	Fullmetal Alchemist, vol. 20	Chibi Vampire, vol. 14	Vampire Kisses, vol. 3	Gentlemen's Alliance, vol. 10	Bleach, vol. 28	
44	Negima!, vol. 24	Naruto, vol. 46	Tsubasa: Reservoir Chronicle, vol. 23	xxxHolic, vol. 14	Maximum Ride, vol. 2	Soul Eater, vol. 1	Death Note, L: Change the World^{[LN]}	Tsubasa: Reservoir Chronicle, vol. 24	Rosario + Vampire, vol. 9	Yu-Gi-Oh! R, vol. 1	
45	Vampire Knight, vol. 8	Naruto, vol. 46	Negima!, vol. 24	Ouran High School Host Club, vol. 13	Black Bird, vol. 2	Maximum Ride, vol. 2	Rosario + Vampire, vol. 10	Soul Eater, vol. 1	D.Gray-man, vol. 15	Tsubasa: Reservoir Chronicle, vol. 24	
46	Vampire Knight, vol. 8	Naruto, vol. 46	Ouran High School Host Club, vol. 13	Black Bird, vol. 2	Maximum Ride, vol. 2	Rosario + Vampire, vol. 10	Negima!, vol. 24	Soul Eater, vol. 1	D.Gray-man, vol. 15	Tsubasa: Reservoir Chronicle, vol. 24	
47	Vampire Knight, vol. 8	Fullmetal Alchemist, vol. 21	Naruto, vol. 46	Maximum Ride, vol. 2	Rosario + Vampire, vol. 10	Ouran High School Host Club, vol. 13	Black Bird, vol. 2	Soul Eater, vol. 1	Negima!, vol. 24	Death Note, L: Change the World^{[LN]}	
48	Warriors: Ravenpaw's Path, vol. 1	Vampire Knight, vol. 8	Naruto, vol. 46	Fullmetal Alchemist, vol. 21	Maximum Ride, vol. 2	Ouran High School Host Club, vol. 13	Rosario + Vampire, vol. 10	Death Note, L: Change the World^{[LN]}	Black Bird, vol. 2	Soul Eater, vol. 1	
49	Bleach, vol. 29	Vampire Knight, vol. 8	Rosario + Vampire, vol. 10	Fullmetal Alchemist, vol. 21	Naruto, vol. 46	Maximum Ride, vol. 2	One Piece, vol. 23	Yu-Gi-Oh! R, vol. 2	D.N.Angel, vol. 13	Death Note, L: Change the World^{[LN]}	
50	Bleach, vol. 29	Vampire Knight, vol. 8	Naruto, vol. 46	Maximum Ride, vol. 2	Death Note, L: Change the World^{[LN]}	Maximum Ride, vol. 1	D.N.Angel, vol. 13	Fullmetal Alchemist, vol. 21	Soul Eater, vol. 1	One Piece, vol. 23	
51	Naruto, vol. 46	Bleach, vol. 29	Vampire Knight, vol. 8	Maximum Ride, vol. 2	Maximum Ride, vol. 1	Death Note, L: Change the World^{[LN]}	Fullmetal Alchemist, vol. 21	Soul Eater, vol. 1	Yotsuba&!, vol. 7	D.N.Angel, vol. 13	
52	Naruto, vol. 46	Vampire Knight, vol. 8	Maximum Ride, vol. 2	Maximum Ride, vol. 1	Death Note, L: Change the World^{[LN]}	Bleach, vol. 29	Soul Eater, vol. 1	Vampire Knight, vol. 7	Fullmetal Alchemist, vol. 21	Naruto, vol. 45	

Weeks are numbered according to the convention used in the United States, which labels the week containing January 1 as the first week of the year.

First appearance of a manga series title on the Best Seller list

First appearance of an individual manga release on the Best Seller list

^{FB} Fan book release

^{LN} Light novel release
