= List of Tegami Bachi chapters =

The manga series Tegami Bachi is written and illustrated by Hiroyuki Asada; the first ten chapters were published in the now-defunct Monthly Shōnen Jump. A special un-numbered chapter was published as a one-shot in Weekly Shōnen Jump prior to the launch of Jump Square, where Tegami Bachi was then serialized. Twenty tankōbon have been released, the first on January 4, 2007, and the last on January 4, 2016.

== Volumes list ==
No.	Title	Original release date	English release date
1	Letter and Letter Bee; Tegami to Tegamibachi (テガミとテガミバチ)	January 4, 2007; 978-4-08-874312-7	September 1, 2009; 978-1-4215-2913-4
1. "Letter and Letter Bee" (テガミとテガミバチ, "Tegami to Tegamibachi"); 2. "Crybaby Boy, Letter Girl" (泣き虫少年、テガミ少女, "Nakimushi shōnen, tegami shōjo")
2	The Letter to Jiggy Pepper; Jigī Peppā e no tegami (ジギー・ペッパーへの手紙)	June 4, 2007; 978-4-08-874374-5	March 2, 2010; 978-1-4215-2950-9
3. "The Letter to Jiggy Pepper, Part One" (ジギー・ペッパーへの手紙／前編, "Jigī Peppā e no tegami zenpen"); 4. "The Letter to Jiggy Pepper, Part Two" (ジギー・ペッパーへの手紙／中編, "Jigī Peppā e no tegami chūhen"); 5. "The Letter to Jiggy Pepper, Part Three" (ジギー・ペッパーへの手紙／後編, "Jigī Peppā e no tegami kōhen"); 6. "Beehive, 13 Nocturne Way, Central Yuusari" (ユウサリ中央 夜想道13番地 郵便館BEE-HIVE, "Yūsari Sentoraru Yasōmichi jūsanbanchi Yūbinkan Hachi no su"); 7. "Raspberry Hill" (ラズベリー・ヒル, "Razuberī Hiru")
3	Meeting with Sylvette Suede; Shirubetto Suēdo ni au (シルベット・スエードに会う)	February 4, 2008; 978-4-08-874483-4	September 7, 2010; 978-1-4215-2951-6
8. "Meeting with Sylvettte Suede" (シルベット・スエードに会う, "Shirubetto Suēdo ni au"); 9. "The Crybaby Boy's Vow" (泣き虫少年の誓い, "Nakimushi shōnen no chikai"); 10. "Beneath The Light" (光の下, "Hikari no shita"); Special Chapter: "Letter Bee and Dingo" (テガミバチとディンゴ, "Tegamibachi to dingo")
4	A Letter Full of Lies; Uso tegami (嘘テガミ)	April 2, 2008; 978-4-08-874517-6	February 1, 2011; 978-1-4215-2952-3
11. "A Letter Full of Lies" (嘘テガミ, "Uso tegami"); 12. "The Corpse Doctor" (死骸博士, "Shigai hakase"); 13. "Honey Waters" (ハニー・ウォーターズ, "Hanī Wōtāzu"); 14. "Undelivered Letters" (届かぬテガミ, "Todokanu tegami")
5	The Person Who Was Not Able To Become Spirits of the Dead; Seirei ni narenakattamono (精霊になれなかった者)	October 3, 2008; 978-4-08-874584-8	May 3, 2011; 978-1-4215-3180-9
15. "Memories of Three Hearts" (こころの記憶、三つ, "Kokoro no kioku, mittsu"); 16. "The Person Who Was Not Able To Become Spirits of the Dead" (精霊になれなかった者, "Seirei ni narenakattamono"); 17. "A Reunion, Tears, Tears, Tears" (再会、涙、涙、涙, "Saikai, namida, namida, namida"); 18. "Bread and Underpants" (パンツとパン, "Pantsu to pan")
6	Lighthouse of Illusions in the Wilderness; Kōya gen tōdai (荒野幻灯台)	February 4, 2009; 978-4-08-874636-4	August 2, 2011; 1-4215-3339-1
19. "The Hydrangea-coloured Picture Letter" (アジサイ色の絵テガミ, "Ajisaīro no e-tegami"); 20. "Lighthouse of Illusions in the Wilderness" (荒野幻灯台, "Kōya gen tōdai"); 21. "The Little Girl Doll" (少女人形, "Shōjo ningyō"); 22. "Film Noir"
7	Blue Notes Blues; Burū Nōtsu Burūsu (ブルー・ノーツ・ブルース)	June 4, 2009; 978-4-08-874678-4	November 1, 2011; 1-4215-3604-8
23. "Blue Notes Blues" (ブルー・ノーツ・ブルース, "Burū Nōtsu Burūsu"); 24. "Maka and Human" (摩訶と人, "Maka to hito"); 25. "200 Years of Loneliness" (ひとりぼっちの二百年, "Hitori botchi no ni hyaku nen"); 26. "Garden of Spirits" (精霊の庭, "Seirei no niwa")
8	Light, Illuminating The Darkness; Hikari, yami o terasu (光、闇を照らす)	October 2, 2009; 978-4-08-874743-9	February 7, 2012; 1-4215-3820-2
27. "Veritably Abbey" (ベリタブリィー修道院, "Beritaburī shūdōin"); 28. "Together, We Went On A Journey..." (二人、旅をした..., "Futari, tabi o shita..."); 29. "Light, Illuminating The Darkness" (光、闇を照らす, "Hikari, yami o terasu"); 30. "For Sure" (きっと, "Kitto")
9	The Cold Letter Division; Tōketsu Bukkenka (凍結物件課)	February 4, 2010; 978-4-08-870006-9	May 1, 2012; 1-4215-3821-0
31. "Return" (帰館, "Kikan"); 32. "Inspectors From The Capital" (首都監査人, "Shutokansanin"); 33. "The Cold Letter Division" (凍結物件課, "Tōketsu Bukkenka"); 34. "Love of Stone" (石の愛, "Ishi no ai")
10	The Shining Eye; Hikaru me (光る眼)	June 4, 2010; 978-4-08-870039-7	August 7, 2012; 1-4215-4145-9
35. "Aria and the Airship" (アリアと飛行船, "Aria to hikōsen"); 36. "Bolt the Brave" (勇者ボルト, "Yūsha Boruto"); 37. "Houdai Franklin" (ホーダイ・フランクリン, "Hōdai Furankurin"); 38. "The Shining Eye" (光る眼, "Hikaru me"); 39. "The Wolf Who Couldn't Become Spirit" (精霊になれなかった狼, "Seirei ni narenakatta ōkami")
11	A Bee's Bag; BEE no kaban (BEEの鞄)	October 4, 2010; 978-4-08-870120-2	November 6, 2012; 1-4215-4146-7
40. "Crossroad" (クロスロード, "Kurosurōdo"); 41. "A House to Return" (家に帰る, "Ie ni kaeru"); 42. "A Bee's Bag" (BEEの鞄, "BEE no kaban"); 43. "Deep Inside the Heart" (心、その奥に, "Kokoro, sono oku ni"); 44. "Silence and Pursuit" (静寂と追撃, "Seijaku to tsuigeki")
12	Child of the Light; Hikari no Ko (光の子)	April 21, 2011; 978-4-08-870198-1	February 5, 2013; 1-4215-4181-5
45. "Voices of the Heart" (心の声, "Kokoro no koe"); 46. "Approaching Threat" (迫る脅威, "Semaru kyoui"); 47. "Child of the Light" (光の子, "Hikari no Ko"); 48. "Lily Comfort" (リリー・コンフォート, "Rirī Confōto"); 49. "Parting and Reunion" (別れと再会, "Wakare to Saikai")
13	Area Mayfly; Kuiki Kagerou (区域カゲロウ)	November 4, 2011; 978-4-08-870334-3	May 7, 2013; 1-4215-5159-4
50. "The Laughing Gaichuu" (笑う鎧虫, "Warau Gaichū"); 51. "Reminiscence" (追懐, "Tsuikai"); 52. "Area Mayfly" (区域カゲロウ, "Kuiki Kagerou"); 53. "The Unforgiven" (許されざる者, "Yurusa Rezaru Mono"); 54. "Beacon" (狼煙, "Noroshi")
14	The Letter from the Mother; Haha kara no Tegami (母からのテガミ)	May 2, 2012; 978-4-08-870407-4	August 6, 2013; 1-4215-5160-8
55. "I Won't Let it Steal Them" (奪わせない, "Ubawasenai"); 56. "Shaken Heart" (こころ揺れて, "Kokoro yurete"); 57. "My Bigness is Big!" (大きさが大きい！, "Ookisa ga ookii!"); 58. "All Hearts as One" (こころ、 ひとつに, "Kokoro, hitotsu ni"); 59. "The Letter from the Mother" (母からのテガミ, "Haha kara no tegami")
15	To the Little Ones; Chiisaki-mono he (小さき者へ)	October 4, 2012; 978-4-08-870524-8	November 5, 2013; 1-4215-5616-2
60. "Bee Hive General Meeting" (ハチノス総会・ロングミーティング, "Hachinosu soukai, Rongu Miitingu"); 61. "Something not Human" (人ではない何か, "Hito deha nai nanika"); 62. "The Birth" (誕生, "Tanjō"); 63. "To the Little Ones" (小さき者へ, "Chiisaki-mono he"); 64. "The Agony of Coming into the World" (生まれ出づる悩み, "Umare idzuru nayami")
16	Wuthering Heights; Arashigaoka (嵐が丘)	June 4, 2013; 978-4-08-870636-8	March 4, 2014; 1-4215-6452-1
65. "Wuthering Heights" (嵐が丘, "Arashigaoka"); 66. "Wuthering Heights, Continued" (続・嵐が丘, "Zoku - Arashigaoka"); 67. "A Storm on Little Tree" (リトルツリー強撃, "Ritoru Tsurii Kyoushuu"); 68. "A Gentle Heart" (優しいこころ, "Yashii Kokoro"); 69. "An Empty Heart" (空っぽのこころ, "Karappo no Kokoro"); 70. "Name" (なまえ, "Namae")
17	Late Hire Chico; Tochuu Saiyou no Chiko (途中採用のチコ)	January 4, 2014; 978-4-08-870843-0	November 4, 2014; 978-1421575254
71. "The Revenge/Objective/Theory of Dr. Thunderland Jr. " (復習/目標/仮説(by Dr. Thunderland Jr.), "Fukushuu/Mokuhyou/Kasetsu"); 72. "Late Hire Chico" (途中採用のチコ, "Tochuu Saiyou no Chiko"); 73. "Don't Fear The Rain" (雨ニモマケズ, "Ame ni mo Makezu"); 74. "Shigeton's Animal Tale" (シゲトン動物記, "Shigeton Doubutsuki"); 75. "Capicaba King Ponta" (カピカバ王ぽんた, "Kapikaba-ou Ponta"); 76. "Capicaba King Ponta (Part II)" (続・カピカバ王ぽんた, "Zoku - Kapikaba-ou Ponta"); 77. "A Letter from Largo Lloyd" (ラルゴ・ロイドからのテガミ, "Rarugo Roido kara no tegami")
18	Zenryaku - Taisetsu-na Hito-tachi he (前略・大切な人達へ)	August 4, 2014; 978-4-08-880077-6	September 1, 2015; 978-1421579696
78. "The Place where it All Began" (始まりの場所, "Hajimari no Basho"); 79. "Revolutionary Étude" (革命のエチュード, "Kakumei no Echuudo"); 80. "The Last Spirit Insects" (最後の精霊虫, "Saigo no Seireichuu"); 81. "First Part Omitted - To my loved ones" (前略・大切な人達へ, "Zenryaku - Taisetsu-na Hito-tachi he"); 82. "The Entrusted Hope" (託された希望, "Takusareta Kibou"); 83. "Entrusting Hope" (託す希望, "Takusu Kibou"); 84. "The 358th day" (三百五十八日目, "Sanbyaku gojuu hachi nichi me")
19	Shuto Akatsuki (首都アカツキ)	April 3, 2015; 978-4-08-880229-9	June 7, 2016; 978-1421585161
85. "Return" (帰還, "Kikan"); 86. "Waltz for Debby" (ワルツ・フォー・デビイ, "Warutsu foo Debii"); 87. "Possibility of a New World" (新世界への可能性, "Shinsekai he no Kanousei"); 88. "Regarding Henry" (Regarding Henry, "Rigaadingu Henrii"); 89. "Song at Journey's Beginning" (旅立ちの詩, "Tabi-dachi no Uta"); 90. "Kuu-chan the Puma" (プマのクーちゃん, "Puma no Kuu-chan"); 91. "Akatsuki, the Capital" (首都アカツキ, "Shuto Akatsuki")
20	Shine; Shain (Shine)	January 4, 2016; 978-4-08-880506-1	March 7, 2017; 978-1421590462
92. "The Outcome of Truth" (真実の行方, "Shinjitsu no Yukue"); 93. "Head Bee" (ヘッド・ビー, "Heddo Bii"); 94. "Chance Meeting for Lloyd" (ロイド、邂逅, "Roido, Kaikou"); 95. "Good Bye" (さようなら, "Sayounara"); 96. "Memories of Days of Youth" (少年の日の思い出, "Shounen no Hi no Omoide"); 97. "Light Needle" (光針, "Hikaribari"); 98. "Heart" (こころ, "Kokoro"); 99. "Shine" (Shine, "Shain")
