= List of Battle Angel Alita chapters =

Cover of the first English volume

Battle Angel Alita, known in Japan as Gunnm (銃夢, Ganmu; a portmanteau of "gun" and "mu", the onyomi of the kanji for "dream"), is a manga series created by Yukito Kishiro in 1990 and originally published in Shueisha's Business Jump magazine.

The series is set in a post-apocalyptic future and focuses on Alita, a cyborg who has lost all memories and is found in a garbage heap by a cybernetics doctor who rebuilds and takes care of her. She discovers that there is one thing she remembers, the legendary cyborg martial art Panzer Kunst, which empowers her to become a Hunter Warrior, or bounty hunter. The story documents Alita's attempts to rediscover her past, as well as the characters whose lives she impacts on her journey. The series is continued in Last Order, Mars Chronicle and Panzer Kunst Chronicle.

== Volume list ==
=== Battle Angel Alita ===
==== Japanese volume list ====
| No. | Title | Japanese release date | Japanese ISBN |
|---|---|---|---|
| 1 | Rusty Angel (錆びた天使 Sabita Tenshi) | September 19, 1991 | 978-4-08-875071-2 |
Fight 1 "Rusty Angel" (錆びた天使, Sabita Tenshi); Fight 2 "Fight on Instinct" (戦いの血, Tatakai no Chi); Fight 3 "Only Value" (価値あるもの, Kachi Aru Mono); Fight 4 "Resurgents" (甦る狂戦士, Yomigaeru Bāsākā); Fight 5 "Sanctuary of Drain" (奈落の罠, Naraku no Wana); Fight 6 "Battle Angel" (戦う天使, Tatakau Tenshi)
| 2 | Iron Maiden (鋼鉄の処女 Kōtetsu no Shojo) | February 19, 1992 | 978-4-08-875072-9 |
Fight 7 "Tears Sign" (天使の涙, Tenshi no Namida); Fight 8 "Out of Blue Sky" (空を見た少年, Sora o Mita Shōnen); Fight 9 "Iron Maiden" (鋼鉄の処女, Kōtetsu no Shojo); Fight 10 "Rainy Days" (逃亡者ユーゴ, Tōbōsha Yūgo); Fight 11 "Guilty Dreams" (苦い夢, Nigai Yume)
| 3 | Killing Angel (殺戮の天使 Satsuriku no Enjeru) | July 17, 1992 | 978-4-08-875073-6 |
Fight 12 "Beyond the Sky" (雲の彼方, Kumo no Kanata); Fight 13 "Killing Angel" (殺戮の天使, Satsuriku no Enjeru); Fight 14 "The King of Kings" (帝王謁見, Teiō Ekken); Fight 15 "Work to Rule" (頭蓋骨勝負, Zugaikotsu Shōbu); Fight 16 "Risk One's Heart" (ハートはひとつ, Hāto wa Hitotsu); Fight 17 "Second Stage" (挑戦者への道, Chōsensha e no Michi)
| 4 | Ars Magna (炎の中に立つ男 Honō no Naka ni Tatsu Otoko) | May 19, 1993 | 978-4-08-875074-3 |
Fight 18 "Martial Ball" (舞闘祭, Butōsai); Fight 19 "Red Zone" (風の領域, Kaze no Ryōiki); Fight 20 "Tradition" (夢を継ぐ者, Yume o Tsugu Mono); Fight 21 "Out Sider" (アウトサイダー, Auto Saidā); Fight 22 "Ars Magna" (炎の中に立つ男, Honō no Naka ni Tatsu Otoko)
| 5 | Lost Sheep (復讐の季節 Fukushū no Kisetsu) | September 17, 1993 | 978-4-08-875075-0 |
Fight 23 "Lost Sheep" (復讐の季節, Fukushū no Kisetsu); Fight 24 "Dog Master" (贖いのしらべ, Aganai no Shirabe); Fight 25 "Laboratory" (業のフラスコ, Karuma no Furasuko); Fight 26 "Crumble" (崩壊, Hōkai); Fight 27 "Scapegoat" (贖罪の山羊, Shokuzai no Yagi); Fight 28 "Face the Facts" (激突, Gekitotsu); Fight 29 "Lion and the Lamb" (強き者と弱き者のために, Tsuyoki Mono to Yowaki Mono no Tame ni)
| 6 | Rain Maker (自由への道 Jiyū e no Michi) | January 19, 1994 | 978-4-08-875076-7 |
Fight 30 "Yellow Door" (審判の日, Shinpan no Hi); Fight 31 "Evil Angel" (死の天使, Shi no Tenshi); Fight 32 "Wild West Heroes" (荒野の三人, Kōya no San Nin); Fight 33 "Dog Eats Dog" (地獄の野獣, Jigoku no Yajū); Fight 34 "Betrayer" (裏切りの大地, Uragiri no Daichi); Fight 35 "Rain Maker" (自由への道, Jiyū e no Michi)
| 7 | Panzer Bride (機甲花嫁 Kikō Hanayome) | April 19, 1994 | 978-4-08-875077-4 |
Fight 36 "The Groundling" (空仰ぐ者等, Sora Aogu Monora); Fight 37 "Radio K.A.O.S." (荒野の歌人, Kōya no Utabito); Fight 38 "Undercurrent" (地底の渾沌, Chitei no Konton); Fight 39 "Panzer Bride" (機甲花嫁, Kikō Hanayome); Fight 40 "Fork of a Road" (訣別, Ketsubetsu); Fight 41 "Dual Man" (生命の甘き果実, Seimei no Amaki Kajitsu)
| 8 | War Chronicle (馬借戦記 Bājakku Senki) | September 19, 1994 | 978-4-08-875078-1 |
Fight 42 "Promise" (最後のラジオ, Saigo no Rajio); Fight 43 "Testament" (水辺の村で, Mizube no Mura de); Fight 44 "Solid State" (獣の後継, Kemono no Kōkei); Fight 45 "Insanity Being" (狂気の一千の貌, Kyōki no Issen no Kao); Fight 46 "War Chronicle" (馬借戦記, Bājakku Senki); Fight 47 "Ouroboros I" (夢と鋼, Yume to Hagane)
| 9 | Conquest (ザレム征服 Zaremu Seifuku) | July 19, 1995 | 978-4-08-875079-8 |
Fight 48 "No Problem" (脳プロブレム, Nō Puroburemu); Fight 49 "Ouroboros II" (夢とハート, Yume to Hāto); Fight 50 "Last Blade" (鋼鉄の主, Kōtetsu no Aruji); Fight 51 "Epitaph" (陽子崩壊, Yōko Hōkai); Final Fight "Conquest" (ザレム征服, Zaremu Seifuku); Epilogue

==== English-language volume list ====
| No. | Title | English release date | English ISBN |
|---|---|---|---|
| 1 | — | July 6, 1995 | 978-1-56931-003-8 |
Rusty Angel; Battle 1: Reclamation: Fighting Blood; Battle 2: Awakening: Torn Asunder; Battle 3: Values: Berserkers Reborn; Battle 4: Resurgence: Hell Trap; Battle 5: Responsibility: Conquering Angel; Battle 6: Struggle: The Tears of an Angel; Battle 7: Compassion
| 2 | Tears of an Angel | 1995 | 978-1-56931-049-6 |
Out of Blue Sky; Struggle 1: Running Wild: Iron Maiden; Struggle 2: Awakening Heart: Rainy Days; Struggle 3: Fugitive of Dreams: Bitter Dreams; Struggle 4: Broken Hearts: Beyond the Clouds; Struggle 5: Lost Lives
| 3 | Killing Angel | November 5, 1995 | 978-1-56931-092-2 |
Killing Angel; Race 1: Discovery: King of Kings; Race 2: New Alliances: The Skull Challenge: Part One; Race 3: Work to Rule: The Skull Challenge: Part Two; Race 4: To Kill or to Win: Only One Heart; Race 5: Risking All
| 4 | Angel of Victory | November 5, 1995 | 978-1-56931-082-3 |
Headbanger's Ball; Race 1: Face of Evil/Touch of Cruelty: Red Zone; Race 2: Fight Like the Wind: Carry On the Dream; Race 3: Tradition: Outsider; Race 4: Mystery Dance: Ars Magna; Race 5: The Ultimate Art
| 5 | Angel of Redemption | April 5, 1996 | 978-1-56931-053-3 |
Season of Revenge; Cycle 1: Lost Sheep: Dog Master; Cycle 2: Melody of Redemption: Flask of Karma; Cycle 3: Laboratory: Collapse; Cycle 4: Reality Crumbles: Demon Dog; Cycle 5: Scapegoat: Collision; Cycle 6: Face the Facts: The Lion and the Lamb; Cycle 7: New Angels
| 6 | Angel of Death | January 5, 1997 | 978-1-56931-127-1 |
Beyond the Yellow Door; Journey 1: Judgment Day: Angel of Death; Journey 2: Descent: Nuclear Winds; Journey 3: Pride: Hell Beast; Journey 4: Dog Eat Dog: The Plains of Betrayal; Journey 5: Cowardice: Rainmaker; Journey 6: Freedom Road
| 7 | Angel of Chaos | November 5, 1997 | 978-1-56931-178-3 |
Inherit the Skies; Mission 1: Earthbound: Bard of the Badlands; Mission 2: Reunion: Panzer Bride; Mission 3: Obsession: Den of Barjack; Mission 4: Loyalties: Fork in the Road; Mission 5: Choices: Sweet Fruit of Life; Mission 6: Duality
| 8 | Fallen Angel | March 8, 1998 | 978-1-56931-243-8 |
The Last Broadcast; Fight 1: Promise: Chasing Kaos; Fight 2: Good-byes: Solid State; Fight 3: Evolution: The Thousand Faces of Madness; Fight 4: Revolution: Barjack Chronicles; Fight 5: Death's Embrace: Ouroboros; Fight 6: Dreams and Steel
| 9 | Angel's Ascension | December 6, 1998 | 978-1-56931-293-3 |
No Brainer; Challenge 1: Revelation: Ouroboros II; Challenge 2: Gun Dreams: Last Blade; Challenge 3: Fortune: Epitaph; Challenge 4: Memory: To Take Tiphares; Challenge 5: Conquest: Epilogue

=== Battle Angel Alita: Holy Night & Other Stories ===
| No. | Original release date | Original ISBN | English release date | English ISBN |
|---|---|---|---|---|
| — | December 19, 2007 | 978-4-08-877356-8; 978-4-08-908061-0 (special edition) | October 30, 2018 (digital); November 20, 2018 (physical) | 978-1-63236-710-5 |
"Holy Night (Part 1)" (聖夜曲＜前編＞, Seiyakyoku (Zenpen)); "Holy Night (Part 2)" (聖夜曲＜中編＞, Seiyakyoku (Chūhen)); "Holy Night (Part 3)" (聖夜曲＜後編＞, Seiyakyoku (Kōhen)); "Sonic Finger (Part 1)" (音速の指＜前編＞, Sonikku Fingā (Zenpen)); "Sonic Finger (Part 2)" (音速の指＜後編＞, Sonikku Fingā (Kōhen)); "Hometown" (故郷, Furusato); "Barjack Rhapsody" (馬借音頭, Bashaku Ondo); "Behind the Scenes" (銃夢外伝〜製作裏話〜, Ganmu Gaiden Seisaku Urabanashi)

=== Battle Angel Alita: Last Order ===
| No. | Title | Original release date | English release date |
|---|---|---|---|
| 1 | Angel Reborn | July 19, 2001; 978-4-08-876188-6 | June 2003; 978-1-56931-824-9 |
Phase:01 "The First Thing I Remember" (はじめに憶えているのは, Hajime ni Oboeteiru no wa); Phase:02 "What Happened?" (なにが起きたんだ?, Nani ga Okitanda?); Phase:03 "I Am Not a Robot" (ロボットじゃない, Robotto Janai); Phase:04 "Thinking of You" (思い焦がれていたんだぜ, Omoikogareteitanda ze); Phase:05 "No Way!" (認めるかっ!!, Mitomeru ka'!!); Phase:06 "Turn the TV Off..." (テレビのスイッチを切るように, Terebi no Suitchi o Kiru Yō ni)
| 2 | Angel of the Innocents | February 19, 2002; 978-4-08-876276-0 | October 29, 2003; 978-1-56931-976-5 |
Phase:07 "The World Is Cruel" (そして世界が残酷なのは, Soshite Sekai ga Zankoku nano wa); Phase:08 "Tall Towers of Blocks Built High" (高く高く積んだ積み木の塔を, Takaku Takaku Tsunda Tsumiki no Tō o); Phase:09 "No More Excuses" (なんの負い目があるだろう, Nan no Oime ga Aru Darō); Phase:10 "A Song from Long Ago" (懐カシイ歌, Natsukashii Uta); Phase:11 "Even So..." (それでも, Soredemo); Phase:12 "How Grave a Sin It Is to Dream" (夢の罪の重さを, Yume no Tsumi no Omosa o)
| 3 | Angel Eternal | September 19, 2002; 978-4-08-876350-7 | March 10, 2004; 978-1-59116-135-6 |
Phase:13 "The World's Zenith!" (ここが世界の頂上だ, Koko ga Sekai no Chōjō Da); Phase:14 "The King of the Land of Robots, and..." (ロボットの国の王、そして, Robotto no Kuni no Ō, Soshite); Phase:15 "I'm Sure We'll Meet Again" (きっとまた会える, Kitto Mata Aeru); Phase:16 "I Will Put This World Right" (正す、世界を, Tadasu, Sekai o); Phase:17 "And When Their Day Comes..." (戦場では, Senjō dewa); Phase:18 "One Hundred Years...!" (百年か…, Hyaku Nen ka...)
| 4 | Angel of Protest | June 19, 2003; 978-4-08-876471-9 | October 19, 2004; 978-1-59116-281-0 |
Phase:19 "What Makes a Warrior" (戦士とは, Senshi to wa); Phase:20 "Good Punch!" (いいパンチだった!!, Ii Panchi Datta!!); Phase:21 "Let Me Give You Some Advice" (ひとつ忠告しておく, Hitotsu Chūkoku Shiteoku); Phase:22 "Did You See That?!" (見たか!!, Mita ka!!); Phase:23 "Space Karate Ant-Lion Larva Pit (Doodlebug Pit)!" (カラテ蟻地獄!!, Karate Arijigoku!!); Phase:24 "A Fighting Soul Ablaze Like Fire" (そして火のように戦う心も, Soshite Hi no Yō ni Tatakau Kokoro mo)
| 5 | Haunted Angel | March 19, 2004; 978-4-08-876590-7 | April 12, 2005; 978-1-59116-282-7 |
Phase:25 "Let the Z.O.T.T. Begin!" (ZOTT開催!!, Jī Ō Tī Tī Bigin!!); Phase:26 "You Might Be Champions" (あるいは優勝も…, Arui wa Yūshō mo...); Phase:27 "We Must Protect the Children" (子供達を守るために, Kodomo Tachi o Mamoru Tame ni); Phase:28 "Want to Hear My Song?" (オレの歌が聞きてェか?, Ore no Uta ga Kikitē ka?); Phase:29 "This Is So-o-o Good!" (コレですよォ〜, Kore Desu yō); Phase:30 "Join the Stars" (星になれ, Hoshi ni Nare); Phase:31 "'Round and 'Round" (まわるまわる, Mawaru Mawaru)
| 6 | The Angel & the Vampire | September 17, 2004; 978-4-08-876682-9 | November 8, 2005; 978-1-4215-0057-7 |
Phase:32 "Not Yet" (まだだ, Mada Da); Phase:33 "Not Since That Battle...!" (あの戦い以来か, Ano Tatakai Irai ka); Phase:34 "I Believe Them" (私はそれを信じる, Watashi wa Sore o Shinjiru); Phase:35 "Then I Can Go Home" (そうすれば故郷に, Sō Sureba Kokyō ni); Phase:36 "I Walked Here Before" (昔ここを歩いた, Mukashi Koko o Aruita); Phase:37 "Who...Are You?!" (お前…誰だ!?, Omae... Dare Da!?)
| 7 | Guilty Angel | March 18, 2005; 978-4-08-876777-2 | June 13, 2006; 978-1-4215-0433-9 |
Phase:38 "I Am Yoko" (私は陽子, Watashi wa Yōko); Phase:39 "I Am Alita" (私はガリィ, Watashi wa Garyi); Phase:40 "A Polliwog Is a Polliwog" (オタマはオタマ, Otama wa Otama); Phase:41 "The Greatest Moment of My Life!!" (人生最大のこの時が!!, Jinsei Saidai no Kono Toki ga!!); Phase:42 "Pisses Me Off!" (むかつくぜ!!, Mukatsuku ze!!); Phase:43 "My Son of Chaos" (混沌の息子よ, Konton no Musuko yo)
| 8 | Angel's Vision | November 18, 2005; 978-4-08-876876-2 | December 12, 2006; 978-1-4215-0865-8 |
Phase:44 "Point of No Return" (帰還限界点, Pointo obu Nō Ritān); Phase:45 "Impact Winter" (衝突の冬, Inpakuto Wintā); Phase:46 "I Believed He Felt the Same" (同じ気持ちなのだと信じた, Onaji Kimachi nano Da to Shinjita); Phase:47 "Whomever It May Be" (何者であろうと, Nanimono Dearō to); Phase:48 "Dream of an Icy Sleep" (終末の甘い夢, Shūmatsu no Amai Yume); Phase:49 "Punch Through the Thick Clouds One Day" (いつかブ厚い雲をブチ抜いて, Itsuka Buatsui Kumo o Buchinuite)
| 9 | Angel's Duty | July 19, 2006; 978-4-08-877123-6 | September 11, 2007; 978-1-4215-1348-5 |
Phase:50 "If Thy Soul" (もしそなたの魂に, Moshi Sonata no Tamashii ni); Phase:51 "Until the Day of Judgment" (最後の審判のその日まで, Saigo no Shinpan no Sono Hi made); Phase:52 "Proud and Independent...That Is" (孤高…すなわち, Kokō... Sunawachi); Phase:53 "Last Gift" (最後の贈り物, Saigo no Purezento); Phase:54 "If Thou Shedst Those Tears for Me..." (その涙が私のために流れるのなら…, Sono Namida ga Watashi no Tame ni Nagareru no nara...); Phase:55 "I Learned" (私は学んだのだ, Watashi wa Mananda no Da)
| 10 | Angel Goes Nova | July 19, 2007; 978-4-08-877270-7 | December 9, 2008; 978-1-4215-2164-0 |
Phase:56 "Flan Is Fate!" (プリンは さだめ, Purin wa Sadame); Phase:57 "The Origin of This World" (この世界の成り立ちを, Kono Sekai no Naritachi o); Phase:58 "Don't Be a Hero" (マジになるなよ, Maji ni Naruna yo); Phase:59 "Don't You Play Dumb" (スットボけてんじゃねぇ, Suttoboketenjanē); Phase:60 "Growing at Supersonic Speed" (超音速で成長中, Chō Onsoku de Seichō Chū); Phase:61 "Unique in the World" (世にも稀なる, Yo ni mo Mare Naru); Phase:62 "Darkness of Absolute Zero" (絶対零度の暗闇に, Zettai Reido no Kurayami ni)
| 11 | Angel Cake | February 19, 2008; 978-4-08-877408-4 | April 14, 2009; 978-1-4215-2590-7 |
Phase:63 "The Meaning of Indomitable" (不屈とは, Fukutsu to wa); Phase:64 "It'll Cost Ya!" (高くつくぜ!!, Takaku Tsuku ze!!); Phase:65 "Beyond Karate" (空手の果て, Karate no Hate); Phase:66 "Rarin' to Kill" (殺る気満々, Yaru Ki Manman); Phase:67 "Search and Destroy" (サーチ&キル!!, Sāchi ando Kiru!!); Phase:68 "Stepping on a Tiger's Tail" (虎の尾を踏む, Tora no O o Fumu)
| 12 | Angel Redux | August 19, 2008; 978-4-08-877483-1 | October 13, 2009; 978-1-4215-2918-9 |
Phase:69 "Once Again to the World of Combat" (ふたたび戦いの世界に, Futatabi Tatakai no Sekai ni); Phase:70 "The Only One in the Universe" (世界でひとり君だけが, Sekai de Hitori Kimi dake ga); Phase:71 "Karmic Singularity" (カルマ的特異点, Karuma Teki Shingyuraritī); Phase:72 "The Tide Is Turning" (潮の変わり目, Taido Izu Tāningu); Phase:73 "Karate Wars!" (カラテ大戦争ッ!!!, Karate Dai Sensō'!!!); Phase:74 "The Samurai and the Cat" (猫の妙術, Neko no Myōjutsu)
| 13 | Sans Angel | April 17, 2009; 978-4-08-877607-1 | June 8, 2010; 978-1-4215-3351-3 |
Phase:75 "This World of Fang and Claw" (爪と牙の世界で, Tsume to Kiba no Sekai de); Phase:76 "Devour and Fatten!" (喰らって太れ!!, Kuratte Futore!!); Phase:77 "Not Man, Not God, Not Soulless Beast!" (魂なき獣ごときに!!, Tamashii Naki Kedamono Gotoki ni!!); Phase:78 "A Man's Fist!" (漢の拳!!, Otoko no Kobushi!!); Phase:79 "The True Reason to Fight..." (戦う 本当の理由に…, Tatakau Hontō no Riyū ni...); Phase:80 "The Last Proof of Identity" (最後の存在証明, Saigo no Sonzai Shōmei); Phase:81 "The Concept of "Happiness"" (「幸せ」という言葉, "Shiawase" to Iu Kotoba)
| 14 | Angel of Defusion | November 19, 2009; 978-4-08-877748-1 | January 11, 2011; 1-4215-3795-8 |
Phase:82 "How You've Matured" (成長したじゃないか, Seichō Shita Janai ka); Phase:83 "Use Caution" (警戒せよ, Keikai Seyo); Phase:84 "Alias "Frau X"" (仮称「フラウ・X」, Kashō "Furau Ikusu"); Phase:85 "Can You Do That?!" (できるのか!?, Dekiru no ka!?); Phase:86 "Karmic Tornado!" (因果の大竜巻!!, Inga no Ōtatsumaki!!); Phase:87 "A Fresh Start" (新しい歴史を踏み出す!!, Atarashii Rekishi o Fumidasu!!)
| 15 | Last Angel Standing | June 18, 2010; 978-4-08-877885-3 | October 11, 2011; 978-1-4215-3921-8 |
Phase:88 "Our Promised Place...!!" (約束の場所…!!, Yakusoku no Basho...!!); Phase:89 "Have You Forgotten My Name?!!" (俺の名前を忘れたか!?, Ore no Namae o Wasureta ka!?); Phase:90 "A Real Pro!!" (ホントのプロだね!!, Honto no Puro Da ne!!); Phase:91 "Logic + Instinct" (論理+直感, Ronri Purasu Chokkan); Phase:92 "Operation "Glass Cat"" (「ガラスの猫」作戦, "Kōshika Suchikurā" Sakusen); Phase:93 ""True Strike!"" (「真の突き」です!!, "Shin no Tsuki" Desu!!)
| 16 | — | May 23, 2011; 978-4-06-376062-0 | December 4, 2012; 978-1-61262-275-0 |
Phase:094 "A Cornered Rat!" (一匹の窮鼠!!, Ippiki no Kyūso!!); Phase:095 "Faster than Thought" (思考よりも速く, Shikō yori mo Hayaku); Phase:096 "Space Angel" (宇宙の天使, Uchū no Tenshi); Phase:097 "The Prisoner Who Dreamed of Escape" (脱獄を夢見た囚人, Datsugoku o Yumemita Shūjin); Phase:098 "Set Free!" (解き放たれたぁ〜!!, Tokihanataretā!!); Phase:099 "Benevolent Dope" (ナイス馬鹿, Naisu Baka)
| 17 | — | April 23, 2012; 978-4-06-376630-1 | February 19, 2013; 978-1-61262-296-5 |
Phase:100 "To Be a Pervert..." (変態 それは, Hentai Sore wa); Phase:101 "Awaited with Eager Anticipation" (刮目して待つべし, Katsumoku Shite Matsu Beshi); Phase:102 "The Last Big Gun!" (最後の大物!, Saigo no Ōmono!); Phase:103 "Midnight Sun" (真夜中の太陽, Mayonaka no Taiyō); Phase:104 "Heroes of History" (歴史の主役, Rekishi no Shuyaku); Phase:105 "Emergency Program Phase 4" (緊急事態フェーズ4, Kinkyū Jitai Fēzu Yon)
| 18 | — | April 23, 2013; 978-4-06-376813-8 | September 24, 2013; 978-1-61262-297-2 |
Phase:106 "Last Order" (LASTORDER, Rasuto Ōdā); Phase:107 "Alita Quest I" (ガリィクエストI, Garyi Kuesuto Wan); Phase:108 "Alita Quest II" (ガリィクエストII, Garyi Kuesuto Tsū); Phase:109 "Alita Quest III" (ガリィクエストIII, Garyi Kuesuto Surī); Phase:110 "Alita Quest IV" (ガリィクエストIV, Garyi Kuesuto Fō); Phase:111 "Alita Quest V" (ガリィクエストV, Garyi Kuesuto Faibu); Phase:112 "Alita Quest VI" (ガリィクエストVI, Garyi Kuesuto Shikkusu); Phase:113 "Alita Quest VII" (ガリィクエストVII, Garyi Kuesuto Sebun); Phase:114 "Alita Quest VIII" (ガリィクエストVIII, Garyi Kuesuto Eito); Phase:115 "Alita Quest IX" (ガリィクエストIX, Garyi Kuesuto Nain)
| 19 | — | April 23, 2014; 978-4-06-376969-2 | September 9, 2014; 978-1-61262-920-9 |
Phase:116 "Alita Quest X" (ガリィクエストX, Garyi Kuesuto Ten); Phase:117 "Alita Quest XI" (ガリィクエストXI, Garyi Kuesuto Irebun); Phase:118 "Alita Quest XII" (ガリィクエストXII, Garyi Kuesuto Tuerubu); Phase:119 "Alita Quest XIII" (ガリィクエストXIII, Garyi Kuesuto Sātīn); Phase:120 "Alita Quest XIV" (ガリィクエストXIV, Garyi Kuesuto Fōtīn); Phase:121 "Alita Quest XV" (ガリィクエストXV, Garyi Kuesuto Fifutīn); Phase:122 "Alita Quest XVI" (ガリィクエストXVI, Garyi Kuesuto Shikkusutīn); Phase:123 "Alita Quest XVII" (ガリィクエストXVII, Garyi Kuesuto Sebuntīn); Final Phase "Alita Quest XVIII" (ガリィクエストXVIII, Garyi Kuesuto Eitīn)

==== Omnibus volume list ====
| No. | English release date | English ISBN |
|---|---|---|
| 1 | March 26, 2013 | 978-1-61262-291-0 |
Phases 01-18; Fly (飛人, Hito); The Great Machine (大・摩神, Dai-Mashīn)
| 2 | August 13, 2013 | 978-1-61262-292-7 |
Phases 19-37; The Planet of Depths (怪洋星, Kaiyōsei); Future Tokyo Headman (未来東京HEADMAN, Mirai Tōkyō Heddoman)
| 3 | February 11, 2014 | 978-1-61262-293-4 |
Phases 38-55; Space Oddity (気怪, Kikai); Junks: The Space Rovers - Part 1 (宇宙海賊少年団（前編）, Uchū Kaizoku Shōnendan (Zenpen))
| 4 | July 22, 2014 | 978-1-61262-294-1 |
Phases 56-74; Junks: The Space Rovers - Part 2 (宇宙海賊少年団（後編）, Uchū Kaizoku Shōnendan (Kōhen))
| 5 | December 9, 2014 | 978-1-61262-295-8 |
Phases 75-93

=== Battle Angel Alita: Mars Chronicle ===
| No. | Original release date | Original ISBN | English release date | English ISBN |
|---|---|---|---|---|
| 1 | May 22, 2015 | 978-4-06-377195-4 | January 23, 2018 | 978-1-63236-615-3 |
Log:001 "Martian Orphans" (火星の孤児, Kasei no Koji); Log:002 "Girls" (少女たち, Shōjo Tachi); Log:003 "Silent Corps" (無言兵団, Mugon Heidan); Log:004 "Escape" (脱出行, Dasshutsukō); Log:005 "The Trail of Refugees" (難民街道, Nanmin Kaidō); Log:006 "The Canopy's Duty" (天蓋の使命, Tengai no Shimei)
| 2 | November 20, 2015 | 978-4-06-377357-6 | April 24, 2018 | 978-1-63236-616-0 |
Log:007 "At the Ruins of Mamiana" (マミアナ跡にて, Mamiana Ato nite); Log:008 "Dasein Undercover" (ダーザインの潜在, Dāzain no Senzai); Log:009 "Einherjar" (英霊団, Einheruyaru); Log:010 "Bombproof Armored Interrogation Cell" (対爆装甲尋問室, Taibaku Sōkō Jinmonshitsu); Log:011 "Aliens on Mars" (火星の異邦人, Kasei no Ihōjin); Mukai: World of Mist (霧界, Mukai)
| 3 | July 22, 2016 | 978-4-06-377488-7 | June 5, 2018 | 978-1-63236-617-7 |
Log:012 "My House" (私のお家, Watashi no O Uchi); Log:013 "The Masked Man" (仮面の怪人, Kamen no Kaijin); Log:014 "The Roar of the Guillotine Belt" (うなるギロチンベルト, Unaru Girochin Beruto); Log:015 "Alone Together" (ふたりきり, Futari kiri); Log:016 "Castle of Evil" (悪の城, Aku no Shiro)
| 4 | May 23, 2017 | 978-4-06-393195-2 | August 28, 2018 | 978-1-63236-618-4 |
Log:017 "Fossilization Study and Application" (石化の研究と応用, Sekika no Kenkyū to Ōyō); Log:018 "Treasure Hunt" (秘宝探索, Hihō Tansaku); Log:019 "The Woman of the Castle" (城の女, Shiro no Onna); Log:020 "Lapdog of Edom" (エドムの犬, Edomu no Inu); Log:021 "The Sorrows of Young Itall" (若きイタルの悩み, Wakaki Itaru no Nayami)
| 5 | December 22, 2017 | 978-4-06-510608-2 | December 18, 2018 | 978-1-63236-658-0 |
Log:022 "Confession of a Maggot" (ウジ虫の告白, Ujimushi no Kokuhaku); Log:023 "The Death of Young Itall" (若きイタルの死, Wakaki Itaru no Shi); Log:024 "Night of the Haboob" (砂嵐の夜, Habūbu no Yoru); Log:025 "Something Important" (大切なはなし, Taisetsu na Hanashi); Log:026 "Soul of the Vagabond" (ゴロツキ魂, Gorotsuki Damashii)
| 6 | November 21, 2018 | 978-4-06-512862-6 | April 30, 2019 | 978-1-63236-718-1 |
Log:027 "Thus Sang Elton John" (エルトン・ジョンはかく歌えり, Eruton Jon wa Kaku Utaeri); Log:028 "True Feelings" (ほんとうの気持ち, Hontō no Kimochi); Log:029 "Ritual of Succession" (継承の儀, Keishō no Gi); Log:030 "Muster's Tears" (ムスターの涙, Musutā no Namida); Log:031 "Goodbye, Muster" (さよならムスター, Sayonara Musutā)
| 7 | November 20, 2020 | 978-4-06-519223-8 | July 20, 2021 | 978-1-63236-784-6 |
Log:032 "New Meetings" (新たなる出会い, Arata Naru Deai); Log:033 "Big Madam" (ビッグマダム, Biggu Madamu); Log:034 "The Secret Workshop" (秘密の工房, Himitsu no Kōbō); Log:035 "Spake the Minstrels" (吟遊詩人曰く, Gin'yū Shijin Iwaku); Log:036 "The Terrors" (恐ろしき者たち, Osoroshiki Mono Tachi)
| 8 | November 22, 2021 | 978-4-06-525955-9 | July 5, 2022 | 978-1-63236-903-1 |
Log:037 "A Bolt from the Blue" (青天の霹靂, Seiten no Hekireki); Log:038 "This Is How You Strike a Deal!" (これが取引ってヤツさ!!, Kore ga Dīru tte Yatsu sa!!); Log:039 "The Wiseheart Report" (ワイズハート論文, Waizuhāto Repōto); Log:040 "Gyapollo Attacks" (ジャポロ強襲, Japoro Kyōshū); Log:041 "Jakoleva's Counterattack" (逆襲のヤコレワ, Gyakushū no Yakorewa)
| 9 | November 22, 2022 | 978-4-06-530199-9; 978-4-06-530219-4 (special edition) | September 12, 2023 | 978-1-64651-937-8 |
Log:042 "The Legendary Atmospheric Entry" (大気圏突入伝説, Taikiken Totsunyū Densetsu); Log:043 "Not a Prisoner" (虜囚に非ず, Ryoshū ni Arazu); Log:044 "A Means, but Not a Way" (術あれど道なし, Jutsu Aredo Michi Nashi); Log:045 "Crybaby Backup" (泣き虫な助っ人, Nakimushi na Suketto); Log:046 "Tunnel Strategy" (隧道作戦, Zuidō Sakusen)
| 10 | April 23, 2024 | 978-4-06-535282-3 | February 18, 2025 | 979-8-88877-027-6 |
Log:047 "Geheimnis" (奥義, Gehaimunisu); Log:048 "Brechen Schlagen" (徹甲爆轟拳, Burehhyenshurāgen); Log:049 "A Mantis's Spirit" (心に蟷螂の斧, Kokoro ni Tōrō no Ono); Log:050 "Mission Report" (報告書, Hōkokusho); Log:051 "Duel at the Canyons of Despair" (決闘絶望谷, Kettō Zetsubō Koku)
| 11 | April 23, 2025 | 978-4-06-539217-1 | February 10, 2026 | 979-8-88877-684-1 |
Log:052 "The Last Treasure of Mars" (火星最後の秘宝, Kasei Saigo no Hihō); Log:053 "Vasily Tolsky" (ヴァシリ・トルスキ, Vashiri Torusuki); Log:054 "Catacombs" (カタコンベ, Katakonbe); Log:055 "Hexenhaus" (ヘクセンハウス, Hekusenhausu); Log:056 "Keun Kilborne" (クアン・キルボルン, Kuan Kiruborun)

=== Gunnm Panzer Kunst Chronicle ===
| No. | Original release date | Original ISBN | English release date | English ISBN |
|---|---|---|---|---|
| 1 | August 21, 2026 | 978-4-06-544761-1 | — | — |
Karma:001 Gantoretto Pasu (ガントレット・パス); Karma:002 Tsūka Girei (通過儀礼); Karma:003 Chōrō Kaigi (長老会議); The Chronicles of Solar Rebels (太陽系叛徒列伝, Taiyōkei Hanto Retsuden): Rebel:001 Merisendo no Kinka (メリセンドの菌歌)
