= List of Chibi Vampire chapters =

First volume of the English adaptation of Chibi Vampire, released by Tokyopop on April 11, 2006

The chapters of the manga series Chibi Vampire were written and illustrated Yuna Kagesaki. The series premiered in Japan as Karin in Monthly Dragon Age in 2003 where it ran till its conclusion in 2008. The 58 individual chapters were collected and published in fourteen tankōbon by Kadokawa Shoten between October 2003 and April 2008. The chapters follow the growing romance between Karin, a mixed-up vampire who gives blood instead of taking it, and Kenta, a classmate who learns her secret and becomes her daytime help.

A series of light novels, which cover the same timeline as the manga, are being written by Tohru Kai with Kagesaki. Chibi Vampire: The Novel series is closely tied to the manga releases, with each volume designed to be read after the corresponding manga volume. For example, the first novel takes place between the events that occur in the first and second volumes of the manga series. Chibi Vampire also uses characters introduced in and refers to events that occur within the novel series. As of April 2008, nine volumes have been released in the light novel series in Japan. The manga was also adapted into a twenty-four episode anime series produced by J.C.Staff. The anime series aired in Japan on WOWOW from November 3, 2005, through May 11, 2006.

The series is licensed for English-language release in North America by Tokyopop, which renamed the series from Karin to Chibi Vampire To avoid confusion with another of its properties. It released the first volume in April 2006; the final volume was released in September 2009.

== Volume list ==
No.	Original release date	Original ISBN	English release date	English ISBN
1	October 1, 2003	4-04-712343-9	April 11, 2006	978-1-59816-322-3
1st Embarrassment: "Karin and the Mysterious Boy ~First Impression~"; 2nd Embarrassment: "Karin's Family and the Dangerous Afternoon ~A Hard Nut to Crack~"; 3rd Embarrassment: "Karin's Face and the Mask Removed ~Fall Off~"; 4th Embarrassment: "Karin's Worries and Kenta's Distress ~Confinement~"; 5th Embarrassment: "Karin's Preference and the Charming Woman ~Taste~"
Karin Maaka is a vampire. However, she can go out in the daylight. When she gets near new student Kenta Usui, Karin feels ill; confronted about why she avoids him, Karin suffers a nosebleed. (She is a blood-producing vampire, not a bloodsucker.) Making matters worse is they work the same part-time job. Karin's brother Ren reveals each vampire is drawn to humans with a strong emotion that appeals to them. They run into Fumio Usui, unknown to them Kenta's mother; Karin bites her, and learns misery is her blood affinity. Karin resolves to make Kenta happy as possible to prevent her blood from increasing.
2	March 1, 2004	4-04-712351-X	August 8, 2006	978-1-59816-323-0
6th Embarrassment: "Kenta's Question and the Little Girl's Words ~Doubt~"; 7th Embarrassment: "Anju's Plan and Karin's Truth ~Plot~"; 8th Embarrassment: "Karin's Tears and Kenta's Pride ~Pride~"; 9th Embarrassment: "Karin's Bewilderment and Anju's Proposal ~Propose~"; 10th Embarrassment: "Kenta's Circumstances and the Parents' Judgment ~Judgment~"
Kenta becomes suspicious of Karin's behavior; Karin's little sister, Anju likewise keeps tabs on him. Seeing Kenta already accepts Karin and kept her nosebleed secret, Anju decides to test him. She leads Kenta to Karin when she bites someone; Kenta doesn't reject Karin, taking the fact she's a vampire well. Anju convinces the family to make Kenta an ally, so someone can help Karin in the daylight.
3	July 1, 2004	4-04-712362-5	December 12, 2006	978-1-59816-324-7
11th Embarrassment: "Karin's Progress and Ren's Smile ~Smile~"; 12th Embarrassment: "Karin's Idea and the Odd Pair ~Thought~"; 13th Embarrassment: "Fumio's Choice and Harumi's Resolution ~Resolution~"; Bonus Story #1: "Anju's School and Boogie-kun's Return ~Anju Special~"; 14th Embarrassment: "The Family Secret and Karin the Outcast ~Secret~"
Kenta keeps an eye on his mother, noticing Karin's fang marks are still on Fumio's neck; until they fade, Fumio will still be cheery. Karin is likewise happy, as Kenta is now less burdened thanks to her support. Fumio discovers the love hotel she cleans tricks high school girls into becoming prostitutes, befriending a girl Karin bit. Ren runs into her, slyly hinting to Karin that he'll bite Fumio once her stress returns. Fumio manages to get the police to shut down the hotel, rescuing the girls.
4	November 1, 2004	4-04-712376-5	April 10, 2007	978-1-59816-325-4
15th Embarrassment: "Karin's Patience and Kenta's Danger ~Patience~"; 16th Embarrassment: "Karin's Regret and Kenta's Uneasiness ~Uneasy~"; 17th Embarrassment: "Karin's Feelings and Ren's Indignation ~Indignation~"; 18th Embarrassment: "Karin's First Love and Maki's Meddling ~First Love~"; 2nd Bonus Story: "Ren's Graduation and Hinata's Memory ~Ren Special~"
Karin's plan to save Fumio from Ren hits a snag. She runs into Kenta and her blood increases to the point she becomes feral and pins him. However, hearing her name snaps Karin out of it; she a nosebleed instead. Without her excess blood, Karin ties to talk Ren out of biting Fumio; their father intervenes, believing they owe Kenta that much. Karin comes to a realization about why she does so much for Kenta; she's fallen in love with him.
5	March 1, 2005	4-04-712390-0	August 7, 2007	978-1-59816-326-1
19th Embarrassment: "The Panicked Family and the Mean Grandma ~Confusion~"; 20th Embarrassment: "Usui-Kun's Cold and Grandma's Scheming ~Intrigue~"; 21st Embarrassment: "The Bloody Kiss and the Vampire Sleep ~Thanatos~"; 22nd Embarrassment: "The Vampire Assembly and Karin's Christmas ~Holy Night~"; 3rd Bonus Story: "James' Lie and Calera's Pride ~Henry & Calera Special~"
Karin meets her grandmother Elda Marker, whom she is a twin of. She tries to keep Elda in the dark about her life, but is caught giving a loving gaze at Kenta. Elda warns Karin not to pursue Kenta as it will lead to heartbreak. Come Christmas time, Karin holds in her blood, just to enjoy the warmth being near Kenta gives her. At the same, the vampire council grows suspicious of the Markers for having no trouble reproducing when the rest of them are struggling.
6	July 1, 2005	4-04-712409-5	November 7, 2007	978-1-59816-880-8
23rd Embarrassment: "The Suspicious Pair and Kenta's Anxiety ~Anxiety~"; 24th Embarrassment: "Usui-Kun's Panic and Fumio's Unrest ~Embarrassment~"; 25th Embarrassment: "Kenta's Suffering and Karin's Flight ~Run Away From Home~"; 26th Embarrassment: "Fumio's Confession and Kenta's Rejection ~Refusal~"
Things get thrown into chaos when both Fumio's ex and a detective arrive in town; the detective was hired to bring Fumio home. Karin suffers a nosebleed so bad, she passes out for a week. The Markers forbid Karin from seeing Kenta, but she goes to find him. Running into Fumio, Karin learns Kenta's past; Fumio got pregnant in high school, and her mother refused to acknowledge Kenta's existence. Fumio also figures out Karin loves Kenta. Reunited with Kenta, Karin is heartbroken that he wants to stay away. She reveals her blood affinity and he takes it the wrong way.
7	October 8, 2005	4-04-712424-9	February 12, 2008	978-1-59816-881-5
27th Embarrassment: "Depressed Usui and Karin's Coming Out ~Coming Out~"; 28th Embarrassment: "Karin's Chase and Karin's First ~Chase~"; 29th Embarrassment: "Dream Karin and Kenta's Home ~Bonds~"; 30th Embarrassment: "The Conclusion and the Future ~Conclusion~"
Karin runs into Kenta's father and learns Fumio's mother caused them nothing but misery; he's only there to set the record straight. Catching Kenta, Karin vents her pain and offers to there for him. Per his prompting, Karin bites Kenta. Kenta dreams of Karin, who tells him to tell her how he feels. Prompted by Karin's blood, Kenta vents his years of pain to his father. This allows him to close the door on his past.
8	April 1, 2006	4-04-712426-5	May 13, 2008	978-1-4278-0113-5
31st Embarrassment: "Maki's Worries and Karin's Gossip ~Worry~"; 32nd Embarrassment: "What Usui-kun Doesn't Know and the Newbie ~New Face~"; 33rd Embarrassment: "Karin's Lovesickness and Yuriya's Secret ~Lovesickness~"; 34th Embarrassment: "Maki's Push and Kenta's Reservations ~Reserve~"; 35th Embarrassment: "The Karin Inside of Kenta and Karin's First Date ~First Date~"; 4th Bonus Story: "Maki Who Doesn't Know and Karin Who Cannot Say ~Maki Special~"
Maki asks Karin about the progress of her relationship with Kenta, learning they've held hands. At the same time, the mysterious Yuriya Tachibani moves to town at the behest of her uncle; she becomes Karin and Kenta's coworker. Karin confuses Kenta helping Yuriya for liking her. Maki asks Kenta how he feels about Karin, finally getting him to see he loves Karin. Maki sets the two up on Valentine's Day date. Anju follows them.
9	September 1, 2006	4-04-712460-5	July 12, 2008	978-1-42780-197-5
36th Embarrassment: "Karin's Hesitation and Kenta's Confession ~Confession~"; 37th Embarrassment: "The Two Beginners and Yuriya's Investigation ~Beginners~"; 38th Embarrassment: "Yuriya's Secret and the Maaka Family's Strategy ~Scheme~"; 39th Embarrassment: "Yuriya's Imprisonment and Her Uncle's Identity ~Identity~"
To Karin's shock, Kenta confesses his love for her. Knowing they can never have a normal life together, she tries to push him away, but Kenta refuses give up on her. Karin hugs him, revealing their love is mutual. Deciding to give a relationship a go, Karin makes Anju keep this secret from the rest of the family. Yuriya becomes suspicious of them, accidentally getting hit by one of Karin's nosebleeds. Anju, suspicious of Yuriya, discovers the mysterious girl is of vampiric lineage. The Markers kidnap Yuriya for answers, but get nowhere. Karin discovers this, coercing Yuriya into revealing she is a vampire-human hybrid; Yuriya learns Karin is an "odd" vampire. Touched by Karin's kindness, Yuriya keeps her existence secret from her uncle.
10	December 28, 2006	4-04-712474-5	September 11, 2008	978-1-4278-0674-1
40th Embarrassment: "Usui-kun's Birthday and Karin's Present ~Present~"; 41st Embarrassment: "Grandma's Suspicion and Kenta's Shame"; 42nd Embarrassment: "Karin's Disclosure and Elda's Suggestion ~Disclosure~"; 5th Bonus Story: "The Unknown Land and Elda's Sadness ~Elda Special~"; Extras: "Soft Bed and Secrets Revealed ~Snug~"
Kenta is told of Yuriya's nature, accidentally letting it slip he was worried about himself and Karin being able to have children. Karin is also told by Yuriya that human-vampire romances end sadly; just as Elda told her. Karin learns Kenta's birthday is February 29, knitting him a scarf. Unfortunately, Elda has woken again, and tries pulling them apart. Worse, she discovers Yuriya and nearly kills her for being a half-breed. Elda reveals half-breeds are born sterile; Karin is left hurt, knowing she can't give Kenta the family he's dreamed of. Worried about Karin's nosebleeds, Elda suggests Camera visit her parents to learn about their history.
11	April 1, 2007	978-4-04-712486-8	November 1, 2008	978-1-4278-0825-7
43rd Embarrassment: "A New Semester and Anju's Melancholy ~Melancholy~"; 44th Embarrassment: "Anju's Hesitation and Yuriya's Past ~The Past~"; 45th Embarrassment: "Boogie-kun's Support and Anju's Decision ~Supporter~"; 46th Embarrassment: "Koibuchi-kun's Loneliness and Anju's Sadness ~Solitary~"
Anju notices the sunlight bothering her more than usual, but still pushes herself to go to school. Karin makes some soup to make Anju feel better, though their father suspects Anju is close to awakening. The following day, Karin accidentally drops a bottle of hot sauce in the soup; she lets Anju eat it to test if her human sense of taste has vanished, which it has. The spicy food has an adverse effect on Anju, who becomes sick at school and begins craving blood. Hiding behind the school auditorium, Anju is found by one of her classmates; she listens to his own plight, realizing "loneliness" is her blood preference. After drinking his blood, Anju is found by Karin and proceeds to alter the memories of the humans who knew her to believe she transferred to another school. Karin congratulates Anju on maturing, unintentionally hurting her feelings; Anju wanted to stay in the daylight with her longer. Anju locks herself in her room, with Ren reluctantly keeping her company.
12	August 9, 2007	978-4-04-712505-6	January 1, 2009	978-1-4278-1140-0
47th Embarrassment: "Helpless Karin and the Lid on Her Heart ~Helpless~"; 48th Embarrassment: "Karin's Dilemma and Kenta's Happiness ~Happiness~"; 49th Embarrassment: "Everyone's Choices and Calera's Report ~A Report~"; 50th Embarrassment: "Kenta Alone and Karin's First... ~Initial Experience~"
Karin is still saddened by Anju maturing into an adult vampire. However, she cheers up a bit when Kenta starts having breakfast with her. Suffering a blood increase at work, Karin is escorted home by Kenta, who offers his neck to her. However, when confronted about bottling her feelings, Karin remembers she can't give Kenta a future and reveals hybrids are sterile, but Kentai s uncaring; without Karin in his life, he would go back to being miserable. Fumio leaves to tend to her sick mother, leaving Kenta lonely. Karin resonates with his unhappiness and needs to bite Kenta. However, she surprises him with a kiss before she bites. Calera returns with terrible news; Karin is the latest "Spring of Psyche" from the Armesh bloodline. Her blood production will eventually bleed Karin dry.
13	December 28, 2007	978-4-04-712519-3	April 14, 2009	978-1-4278-1279-7
51st Embarrassment: "Glark's Plan and Yuriya's Invitation"; 52nd Embarrassment: "The Markers' Search and Kenta's Guidance"; 53rd Embarrassment: "Bridget's Joy and Karin's Determination"; 54th Embarrassment: "Karin Captured and Kenta's Rescue Party"
Yuriya accidentally lets it slip about Karin; so her uncle Glark orders her to lure Karin away from the Markers. The Markers search for Karin, while Kenta is shown the way by "dream Karin". Glark's ally Bridget Braunlich badly injures Kenta and they escape. Kenta learns the Braunlich manor is in his old town; he, Ren and Mr. Marker head to rescue Karin. Karin also learns the horrible fate planned for her.
14	April 9, 2008	978-4-04-712539-1	September 29, 2009	978-1-4278-1625-2
55th Embarrassment: "Karin's Despair and Fragments of Sophia"; 56th Embarrassment: "Yuriya's Repentance and the Vampire Battle"; 57th Embarrassment: "Survival at Dawn and the End of the Fight"; 58th Embarrassment: "The Morning Promise and the Happy Future"
Mr. Marker lures the Braunlichs into a fight, hoping to be mutually killed via sunlight. However, Elda arrives to save her son by blocking the sun with bats; Yuriya saves the Braunlichs with a heavy curtain. Kenta manages save Karin with Ren "restraining" Bridget. Kenta visits his grandmother, putting the past behind him. Two years later, Karin has become "human"; she no longer produces blood, but is otherwise the same. For her happiness, the Markers rewrite Karin's memory. With Karin now thinking she's an orphan, Kenta promises to make her happy; he proposes. They live a happy life, having a daughter. All the while, the Markers watch over them.
