= List of Kitchen Princess chapters =

The chapters of the Japanese shōjo manga series Kitchen Princess (Japanese: キッチンのお姫さま, Hepburn: Kitchin no Ohime-sama) are written by Miyuki Kobayashi and illustrated by Natsumi Andō and have been serialized in the monthly manga magazine Nakayoshi by Kodansha from 2004 to 2008. The story is about protagonist Najika Kazami, an orphan from Hokkaidō with a talent for cooking, transfers to Seika Academy to chase her dream of being a great chef, and to find her "Flan Prince", a boy that saved her from falling into a river and gave her a cup of flan with a silver spoon with the school's emblem on it. It won the Kodansha Manga Award for children's manga in 2006.

The manga series includes 47 chapters which are collected in tankōbon and are released by Kodansha. The first volume of Kitchen Princess was released on February 4, 2005, and last was released on November 6, 2008. The series has also been released in English Del Rey Manga in the USA.

== Volume list ==
No.	Original release date	Original ISBN	English release date	English ISBN
01	February 4, 2005	978-4-06-364069-4	January 30, 2007	978-0-345-49620-1
Recipe 1. "Najika and Flan" (ナジカとプリン, "Najika to Purin"); Recipe 2. "Najika and Taramasalata" (ナジカとタラモサラタ, "Najika to Taramosarata"); Recipe 3. "Najika and Rainbow Colored Jelly" (ナジカと虹色ジリー, "Najika to Niji Iro jirii"); Recipe 4. "Najika and Christmas Cookie" (ナジカとクリスマスクッキー, "Najika to kurisumasu kukkii"); Recipe 5. "Najika and Onion Gratin Soup" (ナジカとオニオングラタンスープ, "Najika to Onion Guratan Suupu")
02	August 5, 2005	978-4-06-364083-0	May 1, 2007	978-0-345-49659-1
Recipe 6. "Najika and Chocolate Macarons" (ナジカとチョコレート.マカロン, "Najika to Chokoreeto Makaron); Recipe 7. "Najika and Strawberry Shortcake" (ナジカとイチゴのショートケーキ, "Najika to Ichigo no Shooto Keeki"); Recipe 8. "Najika and The Cake of Rice" (ナジカとライス．ケーキ, "Najika to Raisu Keeki"); Recipe 9. "Najika and Yogurt Mousse" (ナジカとヨーグルト.ムース, "Najika to Yooguruto Muusu"); Recipe 10. "Najika and Peach Pie" (ナジカとピーチパイ, "Najika to Piichi Pai")
03	December 6, 2005	978-4-06-364097-7	July 31, 2007	978-0-345-49660-7
Recipe 11. "Najika and Polka Dot Pancake" (ナジカと水玉のパンケーキ, "Najika to Mizutama no Pankeeki"); Recipe 12. "Najika and the Rolled sandwich" (ナジカとロール.サンドイッチョ, "Najika to Rooru Sandoiccho"); Recipe 13. "Najika and the Banana Cream Puff" (ナジカとバナナシューケリーム, "Najika to Banana"); Recipe 14. "Najika and Carrot Cake" (ナジカとキャロットケーキ, "Najika to Kyarotto Keeki"); Recipe 15. "Najika and Mont Blanc" (ナジカとモングラン, "Najika to Monguran")
04	April 28, 2006	978-4-06-364109-7	October 30, 2007	978-0-345-49830-4
Recipe 16. "Najika and the Omurice" (ナジカとオムライス, "Najika to Omuraisu"); Recipe 17. "Najika and the Apple Cake" (ナジカとりんごケーキ, "Najika to Ringo Keeki"); Recipe 18. "Najika and the Cocoa Scone" (ナジカとココアスコーン, "Najika to Cocoa Sucoon"); Recipe 19. "Najika and Fruit Agar" (ナジカとフルーツ寒天, "Najika to furuutsu Kanten")
05	August 4, 2006	978-4-06-364117-2	February 19, 2008	978-0-345-49885-4
Recipe 20. "Najika and the Strawberry Tart" (ナジカとイチゴのタルト, "Najika to Ichigo no Taruto"); Recipe 21. "Najika and Castella" (ナジカとカステラ, "Najika to Kasutera"); Recipe 22. "Najika and the Crepes" (ナジカとクレープ, "Najika to kureepu"); Recipe 23. "Najika and Souffle Ice Cream" (ナジカとスフレアイスクリーム, "Najika to Sufure Aisukuriimu")
06	February 6, 2007	978-4-06-364134-9	May 6, 2008	978-0-345-50194-3
Recipe 24. "Najika and the Bruschetta" (ナジカとブルスケッタ, "Najika to Burusuketta"); Recipe 25. "Najika and the Flan Cake" (ナジカとプリンケーキ, "Najika to Purin Keeki"); Recipe 26. "Najika and The Curry Roll" (ナジカとカレーロール, "Najika to Karee Rooru"); Recipe 27. "Najika and The Yogurt Bread" (ナジカとヨーグレトブレッド, "Najika to Yoogureto Bureddo"); Recipe 28. "Najika and the Baked Sweet Potato Mash" (ナジカとスイートポテト, "Najika to Suiito Poteto")
07	June 6, 2007	978-4-06-364149-3	August 5, 2008	978-0-345-50405-0
Recipe 29. "Najika and the Fruit Cocktail" (ナジカとフルーツカクテル, "Najika to Furuutsu Kakuteru"); Recipe 30. "Najika and the Madeleines" (ナジカとマドレータ, "Najika to Madoreeta"); Recipe 31. "Najika and the Neapolitan Spaghetti" (ナジカとスパゲッテｲ, "Najika to Supagettei"); Recipe 32. "Najika and the Mille-feulle" (ナジカとミレフｲーユ, "Najika to Mire Fuiiyu"); Recipe 33. "Najika and the Cheesecake" (ナジカとチーズケーキ, "Najika to Chiizu Keeki")
08	November 6, 2007	978-4-06-364166-0	October 14, 2008	978-0-345-50805-8
Recipe 34. "Najika and the Fruit Jam" (ナジカと, Najika to); Recipe 35. "Najika and the Tea Sandwich" (ナジカと, Najika to); Recipe 36. "Najika and the High Tea (Part 1)" (ナジカと, Najika to); Recipe 37. "Najika and the High Tea (Part 2)" (ナジカと, Najika to); Recipe 38. "Najika and Baci" (ナジカ と, Najika to)
09	June 6, 2008	978-4-06-364187-5	March 24, 2009	978-0-345-51026-6
Recipe 39. "Najika and the Cinnamon Roll" (ナジカと, Najika to); Recipe 40. "Najika and the Hot Chocolate" (ナジカと, Najika to); Recipe 41. "Najika and the Banana Bread" (ナジカと, Najika to); Recipe 42. "Najika and the Chicken Doria" (ナジカと, Najika to); Recipe 43. "Najika and the Vegetable Potage" (ナジカと, Najika to)
10	November 6, 2008	978-4-06-364202-5	July 7, 2009	978-0-345-51027-3
Recipe 44. "Najika and Salt Caramel" (ナジカと, Najika to); Recipe 45. "Najika and Paella" (ナジカと, Najika to); Recipe 46. "Najika and Cocktail" (ナジカと, Najika to); Last Recipe. "Najika and Crème Brûlée" (ナジカと, Najika to)
