= List of Air Gear chapters =

The cover of Air Gear volume 1 as released by Kodansha on September 17, 2008, in Japan.

This is a list of chapters, in their volumes, for the manga series, Air Gear. The series ended at volume 37. totaling 357 chapters, released on July 17, 2012. In North America, the series was licensed by Del Rey and, after its shut down, by Kodansha USA.

== Volume list ==
No.	Original release date	Original ISBN	English release date	English ISBN
1	May 14, 2003	978-4-06-363242-2	July 25, 2006	978-0-345-49278-4
Trick 1–5
2	July 15, 2003	978-4-06-363266-8	October 31, 2006	978-0-345-49279-1
Trick 6–14
3	October 17, 2003	978-4-06-363303-0	January 31, 2007	978-0-345-49280-7
Trick 15–23
4	December 17, 2003	978-4-06-363325-2	May 1, 2007	978-0-345-49281-4
Trick 24–32
5	March 17, 2004	978-4-06-363347-4	July 31, 2007	978-0-345-49282-1
Trick 33–41
6	May 17, 2004	978-4-06-363370-2	October 30, 2007	978-0-345-49283-8
Trick 42–50
7	August 17, 2004	978-4-06-363415-0	January 31, 2008	978-0-345-49909-7
Trick 51–59
8	November 17, 2004	978-4-06-363450-1	April 29, 2008	978-0-345-49910-3
Trick 60–68
9	February 17, 2005	978-4-06-363486-0	July 29, 2008	978-0-345-50195-0
Trick 69–77
10	May 17, 2005	978-4-06-363528-7	October 28, 2008	978-0-345-50813-3
Trick 78–86
11	August 17, 2005	978-4-06-363562-1	January 27, 2009	978-0-345-50814-0
Trick 87–95
12	December 16, 2005	978-4-06-363613-0	April 28, 2009	978-0-345-50815-7
Trick 96–104
13	March 17, 2006	978-4-06-363639-0	July 28, 2009	978-0-345-50816-4
Trick 105–113
14	June 16, 2006	978-4-06-363678-9; 978-4-06-362056-6 (limited edition)	October 27, 2009	978-0-345-50817-1
Trick 114–122
15	September 15, 2006	978-4-06-363717-5; 978-4-06-362061-0 (limited edition)	August 31, 2010	978-0-345-50818-8
Trick 123–132
16	January 17, 2007	978-4-06-363775-5	August 31, 2010	978-0-345-50818-8
Trick 133–143
17	April 17, 2007	978-4-06-363816-5	August 31, 2010	978-0-345-50818-8
Trick 144–155
18	August 17, 2007	978-4-06-363865-3	June 14, 2011	978-1-93-542909-8
Trick 156–165
19	November 16, 2007	978-4-06-363909-4	August 16, 2011	978-1-93-542910-4
Trick 166–175
20	March 17, 2008	978-4-06-363960-5; 978-4-06-362101-3 (limited edition)	October 25, 2011	978-1-93-542911-1
Trick 176–185
21	June 17, 2008	978-4-06-363996-4; 978-4-06-362115-0 (limited edition)	December 13, 2011	978-1-93-542912-8
Trick 186–196
22	September 17, 2008	978-4-06-384036-0	February 14, 2012	978-1-61-262027-5
Trick 197–207
23	December 17, 2008	978-4-06-384082-7	April 17, 2012	978-1-61-262028-2
Trick 208–217
24	March 17, 2009	978-4-06-384109-1	June 12, 2012	978-1-61-262029-9
Trick 218–227
25	June 17, 2009	978-4-06-384144-2	August 7, 2012	978-1-61-262030-5
Trick 228–237
26	September 17, 2009	978-4-06-384183-1	October 9, 2012	978-1-61-262031-2
Trick 238–247
27	December 17, 2009	978-4-06-384220-3	February 19, 2013	978-1-61-262032-9
Trick 248–256
28	April 16, 2010	978-4-06-384279-1	June 18, 2013	978-1-61-262033-6
Trick 257–266
29	July 16, 2010	978-4-06-384325-5	October 29, 2013	978-1-61-262034-3
Trick 267–277
30	November 17, 2010	978-4-06-384394-1	February 4, 2014	978-1-61-262035-0
Trick 278–286
31	March 17, 2011	978-4-06-384457-3	June 24, 2014	978-1-61-262246-0
Trick 287–296
32	June 17, 2011	978-4-06-384501-3	October 21, 2014	978-1-61-262247-7
Trick 297–306
33	September 16, 2011	978-4-06-384550-1	February 24, 2015	978-1-61-262248-4
Trick 307–316
34	December 16, 2011	978-4-06-384596-9	April 12, 2016	978-1-61-262104-3
Trick 317–327
35	March 16, 2012	978-4-06-384640-9	June 14, 2016	978-1-61-262105-0
Trick 328–338
36	June 15, 2012	978-4-06-384685-0	June 15, 2017	978-1-61-262106-7
Trick 339–348
37	July 17, 2012	978-4-06-384702-4	June 26, 2018	978-1-61-262107-4
Trick 349–357
