= List of xxxHolic chapters =

The cover of the first volume of xxxHolic as published by Kodansha on July 25, 2003, in Japan.

The chapters of the seinen manga series xxxHolic are written and illustrated by Clamp, a group of four manga artists. They have been serialized by Kodansha since 2003 and ended in February 2011. The series, which ties in strongly with another of Clamp's series, Tsubasa: Reservoir Chronicle, revolves around Kimihiro Watanuki, a high-school student plagued by spirits who is employed by Yūko Ichihara at her wish-granting shop.

Its serialization in the journal Young Magazine was interrupted in March 2010 and continued on Kodansha's Bessatsu Shōnen Magazine in June 2010. A one-shot chapter of xxxHolic was also published in Weekly Shōnen Magazine in its June 2010 issue featuring a crossover with Clamp's manga Tsubasa: Reservoir Chronicle. The 213 chapters are collected and released in tankōbon format by Kodansha. The numbers of chapters for such release was reduced by combining the ones from the original serialization. Starting volume 16, the series is retitled xxxHolic Rō (×××HOLiC・籠; lit. 'xxxHolic Cage'), but the number of chapters follow the previous ones. Production I.G adapted the manga into an animated film, which was followed by two anime television series and various original video animations.

A total of nineteen volumes were released from July 25, 2003, to March 9, 2011. xxxHolic was one of the first four manga series licensed for English release in North America by Del Rey Manga, and was acquired together with Mobile Suit Gundam SEED, Negima!: Magister Negi Magi, and Tsubasa: Reservoir Chronicle in January 2004. Del Rey does not include chapter lists in this series anymore as they were mixed up in early translations of the series. Del Rey published its first volume on April 27, 2004, and as of March 9, 2012, all nineteen volumes were released. The series has also been licensed for an English-language release by Tanoshimi, who released the first nine volumes in the United Kingdom with the first one on August 3, 2006.

A new xxxHolic manga titled xxxHolic Rei (XXXHOLiC ◆ 戻 < レイ >; lit. 'xxxHolic Return') was announced at The CLAMP Festival 2012 event. It started serialization in Kodansha's Young Magazine in March 2013.

== Volume list ==
=== xxxHolic ===
No.	Title	Original release date	English release date
01	A store. A shop... where wishes are granted. And in exchange... ...a proper payment. That way balance is ensured. (Mise yo. Negai ga kanau, Mise. Sono kawari, Taika o Itadaku wa Sore ni Miatta, ne. (lit. A shop. A place named a shop that grants those things named wishes. In exchange, a price will be paid. An equivalent price, that is.)) (店よ。ネガイがかなう、ミセ。そのかわり、対価を頂くわ。それに見合った、ね。)	July 25, 2003; 978-4-06-334752-4	April 27, 2004 (NA); August 3, 2006.(UK); 978-0-345-47058-4 (NA); ISBN 978-0-09-950407-8 (UK)
Chapters 1–8
Kimihiro Watanuki, a teenager plagued by spirits, meets Yūko Ichihara, who claims to be able to grant his wish to not see them anymore. Accepting, Yūko tricks Watanuki into working for her, saying that she will grant his wish once he has done enough work to pay for it. As her cook and cleaner, he witnesses Yūko's way of life, to grant the wish of anyone that enters her shop, if they pay the price she demands. Shortly after Watanuki starts work, a teenager named Syaoran arrives to the shop begging Yūko's help to save an unconscious girl named Sakura.
02	WATCH OUT FOR WITCHES	October 17, 2003; 978-4-06-334790-6	June 29, 2004 (NA) (UK); 978-0-345-47119-2 (NA); ISBN 978-0-09-950408-5 (UK)
Chapters 9–15
To help Syaoran traverse worlds to recover Sakura's lost memories, Watanuki awakens the two Mokona Modoki, talking rabbit-like creatures. Yūko gives Syaoran the white one, while the black one stays in the shop. Later, Watanuki mentions to Yūko that he does not like having his fortune told, so she decides that they should set off to have his fortune told. Watanuki is told by the fortune teller that his parents have passed safely into the afterlife, and that his life will change. Later, being too shy to invite his crush, Himawari Kunogi, on a date, Yūko invites both of them together with, Shizuka Dōmeki, who Watanuki hates, to tell ghost stories. After the group is attacked by spirits, Yūko tells Watanuki to stay with Dōmeki because he can repel them.
03	I told you before... The Treasure Room is a Mountain of Treasure! Remember? (Dakara Itta desho, "Hōmotsuko wa Takara no Yama da"-tte. (lit. Didn't I say before? That "The Treasure Storeroom is a Mountain of Treasure!")) (だから言ったでしょ、「宝物庫はタカラの山だ」って。)	February 17, 2004; 978-4-06-334841-5	October 12, 2004 (NA) (UK); 978-0-345-47181-9 (NA); ISBN 978-0-09-950409-2 (UK)
Chapters 16-22
To help out a friend of Himawari's, Watanuki is sent together with Dōmeki to investigate strange phenomenon caused by people using Angel-san, a Japanese equivalent to a Ouija Board. With Watanuki able to detect spirits, and Dōmeki able to repel, the two are able to stop the spirits. Later, a woman arrives at Yūko's shop, and Yūko gives her a container she was interested in, in exchange for promising never to open it. However, it slides open after being touched by Himawari, to reveal a Monkey's Paw inside. She uses it to try to help her in her job, only to have her killed by it in the end. Later, Watanuki arrives at an oden stand run by foxes, whom he befriends.
04	Here... ...and there, too. It's difficult... but's let's go ahead and trust in the future. (Atchi mo Kotchi mo Taihen dakedo, Shinjimashō - Mirai o. (lit. There may be troubles here and there, but I'll believe in it - that future.)) (あっちもこっちも大変だけど、信じましょう 未来を。)	June 17, 2004; 978-4-06-334881-1	January 25, 2005 (NA); September 7, 2006 (UK); 978-0-345-47788-0 (NA); ISBN 978-0-09-950483-2 (UK)
Chapters 23-28
Watanuki, having baked Valentine's Day chocolates for everyone, takes one to school for Himawari, where it is eaten by Dōmeki instead. After school, Watanuki and Dōmeki happen upon Zashiki-Warashi, who is searching for a special Valentine's Day chocolate, and finds it as Dōmeki's "soul", the chocolate of Watanuki's he ate. However removing Dōmeki's "soul" sends him into a coma, and Watanuki chases after the Zashiki-Warashi to get his "soul" back. When he catches up with her, she returns it to him as he was the person that she wanted to give the chocolate to. Later, Watanuki meets with a woman being bound by the 'bonds' that her sister's words of discouragement can cause, and tries to help her. Later, Watanuki reminisces on a friend he had years ago, who vanished on his birthday. In the last chapter, Watanuki ponders on how he is glad that children cannot see spirits as much as they used to, because of the dangers involved.
05	Be very careful. Being "Game" is very dangerous. (Ki o tsukenasai. "E" ni sarenai yō ni. (lit. Please be careful. So that you don't become "E".)) (気をつけなさい。「エ」にされないように。)	November 17, 2004; 978-4-06-334941-2	May 31, 2005 (NA); 978-0-345-47789-7 (NA)
Chapters 29-34
The spirit of rain, Ame-Warashi, requests Watanuki's help to save a friend of hers. Watanuki and Dōmeki go to a Hydrangea macrophylla directed by Ame-warashi. Dragged by a black aura, Watanuki finds the spirit of a girl who cannot go to the afterlife. After Domeki helps Watanuki escape, Watanuki finds the girl's corpse and tries to contact her family to bury her. In exchange for saving the Hydrangea Macrophyla from the corpse, Watanuki is given Kudakitsune, a Kuda-gitsune that devours the mushi wings that a girl manifested due to her uncontrollable emotions. With the Kuda-gitsune having grown enormous, Yūko sends it alongside Watanuki to a world inside a jug to return to a smaller side. There, Watanuki finds Zashiki-Warashi and gives her the White Day present, while Yūko is able to find the location from the magician who created the mushi.
06	He needs practice for what will come in the future. And the store is that. (Ano Mise wa ne. Kore kara Okoru Koto no Tame ni Kamaetamono na no. (lit. That shop is... well, it was set up for what will happen from now on.)) (あの店はね。これから起こるコトの為に構えたものなの。)	May 17, 2005; 978-4-06-372015-0	October 25, 2005 (NA); 978-0-345-47790-3 (NA)
Chapters 35-42
While running an errand with Dōmeki to obtain manna for Yūko, Watanuki is told by a spiritual-like tree about how the things he attracts will change thanks to meeting a person. Days later, while Yūko leaves the shop, Watanuki befriends a lonely woman. The more times Watanuki frequents her, he starts becoming weaker, to the point of collapsing various times. Although Watanuki realizes that, he tries to visit her once again, but Dōmeki throws an arrow at her, as he realizes she is not human. The woman disappears grateful to Watanuki, who still decides to stay in contact with Dōmeki, as he understands he did not wish him to die.
07	With that, he can change bit by bit.	October 17, 2005; 978-4-06-372081-5	May 30, 2006 (NA); June 5, 2008 (UK); 978-0-345-48335-5 (NA); ISBN 978-0-09-950486-3 (UK)
Chapters 43-47
After breaking a spiderweb attached to Watanuki, Dōmeki has his right eye sealed by the spiderweb's creator. Watanuki gives his right pupil to Yūko so that the spider will leave Dōmeki. Although Dōmeki is angered by Watanuki's action, he is unable to ask Yuko for a wish as it would reverse the previous one. In other chapters, a woman requests Yūko's help because she is being haunted by a photo. After realizing that such photo despicts how the customer killed another woman, Yūko destroys the photo with the price being that the customer must not get her image captured by any recording device, as it would cause the everybody to see the photo. In the last chapter, Dōmeki investigates about how to recover Watanuki's eye, but his grandfather's book containing such information is damaged by a spirit.
08	It seems he really needs to understand... (Hontō ni...., Wakaranai to ne. (lit. He really..., doesn't understand.)) (本当に....、分からないとね。)	February 16, 2006; 978-4-06-372128-7	December 12, 2006 (NA); June 5, 2008 (UK); 978-0-345-48336-2 (NA); ISBN 978-0-09-950487-0 (UK)
Chapters 48-51
As Watanuki learns that spirits hunting his right pupil to increase their powers, Tengu Guardians come to Yūko's shop as Zashiki-Warashi has been kidnapped. Watanuki decides to go to rescue her with Kudakitsune and finds her in a building with Lady Jorōgumo, the ruler from the spiders. Jorōgumo devours Watanuki's right pupil, while he and Kudakitsune escape with Zashiki-Warashi, who wanted to recover his sight. Back in Yūko's shop, Watanuki decides to absorb the half from Dōmeki's right eye which he left to Yūko. Now sharing Dōmeki's right eye, Watanuki becomes able to detect evil spirits, while their vision is sometimes shared.
09	Let's believe in the future. In those children. (Shinjimashō, Mirai o. Ano ko-tachi o) (信じましょう、未来を。あの子達を)	July 14, 2006; 978-4-06-372168-3	July 17, 2007 (NA); June 5, 2008 (UK); 978-0-345-49639-3 (NA); ISBN 978-0-09-950488-7 (UK)
Chapters 52-58
Watanuki unknowingly "buys" a dream to Himawari which becomes premonitory dream in which he is attacked by a giant spirit. The spirit is destroyed by Haruka Dōmeki, Dōmeki's grandfather who was manifested from another dream Watanuki bought to Dōmeki. In the following days, Watanuki meets the spirit from Haruka throughout dreams and befriends him. He also comes in contact with Kohane Tsuyuri, a lonely young medium who wishes to befriend him, as well as a teenager identical to Syaoran who visits Yūko's shop for a short time as he leaves to another world. Learning from Kohane about a woman's soul who cannot go to the afterlife, Yūko plays mahjong at Dōmeki's house with him, Watanuki and Mokona until the spirit manages to leave.
10	Because she needed to enter. (Hairu Hitsuyō ga Atta kara yo (lit. Because it was necessary for her to enter.)) (入る必要があったからよ)	November 17, 2006; 978-4-06-372227-7	September 25, 2007; 978-0-345-49683-6
Chapters 59-70
A cat spirit comes to Yūko as she wishes to recover water from a well, and Watanuki and Dōmeki end up collecting it. Near the well, they find an abandoned mansion as well as a woman who never moves from her chair. In the next days, Watanuki is forced to enter into the mansion as he loses Yūko's cloth for the water jugs. He realizes that the woman is in fact a corpse, and Yūko reveals to him that various of the bad things happening to him is the result of staying in touch with Himawari. While walking in school with Himawari, Watanuki falls from its second floor, almost dying. Haruka manages to save Watanuki in a dream thanks to the payments Himawari, Dōmeki and the other Syaoran made to Yūko. As Watanuki recovers, Himawari tells him how she gives bad luck to people, but Watanuki still wishes to be with her. Yūko later gives Watanuki an egg as a payment for collecting the water which hatches into a small bird that is invulnerable to Himawari's touch.
11	Your name is the same. And the characters that make up a name are extremely important. (Anata no Namae mo sō. Toku ni myōji wa daiji na imi ga aru. (lit. It's the same for your name. The letters have an especially important meaning.)) (貴方の名前もそう。特に名字は大事な意味がある。)	May 17, 2007; 978-4-06-372282-6	March 4, 2008; 978-0-345-50163-9
Chapters 71-82
Watanuki gives the bird to Himawari so that it will bring her happiness, while Yūko gives another egg to Dōmeki as she reveals it was an egg that Sakura gave her in another world and turned into two. In the following days, another girl visits Yūko, claiming her house is filled with scary and strange noises. Yūko gives the client an item to protect the house, but it is later revealed that she was spirit, leading her to be exorcised. Watanuki and Dōmeki meet Kohane, but her mother takes her away from them afraid that her abilities to exorcise will disappear. Watanuki still decides to stay in touch with Kohane, afraid that she will feel lonely.
12	My wish... Hm? (Atashi no Negai....ne. (lit. My wish...is it.)) (あたしの願い....ね。)	October 17, 2007; 978-4-06-372364-9	June 24, 2008; 978-0-345-50565-1
Chapters 83-94
Watanuki enters a dream and meets Sakura, whose soul has been separated from her body after trying to change a future she saw. While talking with Watanuki, Sakura realizes he is similar to the second Syaoran while his name is actually the birth date from Sakura and the other Syaoran. After awakening, Watanuki and Dōmeki pay a visit to Kohane who has been attacked and harassed by other mediums due to having stronger powers and thus differing comments. Kohane's mother thinks they are interfering again and throws burning water at Watanuki, forcing Dōmeki to escape with him. While talking with Sakura again, Watanuki realizes he has no memories regarding his parents, and cannot distinguish dreams from reality. While he is desperate about his, he asks Yūko to tell him her wish as he will try grant it.
13	Even in the most trivial of meetings... ...one changes, body and soul. (Hon no Sasai na Deai de mo, Kokoro to Karada mo Kawatte iku. (lit. With even the slightest encounters, the heart and the body change.)) (ほんの些細な出逢いでも、心と軀も変わっていく。)	June 23, 2008; 978-4-06-375510-7	March 24, 2009; 978-0-345-50566-8
Chapters 95-107
Watanuki learns from Himawari that Kohane has been on TV everyday and she has been attacked again by other people who call her a failure. He and Domeki go to the broadcasting building where another program is being recorded. During the program, Kohane is hit by her mother for her constant mistakes, but Watanuki gets in the middle to protect her. When Watanuki confronts her, Kohane's mother becomes depressive about her current state, while Kohane is taken to Yūko's shop. Kohane wishes her mother be happy, but she wants her happiness first, realizing that ever since having powers, she brought misery to her. Yūko then removes a feather embodied Sakura which gave her the power to exorcise in exchange of deleting all her story in TV.
14	And the stronger that desire grows... ...along with the changing child... ...the future will change as well. (Sono Negai ga Tsuyokereba Tsuyoi Hodo, ano Ko to Tomo ni Mirai mo Kawaru. (lit. The stronger the wish, the more the future will change together with that child.)) (その願いが強ければ強い程、あの子と共に未来も変わる。)	February 17, 2009; 978-4-06-375656-2	October 27, 2009; 978-0-345-51843-9
Chapters 108-120
Kohane starts to live with the fortuneteller, while Yūko is visited by woman who wishes to learn how to cook. Watanuki is told to teach her, and goes to her house to do it. Despite being surprised by her abilities, Dōmeki does not eat her food as he states she forgot to add something important. During another lesson, Watanuki learns the woman is getting married, but does not want to eat her own food, feeling it repulsive. Back at the shop, Yuko reminisces how Watanuki was actually created to replace the second Syaoran in his world when he wished to turn back time. As Syaoran paid his wish becoming the prisoner from sorcerer Fei-Wang Reed, Watanuki paid Yuko with his memories to find his location. Yūko tells her assistants Maru and Moro that her time to leave the shop is near, but she will protect it.
15	Yes, the dream is already ending. (Sō, Yume wa mō Owaru.) (そう、夢はもう終わる。)	June 23, 2009; 978-4-06-375733-0	March 23, 2010; 978-0-345-52112-5
Chapters 121-132
Watanuki requests his student to eat her own meal as he states that it will help understand herself, but she leaves him angered. The next day, Watanuki realizes that Yūko, Maru, Moro and Mokona left the shop for unknown reasons. Despite being concerned about them, Watanuki continues going to his student's house, leaving her his food with hopes that she will eat it. After various days, the woman tastes her own food, and requests to be Watanuki's student again, confessing she hates herself. However, Watanuki is shocked to see that she and other people forgot about Yūko, and rushes to the shop. He enters into another dream where Yūko tells him her death has come, as it was halted various years ago, and now that two people made a decision, she is able to die. Watanuki is desesperated about this, but decides he will stay at the shop to grant Yūko's wish, which she confesses it is for him to continue existing.
16	If a dream is granted if it is wished for enough, then mine is that I want to meet with Yūko again. (Yume wa Tsuyoku Negaeba Kanau nara ore wa, Yūko-san to mata aitai) (夢は強く願えば叶うならおれは、侑子さんとまた逢いたい)	December 12, 2009; 978-4-06-375851-1	October 26, 2010; 978-0-345-52412-6
Chapters 133-143
Maru and Moro tell Watanuki Yūko has died, using her last forces to maintain the shop. After talking to the two Syaorans, Watanuki decides he will become the shop's owner, as he has become unable to leave it. In the next four years, Watanuki continues conceding wishes to people while taking care of Maru, Moro and Mokona, and at the same he is frequently visited by Domeki, his assistant, and Kohane. Watanuki is visited by woman who wants to know why the cat's soul inhabiting her shamisen has become silent. By entering into the shamisen's dream, Watanuki sees its sad soul and finds a plectrum in the shop that the client breaks when playing the shamisen. Realizing the shamisen does not want to be played by anybody else beside its original owner, the woman gives it to Watanuki as her payment.
17	- Yūko-san Wo Wasureru Kamoshirenai... (侑子さんを忘れるかもしれない...)	April 23, 2010; 978-4-06-375906-8	September 13, 2011; 978-0-345-53071-4
Chapters 144-
Lady Jorōgumo comes to the shop as a client who wishes Watanuki to find her a carmesi pearl. While trying to enter into a dream from a person in the building that contains it, Watanuki receives a call from Himawari who has gotten married, but has been unable to go to the shop due to how her bad luck would affect it. In a dream, Watanuki gets in contact with a woman from the building who has been physically abused because of her long lifespan. The Yaobikuni gives Watanuki a pearl when she cries, and he gives it to Jorōgumo. In the chapter, Watanuki gives Dōmeki a thimble as a birthday present which manifests into an arrow to exorcise spirits that may attack him.
18	-: (-)	November 15, 2010; 978-4-06-375979-2	December 13, 2011; 978-0-345-53072-1
Chapters 205-207; Special
After ten years that Watanuki inherited shop, he is taking care of a child-like being he keeps invisible as part of a job. Watanuki requests Dōmeki to exorcise all the spirits that come to attack the child when he removes the shop's barrier, while he uses his power to protect him and Dōmeki. After various struggles, a bridge appears and the child leaves through it. As Watanuki recovers from wounds he suffered, he reveals that child could not be born, and that he is getting another chance to live. In another job, Watanuki meets a woman who wishes to be Dōmeki's girlfriend by any means, but is unable to help her when her strong feelings cause her soul to be split from her body. In the last chapter, Watanuki is visited by the second Syaoran who in contrast to Watanuki, is unable to stay in the same dimension for a few days as a payment the two made to protect each other after Yūko's death.
19	-: (-)	March 9, 2011; 978-4-06-376039-2	February 21, 2012; 978-0-345-53126-1
Chapters 208-213
As Setsubun comes in the lunar calendar, Watanuki makes a spell to obtain chrysanthemum wine and give it to his friends. He also continues doing jobs in the shop such as discover the identity of a decoration by meeting its spirit, and helping the soul of a deceased woman find her lover's soul. Over a hundred years later, Watanuki has a dream which Yūko "left" him, in which she makes him realize he has become powerful enough to leave the shop. However, Watanuki decides to stay there until he finds the meets the real Yūko with Dōmeki's great-grandson being his assistant.

=== xxxHolic Rei ===
No.	Original release date	Original ISBN	English release date	English ISBN
1	October 23, 2013	978-4-06-376897-8	April 29, 2014	978-1612629391
Chapters 1-12
Watanuki keeps working for Yuko to grant people's wish in her store. Two women each of them carrying a doll that represent their other "friend". One of them "stole" the other's boyfriend and for this, she feels that she must suffer, using the doll to hurt her. Each time they come a greater damage is shown to these dolls, which shows that they are hurting each other, resulting in each other's death. As Watanuki learns of this, he continuously hears an unknown voice asking for his help in granting a wish. Watanuki finds Yuko's behaviour strange when returning to the shop but she comforts him when Watanuki believes that she and Domeki re waiting for him to make an important decision.
2	April 23, 2014	978-4-06-376966-1	November 25, 2014	978-1612625843
Chapters 13-24
A young yosuzume appears in Yuko's shop and asks Watanuki to save a child. Domeki accompanies Watanuki through a journey at night where there they find another spirit, yamainu who wants to have his wish granted. Through an offering from the two teenagers, the divinity is satisfied and abandons the area. Upon returning to the ship, Yuko reveals that both spirits are married and departed together and are given gifts to return to an unknown area. Watanuki declines the offer though. Watanuki later is confused about people exchanging money to collect 300 yens, including Himawari, due to the health of each person growing worse to the point of causing a curse. Watanuki becomes confused with his own knowledge of occultism. He finds it odd that he is acting like Yuko who keeps waiting for his student to make a decision.
3	August 20, 2014	978-4-06-377047-6	April 28, 2015	978-1612625850
Chapters 25-38
Watanuki receives a call from a person who calls him by his first name but collapses. Yuko, Domeki and Himawari are revealed to keep waiting together for him to make an important decision much to his own confusion. A young woman visits the shop, expressing fears of being cursed during the exchange of coins but Yuko instead convinces her that the other person wants to please her. Watanuki then starts having visions of a bird and sees multiple type of flowers that cause him to act like Yuko again. He then has another call from the same person calling through his first name. Watanuki receiver a cage from a friendly woman. Upon returning to the shop, Watanuki realizes that he is living in an alternate world where Yuko did not die and had to collect three items with Haruka's aid. Watanuki says farewell to Yuko in grief and returns to being her successor alongside the items he collected to provide for Syaoran.
4	October 6, 2016	978-4-06-393025-2	August 15, 2017	978-1612625867
Chapters 39-52
Watanuki sends Syaoran the three items he gathered in the parallel world to change Syaoran's fate where he would never open his eyes. Meanwhile, the adult Domeki gives Watanuki a moving amber his college professor requested him to investigate. In a dream, Watanuki interacts with Haruka about the amber. As he investigates the amber, Watanuki receives a previous customer who gives him back a shamisen following an interaction with the Jorogumo. In compensation for his services, Watanuki receives a crimson pearl. Another returning customer is Ame-warashi who needs the pearl to protect the spirit of Zashiki-warashi. As Watanuki is concerned about Zashiki-warashi's disappearance, he has a vision of Syaoran meeting his clone through a dream. This causes him to see a vision of Yuko. After this, Syaoran who sends him back the cage which Watanuki uses as a replacement for the pearl to provide for Ame-Awarashi's ai. Watanuki exchanges the amber from Domeki's professor in order to keep it. The volume ends with Watanuki meeting the spirit Neko Musume is concerned bout Ame-Awarashi's state to the point of being almost a shuka.
5	November 6, 2025	978-4-06-541422-4	—	—
Chapters 53-64
"The zashiki-warashi, who can only survive in pure air, is weakening." Watanuki, acting shopkeeper, is trying to save a zashiki-warashi at the request of the rain goddess. He tries to gather the necessary items to help her, but can't find them, and the zashiki-warashi is about to transform into a curse that can grant any wish. The curse's power is strong, making it the object of desire for many, and many powerful individuals are gathering to acquire it. Among them is rumored to be Yuuko, the "Dimensional Witch" whom Watanuki has been longing to reunite with!? Faced with a reality he doesn't want to believe, what choice will Watanuki make!?
6	November 6, 2026	978-4-06-545519-7	—	—
