= Ninja Girls =

Manga by Tanaka Hosana

- Cover of Ninja Girls first volume as released by Kodansha

乱飛乱外 (Rappi Rangai)
- Manga
- Written by: Tanaka Hosana
- Published by: Kodansha
- English publisher: NA: Del Rey Manga (former) Kodansha USA
- Magazine: Monthly Shōnen Sirius
- Original run: 2005 – 2011
- Volumes: 9

Ninja Girls (Japanese: 乱飛乱外, Hepburn: Rappi Rangai), is a manga by Tanaka Hosana. The manga sets during the civil war in Japan and revolves around a boy named Raizou Katana who is loathed for having a short horn on his forehead. He saves a female ninja, who then tells him that she's his servant and he is an emperor, and she introduces him to her clan of female ninjas who are devoted to restoring his family name.

== Plot ==
The story revolves around a boy named Raizou Katana. He was living in a village where the villagers despised him for having a horn on his head. When he saves the life of Kagari (a kunoichi), he discovers that he is the illegitimate heir to the fallen Katana clan and must revive his household to its original state. Together with fellow Kunoichi Kisarabi and Himemaru, they set out to revive the clan by marrying Raizou to a princess of another household and borrowing their power. Throughout the series, Raizo eventually wins over several princesses but ends up running away due to various misunderstandings. All the while, a group led by the mysterious Kabuki Seigan also attempt to gain control over the other households, only to meet with failure through the intervention of Raizou and his followers.

== Characters ==
Raizou (雷蔵, Raizō)
A young boy born with a small horn on his head, which identifies him as the heir of the Katana household. Due to his horn, he has been treated as an outcast for most of his life.
Kagari (かがり)
A Kunoichi devoted to the restoration of the Katana household. She can use the special technique Shintaigo, which makes her body as tough as steel and grants her super strength provided the man she loves is watching her. She seems to hold great feelings for Raizou.
Kisarabi (如火)
The second kunoichi working for Raizou to rebuild the Katana household and the apparent leader of the trio. She is a very serious woman, skilled in the use of a variety of firearms and possesses the special technique Rasengan, which allows her to increases her already formidable sniping abilities. Her house revival plan involves having Raizou marry a princess of a powerful house in order to use that house's power to destroy their enemies.
Himemaru (姫丸)
The third kunoichi, in actuality a crossdresser who gave up the life of a Samurai because it was too demanding. He uses a shibari technique called Higyaku no Shibari, which wraps ropes around the target in a way that makes it painful to move. He also dabbles in medicine (to be precise poisons) and can control people using music. Although initially wanting to marry Raizou in order to gain wealth and fame, he was soon charmed by him. His house revival plan involves seducing other lords in order to make them submit to the Katana household.
Mother
Raizo's deceased mother, who communicates with her son through her mortuary tablet, often showing disapproval by falling on or striking him, or satisfaction through a gleam.

== Publication ==
Ninja Girls was serialized in Monthly Shōnen Sirius magazine. It was collected into nine volumes by Kodansha, and has been licensed in English by Del Rey translated by Andria Cheng, and in Traditional Chinese by Sharp Point Press. Kodansha USA will keep publishing the series in 2011.

=== Volume list ===
| No. | Original release date | Original ISBN | English release date | English ISBN |
|---|---|---|---|---|
| 1 | March 23, 2006 | 978-4-06-373019-7 | August 25, 2009 | 978-0-345-51242-0 |
| 2 | August 23, 2006 | 978-4-06-373034-0 | December 29, 2009 | 978-0-345-51243-7 |
| 3 | February 23, 2007 | 978-4-06-373058-6 | June 22, 2010 | 978-0-345-51244-4 |
| 4 | October 23, 2007 | 978-4-06-373091-3 | November 16, 2010 | 978-0-345-51245-1 |
| 5 | June 23, 2008 | 978-4-06-373120-0 | May 24, 2011 | 978-1-935429-65-4 |
| 6 | January 23, 2009 | 978-4-06-373152-1 | July 12, 2011 | 978-1-935429-66-1 |
| 7 | November 20, 2009 | 978-4-06-373195-8 | September 27, 2011 | 978-1-935429-67-8 |
| 8 | September 9, 2010 | 978-4-06-376233-4 | November 15, 2011 | 978-1-935429-68-5 |
| 9 | May 9, 2011 | 978-4-06-376268-6 | March 6, 2012 | 978-1-61262-070-1 |

== Reception ==
Ninja Girls volume 1 debuted sixth on The New York Times manga bestseller list for the week of August 23–29, 2009. The following week, Ninja Girls volume 1 slipped to eighth position. Joseph Luster, writing for Otaku USA, felt that the manga was in an awkward position: "too fan-servicey for some, and not enough for others".

Comicbookbin.com's Leroy Douresseaux compares the tone of the manga to Strawberry 100%, and feels that the manga is full of "comic violence that is brutal and bloody or innuendo defined by female ninja (kunoichi) in some state of undress." Activeanime.com's Davey C. Jones enjoyed the "voluptuous" character designs of the girls. Matthew Alexander found the character of the spirit tablet imbued with the protagonist's mother's spirit to be very funny, and found the protagonist to be a "likeable character" who "cares more about the feelings of those around him than he does about his own wellbeing". Dan Polley felt the first volume had "potential", and that the secondary characters were intriguing.
