= List of Vampire Knight chapters =

First volume of Vampire Knight, released in Japan by Hakusensha on July 5, 2005

This is a list of volumes and chapters for the manga series Vampire Knight by Matsuri Hino. The series premiered in the January 2005 issue of LaLa magazine and has officially ended. The individual chapters have been collected and published in tankōbon volumes by Hakusensha, with the series concluding with nineteen volumes released in Japan as of November 2013. Vampire Knight was adapted into a twenty-six episode anime series by Studio Deen. The first season aired in Japan on TV Tokyo between April 7, 2008, and June 30, 2008. The second season, titled Vampire Knight Guilty, aired between October 6, 2008, and December 29, 2008. Two drama CDs and two Japanese light novels have also been created based on the manga series.

The series was licensed for an English language release in North America by Viz Media. In addition to publishing the individual volumes, the series was serialized in Viz's Shojo Beat manga anthology from July 2006, until the magazine was discontinued in 2009. The series is licensed for English release in Singapore by Chuang Yi. and the Chuang Yi editions are being reprinted in Australia and New Zealand by Madman Entertainment.

== Volumes ==
No.	Original release date	Original ISBN	Australian/New Zealand North American release date	Australian/New Zealand North American ISBN
1	July 10, 2005	978-4-592-18301-3	February 10, 2007; January 2, 2007	978-981-269-421-8; 978-1-4215-0822-1
1st Night: "Cross Academy Night Class"; 2nd Night: "Zero's Secret"; 3rd Night: "The Vampire of Vampires"; 4th Night: "The Promise..."; 5th Night: "My Dear Girl"; "Night Class Side"; Editor's Notes
Yuki Cross goes on patrol, and spots two Day Class students trying to take pictures of the Night Class. One of them was hurt badly from falling, and Hanabusa Aido and Akatsuki Kain come to the scene after they smelled blood. Yuki tries to defend the two girls, but Aido is overcome in his hunger for blood and bites her hand, which had been cut on a branch previously. Zero Kiryu, the other guardian, appears and stops Aido, while Kaname Kuran, the President of the Night Class, gives them detention. Later on, Zero gets mysteriously ill and skips prefect duty on St. Xocolatl Day. It is revealed that Zero is actually a vampire, and that a Pureblood vampire had bitten him four years ago. He bites Yuki, overcome with his vampiric urges for blood. Afterwards he tries to run away from the Academy, but Yuki will not let him go. In the end, he gives her a gun, saying to shoot and kill him if he ever loses control of himself.
2	December 2, 2005	978-4-592-18302-0	March 14, 2007; May 1, 2007	978-981-269-422-5; 978-1-4215-1130-6
6th Night: "Outside Cross Academy"; 7th Night: "Night Party"; 8th Night: "The Forbidden Act"; 9th Night: "Choices Made"; Bonus Story: "Sometimes There Are Lazy Days Too"; Bonus Story: "I Must've Been Born Under the 'Victim of Circumstances' Star..."; "Vampires Covered in Blood Are Prohibited from Entering This Page!!"; Editor's Notes
Yuki and Zero go into town to do some shopping for the headmaster, and they are attacked by a fiendish vampire called a "Level E". Two Night Class students, Takuma Ichijo and Senri Shiki, come just on time and slay it, and invite Yuki and Zero to their dormitory at midnight to find out why they killed one of their own kind. So they go, and are both surprised when it is revealed that it was actually Ichijo's birthday party. Even Kaname attends, and he tells Yuki to sit beside him to be safe. There, Yuki learns that Kaname is one of the few remaining Pureblood vampires - vampires that inherited the powers from the original vampires themselves. Zero leaves, and Yuki finds him collapsed near the pool, and he tries to drink her blood for a second time. But before he can, a vampire hunter, and Zero's old master, named Toga Yagari shoots him. Zero is locked away in one of the Headmaster's rooms to recover, but Yuki realizes that he can recover quickly if he drinks human blood, so she lets him drink her blood.
3	April 5, 2006	978-4-592-18303-7	April 10, 2007; October 2, 2007	978-981-269-423-2; 978-1-4215-1324-9
10th Night: "The Lord of the Moon Dormitory"; 11th Night: "Memories of Snow, Blood, and Tenderness"; 12th Night: "We Were Powerless Back Then"; 13th Night: "He Who Pulls the Trigger"; 14th Night: "The Late Arrival: A New Student"; Side Story: "The Warmth That Slipped from Her Palm. And..."; Editor's Notes
Kaname sinks into depression after finding out about Yuki and Zero's forbidden act. Ichijo's scary grandfather, Asato Ichijo (known as "Ichio") abruptly visits Cross Academy, claiming to be having a casual visit with his grandson, but he appears to have a hidden agenda with Kaname. Ichijo asks Yuki why Kaname is so depressed, which leads to multiple flashbacks about her past, from Yuki's arrival at the headmaster's house ten years ago, to four years ago when Zero first started living with her and the headmaster, to Yuki witnessing Kaname bite Ruka after she convinced him not to bite Yuki. Zero almost succumbs to drinking her blood while she is sleeping, Kaname witnesses the scene. Kaname tells Zero that the only reason why he is letting him live is because Zero will not betray her. Zero hunts down a level E serial killer who almost kills Yuki. A mysterious new Night Class student named Maria Kurenai arrives at Cross Academy. Zero pulls his gun out at her, having flashbacks about the woman who turned him into a vampire. Kaname tells Ichijo that these events are not coincidence, and that he has arranged it that way.
4	October 5, 2006	978-4-592-18304-4	May 6, 2007; April 1, 2008	978-981-269-539-0; 978-1-4215-1563-2
15th Night: "Tempest on the Board"; 16th Night: "Motives, Hidden Agendas"; 17th Night: "A Price to Pay"; 18th Night: "Hope"; 19th Night: "Wild Gears"; Extra Story: "It's Too Scary To Ask 'Why Only Me?'"; Editor's Notes
Maria Kurenai walks around the school grounds during the day, and is followed by a flustered Ichijo. Yuki goes to talk to Maria, but Zero tells her to stay away from her. Kaname asks Maria why she has come to the academy, and she confirms that she is actually a Pureblood controlling the mind of the real Maria. Zero helps Yuki with her homework, but begins to act weird. He runs off to the Moon Dormitory, and he points his gun at Maria, who says that she has been waiting for him, and that she is really Shizuka Hio, the one who turned Zero into a vampire. Yuki goes to help Zero, but she is stopped by Kaname, who erases all of her memories of that night. She wakes up the next day, and when she sees Maria she remembers what had happened. She asks Maria what she did with Zero, and Maria tells Yuki that to save Zero, she would either have to give herself up, or kill Kaname for her. At the ball later that night, Yuki asks Kaname why he erased her memories, and he said that he only did it to protect her, and they hug. She apologizes, and runs to the Moon Dorm to give herself up to Maria. Maria's assistant, Ichiru, brings in her real body, and she switches her mind back to her original self, Shizuka Hio. She prepares to bite Yuki, but Zero comes in. He shoots her, and she walks away to tend to her wounds while her assistant fights Zero. It is revealed that her assistant is actually Zero's twin brother Ichiru. While Shizuka tends to her wounds, Kaname comes in and penetrates her heart with his hand, killing her to protect Yuki.
5	April 5, 2007	978-4-592-18305-1	September 12, 2007; September 2, 2008	978-981-269-954-1; 978-1-4215-1954-8
20th Night: "Game Over"; 21st Night: "Guilty"; 22nd Night: "Things That Have Changed and Things That Haven't"; 23rd Night: "Lost Lamb"; 24th Night: "A 'Minor' Incident"; "Vampires Covered in Blood Are Prohibited from Entering This Page!!"; Editor's Notes
Zero smells blood, and a panicking Ichiru runs to Shizuka's side. Kaname had disappeared, so Ichiru assumed that Zero was the one who killed Shizuka because he had shot her with his gun. Aido, who had been eavesdropping on Kaname and Shizuka, was the sole witness of her death. Ichiru flees angrily, vowing revenge against his twin brother Zero. The Night Class reports to the Vampire Senate that it was Zero who killed Shizuka Hio, and they send assassins to take care of him. Kaname interrupts, and stands against the Senate. He, Ichijo and Akatsuki Kain go to the Senate itself to testify for Zero, while Aido runs away to the Sun Dormitory because he was upset about witnessing Shizuka's death. After watching Zero drink Yuki's blood, however, he went back angrily. Later, a Day Class student collapses, with fang marks on her neck. Kaname openly suspects Zero, and Yuki shouts at him, saying that she will not talk to him again until he admits that Zero is innocent. Kaname discovers the culprit, while Zero has a vision of himself accidentally killing Yuki. Yuki asks him what's wrong, and he, rejoiced that she was still alive, leans in to kiss her, but backs away.
6	October 5, 2007	978-4-592-18306-8	June 11, 2008; March 10, 2009	978-981-276-352-5; 978-1-4215-2353-8
25th Night: "Vampire Soirée"; 26th Night: "Kaname..."; 27th Night: "The Archives"; 28th Night: "The Kuran Family"; 29th Night: "Quickening"; Extra Story: "Kaname-sama and I, Prior to the Night Class"; Editor's Notes
Zero stops the kiss, saying that he had a bad dream. But Yuki had already figured out what he was trying to do, and she avoided him all day. She and her best friend Yori go shopping, and they are interrupted by a little boy, who asks Yuki to help him find his mother. She helps the little boy, and he leads her to an abandoned building. She sees that he has different colored eyes, one blue eye and one red eye, and he drains her energy. The Night Class discovers her unconscious, and takes her to safety. Ichijo explains that the abandoned building was being used for Vampire Banquet, hosted by Aido's father. Curious, she sneaks out, and sees all of the vampire parents introducing their daughters to Kaname. A female vampire, one of the last remaining Purebloods named Sara Shirabuki, tells them to leave Kaname alone, and she and Kaname talk. Yuki gets jealous and runs back into the room, where she starts to cry. Kaname comes in and asks her if she wants to become a vampire, and she says yes. But he claims that he did not mean it, and takes her back home. During the long vacation, Yuki tries to find out her past, and goes with Zero and the headmaster to the Vampire Hunter Society. They find a book, but as soon as she turns to page containing the information she is looking for, the page sets itself on fire. Aido asks Kaname about his parents, and Kaname says that they were murdered. Back in Yuki's room, Yuki feels guilty about always dragging Zero into her problems and he bites her. When Yuki notices he is drinking more than usual, she tells him to stop and when he does not, she pushes him away. He then reveals that Yuki is the reason he is alive and he does not mind being dragged into her problems because he always drinks her blood even though that is a sin. She then cries in his arms for the rest of the night. At the same time, Shiki is taken to the Vampire Senate, where he meets the little boy with the different coloured eyes. The little boy collapses, and Shiki's father rises out of a pool of blood. It ends with the mysterious man asking Shiki to lend him his body.
7	April 5, 2008	978-4-592-18307-5	October 10, 2008; August 4, 2009	978-981-276-578-9; 978-1-4215-2676-8
30th Night: "For Whom the Blood Flows"; 31st Night: "The Path to the Answer"; 32nd Night: "The Make-Believe Sandbox"; 33rd Night: "A Pureblood's Lover"; 34th Night: "Bloody World"; Side Story: "Cross Family Vacation"; Editor's Notes
After the vacation ends, Yuki asks Kaname to tell her about her past, but he evades her questioning, and confesses his love for her. Zero, wanting to get some answers himself, goes to the Moon Dormitory and confronts Kaname. The two fight, and Zero ends up drinking Kaname's blood. In the meantime, Ichiru comes to the academy, ushered in by the Vampire Senate itself. Yuki asks Kaname once more about her past, and he says that he will tell her if she becomes his lover (as in girlfriend). The Night Class follows Yuki around to protect her, and she has a picnic with Kaname. She demands, one last time, to know about her past, and she begins to have flashbacks. Overcome, she collapses. Ichijo and Shiki return to the academy, and they immediately confront Kaname. The man possessing Shiki confirms that he is really Kaname's uncle, Rido Kuran, and that he has come to take Yuki. Kaname tells Rido that he will never touch Yuki, and flees. Yuki wakes up and has a frightening hallucination, and she attacks Zero, who says that she can do whatever she wants to him because she is the victim, not him. She shoves him away, and cries. Kaname climbs in through her window, and takes her away. It ends with Kaname sinking his fangs into Yuki's neck.
8	October 10, 2008	978-4-592-18308-2	February 10, 2009; November 3, 2009	978-981-276-758-5; 978-1-4215-3073-4
35th Night: "Yuki"; 36th Night: "The Unwanted"; 37th Night: "Like a Sin"; 38th Night: "Conspiracy"; Bonus Story: "The Scarlet Cherry Blossoms Scattered Quietly"; Bonus Story: "The Secret I Don't Know"; "Vampires Covered in Blood Are Prohibited from Entering This Page!!"; Editor's Notes
Kaname turns Yuki into a vampire (a pure blood vampire, since her mother sealed her vampiric powers), and Zero interrupts. He points his gun at Kaname in an angry rage, and prepares to shoot. But Yuki protects Kaname, declaring that he is her brother. She faints, and Kaname tells Zero that he would be happier if he was born as Yuki's real brother. He takes Yuki to the Moon Dormitory, and leaves Aido and Kain to take care of her while she goes through her transformation to go back to true pure blood vampire (her true self). In the meantime, Rima Toya confronts Rido, and they have a battle. Rido critically injures Rima, but she manages to ward him out of Shiki's body. Yuki wakes up and smells Rima's blood, scared at first that the scent of blood was Zero's. She, Aido and Kain go to the Sun Dormitory, and she goes to talk to Zero. He points his gun at the door and rejects her. Kaname goes to Rido's coffin, and opens it with Ichiru's help. He stabs a sword through his hand and Rido's body, giving Rido the blood he needs to regenerate. Ichiru asks why Kaname cannot personally kill Rido, and Kaname reveals that he is actually the ancient ancestor of Kuran.
9	November 5, 2008	978-4-592-18309-9	August 10, 2009; February 2, 2010	978-981-276-802-5; 978-1-4215-3172-4
39th Night: "The Academy in Turmoil"; 40th Night: "The Arms That Held the Original Sin"; 41st Night: "Artemis"; 42nd Night: "Bloody Rose"; 43rd Night: "Vampire Night"; Editor's Notes
Zero is imprisoned as Rido begins to revive slowly, and his army of Level E vampires approach the academy. Ichiru, fatally wounded, shoots Zero, and it is revealed that Ichiru was on Zero's side all along, and that he was plotting to kill Rido, the one who made Shizuka Hio murder their parents. Ichiru tells Zero to eat him to become stronger, and he reluctantly does. Kaname approaches Yuki and tells her that it is time to flee, but she refuses. She kisses him and tells him that she will be fine, so he leaves while she grabs her Artemis rod, which transforms into a giant scythe. Aido battles against the Level E vampires, and he sees Rido, who hypnotizes him to sacrifice himself to become Rido's food. Yuki jumps in and saves him, unaffected by Rido's controlling powers, being a Pureblood herself. She begins to battle her Uncle Rido, and Zero comes in, having developed a new power to control the metallic vines of Bloody Rose which has attached to his body. They both battle while Kaname goes to the Vampire Senate, and forces them all to brutally kill themselves by ripping off their heads. The battle with Rido ends as Yuki stabs him in the heart during a moment of weakness, and Zero blows him into tiny little fragments. Kaname goes to kill Ichio, but Ichijo steps in, wanting to kill Ichio himself. Back at Cross Academy, Zero tells Yuki that he intends to kill all of the Purebloods, including her. She tells him that she can not die yet, and raises her scythe, ready to fight.
10	June 5, 2009	978-4-592-18310-5	December 10, 2009; June 1, 2010	978-981-276-881-0; 978-1-4215-3569-2
44th Night: "Obsession"; 45th Night: "Each In Their Place"; 46th Night: "Enemies"; 47th Night: "Each On Their Path"; 48th Night: "The Wishes of Unrequited Lovers"; Extra Story: "A Lady Talks About Her Love"; Extra Story: "Cross's Child-Care Diary, Part One"; Extra Story: "Cross's Child-Care Diary, Part Two"; "CD Report"; Editor's Notes
Zero contemplates his relationship with Yuki and eventually tells her that he would not have minded if she had killed him. Meanwhile, Maria Kurenai spies on Kaname and witnesses his destruction of the Vampire Senate. She notifies her parents, who informs the rest of vampire society. At the academy, the headmaster battles the Vampire Hunters and kills the Association President. He is then arrested. At the fallen Senate building, Sara Shirabuki arrives to find an unconscious Takuma Ichijo, and she apprehends him to find out more about Kaname. Meanwhile, Kaname arrives back at the academy and gets into a fight with Zero, but Yuki stops it before Kaname could deliver the final blow to Zero. Kaname leaves them alone for a few minutes, and Zero kisses Yuki. They then go down their own separate paths, with Zero vowing to kill Yuki the next time they meet. Yuki reunites with Kaname and they both leave the Academy together, the both of them spotting Zero carrying Ichiru's body on their way. Later on, Aido, Ruka, and Kain are on the train so they can try to find Kaname and Yuki. Kain remembers some of his past experiences with Kaname and wonders to himself if the day when he'll walk down his own path will ever come.
11	December 4, 2009	978-4-592-19131-5	February 24, 2010; December 7, 2010	978-9-814-29770-7; 978-1-4215-3790-0
49th Night: "Tonight, I Shall Hold You With My Bloodstained Hands"; 50th Night: "Deep in that Dark Forest"; 51st Night: "Dilemma"; 52nd Night: "Beasts Madly in Love"; 53rd Night: "Reunion"; "Vampires Covered in Blood Are Prohibited from Entering This Page!!"; Editor's Notes
Ichijo wakes up and finds himself in the care of Sara Shirabuki, who saved his life after he tried sacrificing himself to kill Ichio. She asks him to tell her all he knows about Kaname, and she tears at his flesh when he refuses. Meanwhile, Yuki returns to the Kuran mansion with Kaname, and he admits all of his past wrongdoings to her. He tries to push her away, but she asks for him to taint her as well. They kiss and Kaname bites her. After that there is a one year time-skip, and the focus changes to Zero, who saves a little girl from being kidnapped by some ex-human vampires. He returns to his city apartment shortly after, and he is greeted by the headmaster, who was released from the Hunter Society. The headmaster informs Zero of a meeting that is about to take place between the Hunters and the vampires, with Zero as the future leader of the Hunter Society and Kaname as the future leader of the vampire society. Back at the Kuran mansion, Yuki studies with Aido, who is her teacher. During Kaname's absence, she craves both his and Zero's blood, and she wanders around the mansion confusedly. She feels guilty for having feelings for both Kaname and Zero, and she asks Kaname if she can stay by his side forever anyway. Meanwhile, the Hunters continue to set up for the meeting and the party afterwards, and Kain and Ruka visit the Hanadagi family to see if everything is fine. At the school, Zero's old friend Kaito is hired as a teacher, and he meets Yori. The Hunters and the vampires have their meeting, and afterwards Zero discovers that Kaito snuck Yori into the party. Kaito says that if the vampires notice there is a 'lamb' at the party and attack her, Zero will have the perfect excuse to kill Yuki.
12	July 5, 2010	978-4-592-19132-2	October 19, 2010; June 7, 2011	978-981-4323-63-5; 978-1-4215-3938-6
54th Night: "Enemy of Purebloods"; 55th Night: "The Beginning of the Beginning"; 56th Night: "Queen"; 57th Night: "Two Weapons"; 58th Night: "Sacrifice"; Bonus Story: "A Load of Nonsense from a Certain Photo Lover"; "Vampires Covered in Blood Are Prohibited from Entering This Page!!"; Editor's Notes
Yuki and Zero lock eyes, but they turn away from each other. Yori wanders around the ballroom, and Sara Shirabuki finds and talks to her. She tries to lure Yori away, but is stopped by Zero, who grabs her wrist. Yuki squeezes through the throng to get to the fracas, and she convinces Zero to let go of Sara. Zero takes Yori away, while Sara asks Yuki if she wants to be her friend. Kaname arranges for Yuki to meet privately with Yori and Zero, but Zero declines. At the party, Sara Shirabuki's Pureblood fiance, Ouri, goes missing, as well as a vampire hunter. A scent of blood suddenly fills the air, and Yuki goes to investigate while Kain finds the remains of the dead Pureblood hidden underneath a tablecloth. Yuki finds Zero and Kaien investigating the body of the dead hunter, who committed suicide after becoming a vampire. Yuki wants to find out the truth, but she is rushed out of the ballroom. Meanwhile, Sara and Ichijo leave, and Sara reveals to Ichijo that she turned the hunter into a vampire and forced her to kill Ouri for her. Sara declares that one day she will become Queen. At the mansion, Yuki meets with the crowd that had gathered outside, and she is punished by Kaname for being so careless. Both Yuki and Zero ponder on the incident at the ball, and Zero believes that it is just the beginning. Later on, Kaname gives Yuuki Artemis back, and Yuki decides to go out on her own. She is accompanied by Aido, and visits the Pureblood Isaya Shoto. She tells Shoto that since Kurans are the only Purebloods able to wield hunter weapons, she will personally end the lives of any Pureblood who wishes to die. Yuki leaves, and Kaien walks out of the curtains. He and Isaya were apparently friends for over fifty years. At the Dahlia Academy Girls School, Sara goes on a tour with Ichijo, and ends up turning a group of human girls into her vampire servants. Zero and Kaito go to investigate, but Sara insists that Zero cannot do anything to her because she turned them consensually. Back at the Kuran mansion, Kaname sits on a coffin while talking to Rido, who barely managed to survive. Kaname asks Rido why he sacrificed Haruka and Juri's baby, who was also named Kaname like him.
13	December 3, 2010	978-4-592-19133-9	May 10, 2011; October 4, 2011	978-9-814-34100-4; 978-1-4215-4081-8
59th Night: "Tombstones"; 60th Night: "A Familiar Scent"; 61st Night: "Beyond the Doors"; 62nd Night: "Beyond the Memories"; 63rd Night: "The Hunter and the Ancestor"; Bonus Story: "A Certain Ill-Reputed Hunter"; Editor's Notes
Zero gets a few days off and visits his family's graves. Yuki stops by the cemetery to visit her old nurse and runs into trouble when another Pureblood, Toma, attacks her, Yuki is badly injured, but Zero enters the scene and scares away the Pureblood. When Yuki falls unconscious, Zero takes her to a hunter safe house to recover with Aido trailing them. Yuki awakens and almost bites Zero. Kaname's bats take Yuki back home, and Kaname finally reveals he is not her brother. Yuki drinks Kaname's blood and receives the memories of his awakening and his distant past as the ancestor. Kaname's past reveals the rise of vampires after a global cataclysm ten thousand years ago, and the trouble caused by the rising number of vampires turning humans into their servants and bringing them under their control. Yuki sees the woman that Kaname used to love. Meanwhile, Aido is captured by the Hunter Society in the hopes that he can reveal important information about Kaname. Zero and Aido discuss the origins of the Vampire Hunters; a female Pureblood sacrificed herself to give the original Vampire Hunters their powers. Kaname's memories reveal that the woman he cared about was the one who sacrificed herself.
14	June 3, 2011	978-4-592-19134-6	October 10, 2011; July 3, 2012	978-9-814-34136-3; 978-1-4215-4218-8
64th Night: "A Proposition at the End of a Thousand Nights"; 65th Night: "The Vicious Princess"; 66th Night: "Once More From the Beginning"; 67th Night: "A Sword That Cuts Everything"; 68th Night: "Why?"; "Vampires Covered in Blood Are Prohibited from Entering This Page!!"; Editor's Notes
Yuki witnesses the origins of the Vampire Hunters in Kaname's memories before waking up. Meanwhile, Sara Shirabuki kidnaps the president of a pharmaceutical company, and Ichijo is made aware of the fact that she is slowly creating a legion of obedient ex-human vampires. Kaname and Yuki decide to start their relationship over from the beginning. Despite Yuki's protests, Kaname leaves the mansion to do what he says he had hesitated to do. Yuki tails Kaname, and ends up encountering Kaien Cross and Aido. Sara Shirabuki, using the power she obtained from Ouri, breaks into the Hanadagi family's castle and steals the heart of the Head of the family. Hanadagi attempts to eat Aido's father to regain his strength, but Hanadagi is murdered by Kaname. Yuki, Aido, and Kaien enter the castle just as Kaname decapitates Aido's father, to their surprise. Kaname says that he is done hesitating, and apologizes to Yuuki before turning into bats and flying away. Yuki chases after him, but Kaien prevents her from leaving. Kaname is labeled as a dangerous vampire by the Hunter's Association, and Yuki, as Kaname's fiancee, is taken into their custody.
15	December 5, 2011	978-4-592-19135-3	November 6, 2012	978-1-4215-4947-7
69th Night: "I am Yuki Kuran"; 70th Night: "Collaborators"; 71st Night: "The New Night Class"; 72nd Night: "The Taste of Blood Tablets"; 73rd Night: "My Relationship with Zero"; Bonus Story: "Secrets"; Editor's Notes
Yuki is taken to the headquarters of the Hunter Society. There, she is questioned by Cross and Yagari, but she refuses to disclose any information about Kaname. Kaito takes a wounded child back to the headquarters, and Yuki is given permission to help find the culprit. Afterwards, Yuki visits members of the vampire aristocracy to introduce herself as the new head of the Kuran family. Yuki declares that she wants to re-establish the Night Class at Cross Academy, and Shiki, Rima, and Aido collaborate with her to bring it into fruition. Sara Shirabuki decides that she wants to enter the new Night Class with her servants. Meanwhile, as the new Night Class arrives at Cross Academy, Kaname kills the Head of the Hio family. Yuki hears of trouble going on in town, and she, Zero, and Maria go to stop it. Maria tells Yuki that she wants Zero for herself. Yuki talks with Ichijo about Kaname, but Sara uses her spider familiar to spy on them. Sara intervenes in their conversation just as Ichijo warns Yuki about the new blood tablets that are about to go on the market. Yuki has troubles containing her thirst for blood, so Zero takes Yuki to a secluded area where she can drink his blood.
16	May 2, 2012	978-4-592-19136-0	March 5, 2013	978-1-4215-5154-8
74th Night: "The Pureblood Vampire's Motive"; 75th Night: "Puppet"; 76th Night: "Tablet in the Darkness"; 77th Night: "Yuki and Sara"; 78th Night: "Contamination"; Editor's Notes
Yuki drinks Zero's blood. Later, Cross mentions how Zero is no longer in a rush to kill Kaname, and Zero claims it is because of Kaname's decision to kill off all of the Purebloods. Kaname, along with Ruka and Kain, attempt to assassinate Isaya Shoto. However, he is intercepted by Cross, who aims his sword at Kaname. Kaname claims that he will crush anyone who gets in his way, including Cross. While Cross is gone, Yagari tells Zero and Yuki that the rest of the Vampire Hunters support Kaname in his quest to eliminate the Purebloods. Kaname tells Cross that his next target is Sara Shirabuki. Meanwhile, at Cross Academy, the vampires begin acting strangely due to the brand new blood tablets. Yuki confronts Sara and she admits that she created the new blood tablets using her own blood. Two vampires under the influence of Sara's contaminated tablets attack Yuki, and Yuki discovers that her own blood works as an antidote. Yuki starts confiscating the new blood tablets, while Sara tells Zero a secret. Later, Yuki discovers from Hanadagi's former servant that Sara was the one who attacked him. Before she can react, Zero tells Yuki that he will not let her lay her hands on Sara. Zero tells Yuki the secret that Sara shared with him - that Kaname was responsible for orchestrating the death of Zero's family - just as Kaname arrives at Cross Academy.
17	December 5, 2012	978-4-592-19137-7	November 5, 2013	978-1-4215-5701-4
79th Night: "Rift"; 80th Night: "A Confession of Love"; 81st Night: "Those Wielding Her Weapons"; 82nd Night: "Break-In"; 83rd Night: "Bond"; Editor's Notes
18	May 2, 2013	978-4-592-19138-4	May 6, 2014	978-1-4215-6433-3
84th Night: "The King of Hubris, The Queen of Vanity"; 85th Night: "I Will Succeed You"; 86th Night: "Pursuer"; 87th Night: "Masquerade Night"; 88th Night: "A Seventeen Year Old's Resolution"; Editor's Notes
19	November 5, 2013	978-4-592-19139-1	October 14, 2014	978-1-4215-7391-5
89th Night: "A Night to End a Thousand Nights"; 90th Night: "Falling With You"; 91st Night: "The Birds Who Have Forgotten the Song of Happiness"; 92nd Night: "Proof of Knighthood"; The Last Night-93rd Night: "Vampire Knight"; Editor's Notes

== Vampire Knight: Memories ==
No.	Original release date	Original ISBN	English release date	English ISBN
1	June 3, 2016	978-4-592-21121-1	August 1, 2017	978-1-4215-9430-9
"Life"; "I Love You"; "Love's Desire"; "Between Death and Heaven"; Editor's Notes
2	June 5, 2017	978-4-592-21122-8	August 7, 2018	978-1-9747-0024-0
3	May 2, 2018	978-4-592-21123-5	July 2, 2019	978-1-9747-0515-3
4	February 5, 2019	978-4-592-21124-2	March 3, 2020	978-1-9747-1076-8
5	November 5, 2019	978-4-592-21125-9	December 1, 2020	978-1-9747-1733-0
6	September 4, 2020	978-4-592-22046-6	June 1, 2021	978-1-9747-2305-8
7	August 5, 2021	978-4-592-22047-3	July 5, 2022	978-1-9747-3206-7
8	August 5, 2022	978-4-592-22048-0	July 4, 2023	978-1-9747-3883-0
9	October 5, 2023	978-4-592-22049-7	October 1, 2024	978-1-9747-4919-5
10	October 4, 2024	978-4-592-22221-7	October 7, 2025	978-1-9747-5875-3
11	December 5, 2025	978-4-592-22222-4	December 1, 2026	978-1-9747-6907-0

== See also ==
- List of Vampire Knight characters
- List of Vampire Knight episodes
