= List of Negima! Magister Negi Magi chapters =

The cover of Negima! Magister Negi Magi volume 1 as released by Kodansha on July 17, 2003, in Japan.

The chapters of Negima! Magister Negi Magi are written and illustrated by Ken Akamatsu, the same person who wrote and illustrated series, such as A.I. Love You and Love Hina. The series is being serialized in Japan in Weekly Shōnen Magazine and is being collected into bound novels by Kodansha. It has been licensed for an English-language release in the United States and Canada by Del Rey Manga, and in the United Kingdom by Tanoshimi.

The series was adapted into a 26-episode-long anime television series by the Japanese animation studio Xebec and originally aired on TV Tokyo. It has been licensed for an English release in the United States by Funimation Entertainment, and has aired on the Funimation Channel. In addition, four original video animations (OVAs) have been made, as well as a TV drama series.

== Chapter list ==
No.	Original release date	Original ISBN	English release date	English ISBN
01	July 17, 2003	978-4-06-363268-2	April 27, 2004 (NA); August 3, 2006 (UK)	978-0-345-47046-1 (NA); 0-09-950415-4 (UK)
001. "The Kid Instructor Is a Magician!" (お子ちゃま先生は魔法使い!, "Oko-chama Sensei wa Mahōtsukai!"); 002. "Panic in the Library?!" (ドッキリ図書室危機一髪!?, "Dokkiri Toshoshitsu Kikiippatsu!?"); 003. "Bathhouse Rub ♥" (おフロでキュキュキュ ♥, "Ofuro de Kyukyukyu ♥"); 004. "The Dreaded Afterschool Session!" (キョーフの居残り授業!, "Kyōfu no Inokori Jugyō!"); 005. "Super Dodge Ball Competition!! Go Girls! (Part One)" (ドッジボール大勝負!!~闘え乙女たち~(前編), "Dojjibōru ō Shōbu!! ~Tatakae Otome-tachi~ (Zenpen)"); 006. "Super Dodge Ball Competition!! Go Girls! (Part Two)" (ドッジボール大勝負!!~闘え乙女たち~(後編), "Dojjibōru ō Shōbu!! ~Tatakae Otome-tachi~ (Kōhen)"); Letter from the Editor; About the Creator; Character Sketches; Translation Notes; Preview of Negima! Volume 2
02	August 12, 2003	978-4-06-363276-7	August 3, 2004 (NA); August 3, 2006 (UK)	978-0-345-47120-8 (NA); 0-09-950416-2 (UK)
007. "The Baka Rangers and the Secret Library Island. The Big Game Plan for the Final Test, Part 1" (バカレンジャーと秘密の図書館島~期末テスト大作戦その①, "Baka Renjā to Himitsu no Toshokan-jima ~ Kimatsu Tesuto Daisakusen Sono Ichi"); 008. "The Baka Rangers and the Secret Library Island. The Big Game Plan for the Final Test, Part 2" (バカレンジャーと秘密の図書館島~期末テスト大作戦その②, "Baka Renjā to Himitsu no Toshokan-jima ~ Kimatsu Tesuto Daisakusen Sono Ni"); 009. "The Baka Rangers and the Secret Library Island. The Big Game Plan for the Final Test, Part 3" (バカレンジャーと秘密の図書館島~期末テスト大作戦その③, "Baka Renjā to Himitsu no Toshokan-jima ~ Kimatsu Tesuto Daisakusen Sono San"); 010. "The Baka Rangers and the Secret Library Island. The Big Game Plan for the Final Test, Part 4" (バカレンジャーと秘密の図書館島~期末テスト大作戦その④, "Baka Renjā to Himitsu no Toshokan-jima ~ Kimatsu Tesuto Daisakusen Sono Yon"); 011. "The Baka Rangers and the Secret Library Island. The Big Game Plan for the Final Test, Part 5" (バカレンジャーと秘密の図書館島~期末テスト大作戦その⑤, "Baka Renjā to Himitsu no Toshokan-jima ~ Kimatsu Tesuto Daisakusen Sono Go"); 012. "Egirl Life" (eGirl Life☆); 013. "Recommended! The Child Strolling Brigade" (ススメ!お子ちゃま散歩隊, "Susume! Oko-chama Sanpotai"); 014. "Yesterday's Enemy is Tomorrow's Nemesis" (きのうの敵はきょうの強敵!, "Kinō no Teki wa Kyō no Tomo!"); 015. "Negi-Sensei's Wedding?!" (ネギ先生、ご結婚!?, "Negi-sensei, Gokekkon!?"); About the Creator; Character Sketches; Latium Lexicon Negimarium; Class Roster; Translation Notes; Preview of Negima! Volume 3
03	November 17, 2003	978-4-06-363311-5	October 12, 2004 (NA); August 3, 2006 (UK)	978-0-345-47180-2 (NA); 0-09-950417-0 (UK)
016. "The Wizard of Cherry Blossom Street" (桜通りの魔法使い, "Sakura-dōri no Mahōtsukai"); 017. "Her Name is Evangeline" (その名はエヴァンジェリン, "Sono Na wa Evanjierin"); 018. "A Visit from a Small Helper, Perhaps!?" (小さな助っ人、参上カモ!?, "Chiisana Suketto, Sanjō kamo!?"); 019. "A Man's Pledge (Maybe)" (漢の誓い(‥らしい‥‥), "Otoko no Chikai (..Rashii....)"); 020. "What!? A Contract With Asuna!?" (え!?アスナと契約っ!?, "E!? Asuna to Pakutiō!?"); 021. "An Apprenticeship" (修業でござるよ♪, "Shugyō de Gozaru yo ♪"); 022. "Negi In Ecstasy!!!" (ネギ、無我夢中!!, "Negi, Mugamuchū!!"); 023-025. "The Big Game Plan for the Huge Blackout of Academy City" (学園都市大停電大作戦!!, "Gakuentoshi Daiteiden Daisakusen!!"); About the Creator; Lexicon Negimarium de Cantu; Character Sketches; Translation Notes; Preview of Volume 4
04	January 16, 2004	978-4-06-363330-6	December 28, 2004 (NA); October 7, 2006 (UK)	978-0-345-47784-2 (NA); 0-09-950500-2 (UK)
026. "Proof of a Contract!?" (契約の証!?, "Keiyaku no akashi!?"); 027. "A Secret Date!? Cheerleaders Attack!" (秘密のデート!?応援少女隊、出撃!, "Himitsu no Dēto!? Chiarīdāzu, Shutsugeki!"); 028. "Ribbit Ribbit — Panic on the Bullet Train!?" (新幹線でケロケロパニック!?, "Shinkansen de Kerokero Panikku!?"); 029. "The Spy and the Thorough Thumping!?" (スパイとスッポンポン!?, "Supai to Supponpon!?"); 030. "Konoka and Setsuna's Secret" (このかと刹那の秘密の事情, "Konoka to Setsuna no Himitsu no Jijō"); 031-032. "Weird! Kyoto and the Cardmaster!!" (怪奇!京都·お札三昧女!!, "Kaiki! Kyōto Ofuda Zanmai Onna!!"); 033. "A Favor of the Large Buddha!? (In Nara)" (大仏に願いを!? in 奈良, "Daibutsu ni Negai o!? In Nara"); 034. "Shocking Kyoto Video Proves Existence of a Wizard!?" (京都発·衝撃映像!!魔法使いは実在した!?, "Kyōto Hatsu, Shōgeki Eizō!! Mahōtsukai wa Jitsuzai Shita!?"); Fan Art; Character Sketches; Lexicon Negimarium de Cantu; Class Roster; About the Creator; Translation Notes; Preview of Volume 5
05	April 16, 2004	978-4-06-363362-7	March 29, 2005 (NA); September 7, 2006 (UK)	978-0-345-47785-9 (NA); 0-09-950502-9 (UK)
035. "Love's ♥ Gonna Getcha in the Middle of the Night!!" (真夜中に♥ゲッチュウ!!, "Mayonaka ni Rabu Getchū!!"); 036. "The Labyrinth of Lips" (くちびる·ラビリンス, "Kuchibiru Rabirinsu"); 037. "Who Does Negi's Kiss Belong to!?" (ネギのキッスは誰のモノ?, "Negi no Kissu wa Dare no Mono?"); 038. "Nodoka and the Secret Picture Diary" (のどかと秘密の絵日記!?, "Nodoka to Himitsu no Enikki!?"); 039. "The Dazzling Whirling Loop Survival" (めくるめく·グルグルループ·サバイバル, "Mekurumeku Guruguru Rūpu Sabaibaru"); 040. "In Order to Get off the Road We're Lost on" (迷い道を抜けるため‥‥, "Mayoi Michi o Nukeru Tame...."); 041. "A Secret Plan from Me!?" (我に秘策アリ!?, "Ware ni Hisaku Ari!?"); 042-043. "The Bodyguard is a Member of the Shinsen Group" (用心棒は新撰組!?, "Yōjinbō wa Shinsengumi!?"); Character Popularity Poll; Character Sketches; Negima! Dictionary of Various Terms of Black Magic; Partner Cards Explained; Botched Cards; Clothing Sketches; Letter Corner; Translation Notes; Preview of Negima Volume 6; About the Creator
06	June 17, 2004	978-4-06-363392-4	June 28, 2005 (NA); October 5, 2006 (UK)	978-0-345-47786-6 (NA); 0-09-950503-7 (UK)
044. "Welcome to the Head Temple! ♥" (総本山へおこしやす ♥, "Sōhonzan e Okoshiyasu ♥"); 045. "Silence at the Head Temple?" (総本山 沈黙!?, "Sōhonzan Chinmoku!?"); 046. "The Head Temple in Flames?!" (総本山、燃ゆ!?, "Sōhonzan, Moyu!?"); 047. "Take Konoka Back" (このかを取り戻せ!!!, "Konoka o Torimodose!!!"); 048. "Time for Action" (行動の時!!, "Kōdō no Toki!!"); 049. "The Hidden Power, Unleashed" (解放·秘められた力!, "Kaihō Himerareta Chikara!"); 050. "For Konoka's Sake" (このかのために‥‥, "Konoka no Tame ni...."); 051. "Return of Dark Evangeline" (再臨·闇の福音!, "Sairin Dāku Evanjieru!"); 052. "The Miracle Moment" (奇跡の瞬間, "Kiseki no Shunkan"); 053. "Memories of Kyoto" (思い出の京都, "Omoide no Kyōto"); Character Sketches; About the Creator; Translation Notes; Cover Sketches
07	September 17, 2004	978-4-06-363426-6	September 27, 2005 (NA); October 5, 2006 (UK)	978-0-345-47787-3 (NA); 0-09-950504-5 (UK)
054. "Le Map, L'Amour, Le Chocolat ♥" (地図とお熱とチョコレート ♥, "Chizu to Onetsu to Chokorēto ♥"); 055. "Three-Way Action ♥" (恋のトライアングル·マッチ!, "Koi no Toraianguru Matchi!"); 056. "Negi, Makie, and the Disciple Test" (ネギとまき絵と弟子入りテスト, "Negi to Makie to Deshiiri Tesuto"); 057-058. "Bring It Home" (とどけ、一撃!, "Todoke, Ichigeki!"); 059. "Buying You a Clue" (テガカリをキミに‥‥, "Tegakari o Kimi ni...."); 060. "Cards, How to Use" (正しいカードの使い方?, "Tadashii Kādo no Tsukaikata?"); 061. "Marshmallow Empire of the South Pacific" (南国マシュマロ帝国, "Nangoku Mashumaro Teikoku"); 062. "Lubba-Dub! Not Here, Please" (ドキッ!南の島で、うちあけないで‥‥, "Doki! Minami no Shima de, Uchiakenaide...."); Character Sketches; Cover Sketches; About the Creator; Translation Notes; Preview of Negima! Vol. 8
08	November 17, 2004	978-4-06-363451-8	December 27, 2005 (NA); December 7, 2006 (UK)	978-0-345-46540-5 (NA); 0-09-950505-3 (UK)
063. "(Secret) Tower for Two ♥" (二人っきりの秘密の塔 ♥, "Futarikkiri no Himitsu no Tō ♥"); 064. "After That Magic-Teacher!" (魔法先生を追いかけろ!!, "Mahō Sensei o Oikakero!!"); 065. "My Very Own Superhero" (僕だけのスーパーマン!, "Boku Dake no Sūpāman!"); 066. "The Truth of That Snowy Day" (雪の日の真実, "Yuki no Hi no Shinjitsu"); 067. "Rub-a-Dub-Dub, There's Slime in the Tub" (ドッキリぬるぬるバスタイム, "Dokkiri Nurunuru Basu Taimu"); 068. "It Was a Dark and Stormy Visitor" (嵐の夜の訪問者, "Arashi no Yoru no Hōmonsha"); 069. "The Attack Begins! Negi and Kotarō" (出撃!ネギと小太郎!!, "Shutsugeki! Negi to Kotarō!!"); 070. "A Reason to Fight" (戦う理由, "Tatakau Riyū"); 071. "Negi's Choice" (ネギの選択, "Negi no Sentaku"); Fan Art; Evangeline's Resort; About the CG Backgrounds; Class Roster; Cover Sketches; About the Creator; Translation Notes; Preview of Negima! Vol. 9
09	February 17, 2005	978-4-06-363484-6	February 28, 2006 (NA); December 7, 2006 (UK)	978-0-345-48273-0 (NA); 0-09-950506-1 (UK)
072. "The Merry Month of Maids" (もえろ 乙女たち!, "Moero Otome-tachi!"); 073. "Soft on the Outside, Clever on the Inside" (外はフンワリ 中はシッカリ!, "Soto wa Funwari Naka wa Shikkari!"); 074. "Here, There, and Nowhere" (実は ずっといました‥‥, "Jitsu wa Zutto Imashita...."); 075. "The Logic of Illogic" (濡れた瞳の論理, "Nureta Hitomi no Rojikku"); 076-77. "Strange But True! Love's Practice Run" (恋のキテレツ予行演習, "Koi no Kiteretsu Yokō Enshū"); 078. "Draw Curtain: The Negi Grab-'n'-Run" (開幕、ネギ争奪戦!, "Kaimaku, Negi Sōdatsusen!"); 079. "The Sweet Truth of the World-Tree Legend ♥" (世界樹伝説のあま~い真実 ♥, "Sekaiju Densetsu no Amāi Shinjitsu ♥"); 080. "Signs & Portents at the Pre-Festival Gala" (胸騒ぎの前夜祭, "Munasawagi no Zen'yasai"); Lexicon Negimarium; Popularity Poll; Fan Art; Character Sketches; 3-D Backgrounds; Class Roster; Cover Sketches; About the Creator; Translation Notes; Preview of Negima! Vol. 10
10	May 17, 2005	978-4-06-363529-4	May 30, 2006 (NA); January 4, 2007 (UK)	978-0-345-48441-3 (NA); 0-09-950507-X (UK)
081. "MahoraFest Begins" (麻帆良祭、大開幕!, "Mahora-sai, Daikaimaku!"); 082. "MahoraFest Begins... Again?!" (麻帆良祭、再スタート!?, "Mahora-sai, Sai Sutāto!?"); 083. "Date With a Bookstore ♥" (本屋DEデート ♥, "Hon'ya De Dēto ♥"); 084. "'Kiss Machine' Negi?!" (キスマシーン·ネギ!?, "Kisu Mashīn Negi!?"); 085. "So What is a Grown-Up Kiss Like??" (オトナの味ってどんな味?, "Otona no Ajitte Donna Aji?"); 086. "The Object of One's Long-Ago Love" (記憶の中の恋の照準, "Kioku no Naka no Koi no Shōjun"); 087. "That Lovin' Feeling That Just Won't Hide" (隠しきれない恋心, "Kakushikirenai Koigokoro"); 088. "Return of the Ver-r-ry Dangerous ♥ Martial-Arts Tournament" (復活!伝説の ♥ あぶな~い格闘大会, "Fukkatsu! Densetsu no Abunāi Kakutō Taikai"); 089. "The "Ba-Bump! Nuthin'-But-the-Strongest" ♥ Battle Royal" (強者だらけのドキドキ ♥ バトルロイヤル, "Tsuwamono Darake no Dokidoki Batoru Roiyaru"); Fan Art; Mahora Academy Concept Sketches; Pactio Card Art; CG Backgrounds; Cover Sketches; About the Creator; Translation Notes; Preview of Negima! Vol. 11
11	August 17, 2005	978-4-06-363565-2	August 29, 2006 (NA); January 4, 2007 (UK)	978-0-345-49231-9 (NA); 0-09-950625-4 (UK)
090. "In Which All (?) is Set A'Right: Entering Events" (帳尻合わせ?の中夜祭, "Chōjiri Awase? no Chūya-sai"); 091. "Wise in the Ways of Cosplay ♥" (コスプレの極意、教えマス ♥, "Kosupure no Gokui, Oshiemasu ♥"); 092. "Promise to a Rival" (宿敵との誓い, "Tomo to no Chikai"); 093. "Enter Kotarō! The Budōkai Begins" (小太郎、出陣! いざ、開幕の武道会!!, "Kotarō, Shutsujin! Iza, Kaimaku no Budōkai!!"); 094. "Extreme Combat! Tatsumiya vs. Kū Fei" (激戦! 龍宮VS古菲!!, "Gekisen! Tatsumiya VS Kū Fei!!"); 095. "The Latest Weapon... and a Tradition of Fighting Spirit" (闘魂伝承と新型兵器, "Tōkon Denshō to Shingata Heiki"); 096. "Courage — the Key to Victory!" (勇気が勝機!, "Yūki ga Shōki!"); 097. "Takamichi Gets Really Real" (タカミチのホントの本気, "Takamichi no Honto no Honki"); 098. "Negi! Get Up!!" (立つんだ! ネギ!!, "Tatsunda! Negi!!"); 099. "The Hidden Technique Bursts Through" (秘策炸裂!!, "Hisaku Sakuretsu!!"); Festival Timetable; Fan Art Corner; CG Background Examination; Character Concept Sketches; Lexicon Magicum Negimarium; About the Creator; Translation Notes; Preview of Negima! Vol. 12
12	October 17, 2005	978-4-06-363587-4	November 28, 2006 (NA); January 4, 2007 (UK)	978-0-345-49463-4 (NA); 0-09-950635-1 (UK)
100. "Hidden Memory" (秘められた記憶, "Himerareta Kioku"); 101. "The Thing About Being All Brawn, No Brains" (体力バカのホントの力, "Tairyoku Baka no Honto no Chikara"); 102. "Asuna Overflowing?!" (明日菜·オーバーフロー!?, "Asuna Ōbāfurō!?"); 103. "The Ever-Deepening Mysteries of MahoraFest" (どっぷりと、謎が深まる麻帆良祭, "Doppuri to, Nazo ga Fukamaru Mahora-sai"); 104. "Promise with Negi" (ネギとの約束, "Negi to no Yakusoku"); 105. "The Scariest Thing in the World?! Chao's Plan (Part I)" (世にも恐怖な? 超の目的(前編), "Yo ni mo Kyōfu na? Chao no Mokuteki (Zenpen)"); 106. "The Scariest Thing in the World?! Chao's Plan (Part II)" (世にも恐怖な? 超の目的(後編), "Yo ni mo Kyōfu na? Chao no Mokuteki (Kōhen)"); 107. "Eva, the Queen of Mean" (いじめっコ大将、エヴァ, "Ijimekko Taishō, Eva"); 108. "The Ultimate Choice" (究極の選択, "Kyūkyoku no Sentaku"); 109. "The Tale of the Bad Mage" (悪い魔法使いの物語, "Warui Mahōtsukai no Monogatari"); 3-D Background Explanation Corner; Fan Art Corner; Character Concept Sketches; Lexicon Magicum Negimarium; About the Creator; Translation Notes; Preview of Negima! Vol. 13
13	January 17, 2006	978-4-06-363621-5	February 27, 2007 (NA); March 1, 2007 (UK)	978-0-345-49505-1 (NA); 0-09-950654-8 (UK)
110. "Ku:Nel Sanders, the One to Watch" (気になるアイツは、クウネル·サンダース, "Ki ni Naru Aitsu wa, Kūneru Sandāsu"); 111. "Kaede's Ninpo Knockout" (めくるめく楓忍法!!, "Mekurumeku Kaede Ninpō!!"); 112. "The Full Force of Kaede's Ninpo!!" (楓忍法、全開勝負!!, "Kaede Ninpō, Zenkai Shōbu!!"); 113. "That Which Waits in the Dark ♪" (まっ暗闇で待ってます♪, "Makkurayami de Mattemasu"); 114. "If You Are All Here, Then So Am I" (みんながいるからボクがいる, "Minna ga Iru Kara Boku ga Iru"); 115. "Love is power"; 116. "Advancing Finals, Advancing Conspiracy ♥" (すすめ決勝! すすむ陰謀 ♥, "Susume Kesshō! Susumu Inbō"); 117. "Reunion with Father?!" (父との再会!?, "Chichi to no Saikai!?"); 118. "Two Fists Full of Love" (すべての想いを両の拳に!, "Subete no Omoi o Ryō no Kobushi ni!"); 119. "Mixed-Up, Dragged-Out Finale" (フィナーレdeてんやわんや, "Fināre de Ten'yawan'ya"); Fan Art Corner; Character Concept Sketches; 3-D Background Explanation Corner; About the Creator; Translation Notes; Preview of Volume 14
14	April 17, 2006	978-4-06-363656-7	May 29, 2007 (NA); June 7, 2007 (UK)	978-0-345-49614-0 (NA); 0-09-950667-X (UK)
120. "Negi-kun Fan Club ♥" (ネギ君を応援する会 ♥, "Negi-kun o Ōen Suru Kai"); 121. "Negi Majorly Busted Magister Magi" (ネギ·マジばれテル マギステル·マギ, "Negi Maji Bareteru Magisuteru Magi"); 122. "Ordinary Yet Dreamy Love Story" (フツーでムチューな恋物語 ♥, "Futsū de Muchū na Koi Monogatari"); 123. "Pre-Performance Madness!!" (本番直前大騒動!!, "Honban Chokuzen Daisōdō!!"); 124. "Love Spells and Dreamy Results" (恋の魔法のステキな効力, "Koi no Mahō no Suteki na Kōryoku"); 125. "You're the Star!" (主役はキミだ!, "Shuyaku wa Kimi da!"); 126. "Fierce Magical Desires ♥" (モーレツ!物欲アタック ♥, "Mōretsu! Butsuyoku Atakku"); 127. "Danger! Love Triangle Ahead!" (トロトロ三角関係、危機一髪!!, "Torotoro Sankaku Kankei, Kikiippatsu!!"); 128. "The Front Line of Love and Friendship" (恋と友情の最前線, "Koi to Yūjō no Saizensen"); 129. "My Idol is a Superstar" (あこがれの人は有名人, "Akogare no Hito wa Sūpāsutā"); Character Designs; Fan Art Corner; 3-D Backgrounds Explanation Corner; Class Roster; Character Concept Sketches; About the Creator; Translation Notes
15	August 17, 2006	978-4-06-363692-5	August 28, 2007 (NA); September 6, 2007 (UK)	978-0-345-49615-7 (NA); 0-09-950679-3 (UK)
130. "An Anticipated Date Becomes an Unexpected Date" (ときめきデートはとんでもデート!, "Tokimeki Dēto wa Tondemo Dēto!"); 131. "Finale of the Older Man Complex!!" (オジコン·クライマックス!!, "Ojikon Kuraimakkusu!!"); 132. "Before Saying Goodbye" (サヨナラのその前に, "Sayonara no Sono Mae ni"); 133. "Super Battle Guidance Counseling!!" (スーパーバトル進路相談!!, "Sūpā Batoru Shinro Sōdan!!"); 134. "Full Throttle! Robotic Martial Arts!!" (全開! カラクリ拳法!!, "Zenkai! Karakuri Kenpō!!"); 135. "If Chao Lingshen Won't Cry, We'll Make Her Cry" (泣かぬなら、泣かせてみせよう、超 鈴音, "Nakanu Nara, Nakasete Miseyō, Chao Rinshen"); 136. "Team Negi-bozu ♥" (チーム·ネギ坊主 ♥, "Chīmu Negi-bōzu"); 137. "Mature Discussion of Combat ♥" (オトナ格闘相談室 ♥, "Otona Kakutō Sōdanshitsu"); 138. "An Unnusual Day for Negi's Party" (ネギ·パーティの異常な日常, "Negi Pāti no Ijō na Nichijō"); 139. "The Girl Genius Wins!" (天才少女の完全勝利, "Tensai Shōjo no Kanzen Shōri"); Fan Art Corner; Lexicon Negimarium; Class Roster; Character Concept Sketches; About the Creator; Translation Notes
16	October 17, 2006	978-4-06-363732-8	December 18, 2007 (NA); December 6, 2007 (UK)	978-0-345-49924-0 (NA); 0-09-950639-4 (UK)
140. "Top Secret Rescue Negi Operation!!" (ネギ救出㊙大作戦!!, "Negi Kyūshutsu Maruhi Daisakusen!!"); 141. "Critical Hit in the Naked Battle ♥" (裸の付き合いで快進撃 ♥, "Hadaka no Batoru de Kaishingeki"); 142. "Infiltrate! Charge! Negi Rescue Team!!" (潜入!突撃!ネギ救助隊!!, "Sen'nyū! Totsugeki! Negi Kyūjotai!!"); 143. "Terror! The Truth About Death Specs!!" (恐怖!デスメガネの真実!!, "Kyōfu! Desu-Megane no Shinjitsu!!"); 144. "Friendship! Victory! Reunion ♥" (友情!勝利!再会 ♥, "Yūjō! Shōri! Saikai"); 145. "The Clock's Ticking for the Time Machine" (タイムマシンのタイムリミット, "Taimu Mashin no Taimu Rimitto"); 146. "Top-Secret Operation: Defeat Chao!!" (打倒、超!㊙大作戦!!, "Datō, Chao! Maruhi Daisakusen!!"); 147. "The Complete Annihilation of Chao's Plan!!" (打倒·超計画の全貌!!, "Datō Chao Keikaku no Zenbō!!"); 148. "The Great Mahora Shootout ♥" (麻帆良大戦ドンパチ ♥, "Mahora Taisen Donpachi"); 149. "Welcome Negi Party ♥" (ウェルカムネギ·パーティ ♥, "Werukamu Negi Pāti"); Lexicon Negimarium; Fan Art Corner; 3-D Backgrounds Explanation Corner; Class Roster; Character Concept Sketches; About the Creator; Translation Notes
17	January 17, 2007	978-4-06-363774-8	March 4, 2008	978-0-345-50139-4
150. "The Great, Heated, Close Combat! Mahora Mage Order vs. Super Science from the Future!!!" (熱戦!接戦!大激戦!!麻帆良魔法軍団VS未来超科学!!!, "Nessen! Sessen! Daigekisen!! Mahora Mahō Gundan VS Mirai Chō Kagaku!!!"); 151. "Recharge Complete, the Return of Negi!!" (充電完了、ネギ復活!!, "Jūden Kanryō, Negi Fukkatsu!!"); 152. "I've Got My Sights Locked On You ♥" (キミだけを狙い撃ち ♥, "Kimi Dake o Nerai Uchi"); 153. "Go! Negi-bozu!!" (いけ!ネギ坊主!!, "Ike! Negi-bōzu!!"); 154. "Fight! Magical Girl Biblion!?" (戦え!魔法少女ビブリオン!?, "Tatakae! Mahō Shōjo Biburion!?"); 155. "Negi Cometh!!" (ネギ、見参!!, "Negi, Kenzan!!"); 156. "Everyone's Strength Will Save the World!" (みんなの力が世界を救う!, "Min'na no Chikara ga Sekai o Sukū!"); 157. "Where's Justice!?" (正義は何処に!?, "Seigi wa Izuko ni!?"); 158. "We All Carry the Burden of the Future!" (誰もが未来を背負ってる!, "Dare mo ga Mirai o Seotteru!"); 159. "Justice Sides with the Victor!!" (勝ち残ったものこそが正義!!, "Kachinokottamono Koso ga Seigi!!"); Lexicon Negimarium; Fan Art Corner; 3-D Backgrounds Explanation Corner; Cover Concept Sketches; Translation Notes; About the Creator; Preview of Volume 18
18	April 17, 2007	978-4-06-363801-1	June 3, 2008	978-0-345-50202-5
160. "May the World Be at Peace ♥" (世界が平和でありますように ♥, "Sekai ga Heiwa de Arimasu yō ni"); 161. "The Future Belongs to Everyone ♥" (未来はみんなのためのもの ♥, "Mirai wa Min'na no Tame no Mono"); 162. "Hope for a Happy Future, Zaijian!!" (幸福な未来に再見!!, "Kōfuku na Mirai ni Saichen!!"); 163. "Take a Break ♥" (Have a break ♥); 164. "Magical Michevious Spirit ♥ Part 1" (マジカル悪戯魂 ♥, "Majikaru Itazura Supiritto"); 165. "Magical Michevious Spirit ♥ Part 2" (マジカル悪戯魂 ♥ その②, "Majikaru Itazura Supiritto Sono Ni"); 166. "Silence Can Be a Kindness ♥" (沈黙ハ優しさナリ ♥, "Chinmoku wa Yasashisa Nari"); 167. "Negi's Growing Up ♥" (ネギ、育ってます ♥, "Negi, Sodattemasu"); 168. "Only a Few More Nights Until Summer Break ♪" (もーいくつ寝ると、夏休み♪, "Mō Ikutsu Neru to Natsuyasumi"); Fan Art Corner; 3-D Backgrounds Explanation Corner; Lexicon Negimarium; Class Roster; Cover Concept Sketches; Translation Notes; About the Creator; Preview of Volume 19
19	July 17, 2007	978-4-06-363850-9	September 9, 2008	978-0-345-50526-2
169. "Is it a Dream, a Reality, or an Illusion?" (夢か現か幻か!?, "Yume ka Utsutsu ka Maboroshi ka!?"); 170. "Out of Control Club Chairman Test ♥" (とんでも部長就任テスト ♥, "Tondemo Buchō Shūnin Tesuto"); 171. "Death Study ♥" (death study ♥); 172. "Death Study ♥ Part 2" (death study ♥ その②, "Death Study Sono Ni"); 173. "Endless Death Study ♥" (endless death study ♥); 174. "The Keyword is 'Father'" (キーワードはチチです!?, "Kīwādo ha Chichi Desu!?"); 175. "A Single Frame of a Youthful Summer" (それは夏の日の青春の1コマであった., "Sore wa Natsu no Hi no Seishun no Hitokoma de Atta."); 176. "Club Negima (Temporary Name) Growing in Numbers ♥" (ネギま部(仮)増殖中 ♥, "Negima-bu (Kari) Zōshokuchū"); 177. "Dead or Alive"; Fan Art Corner; 3-D Backgrounds Explanation Corner; Character Rough Sketches; Lexicon Negimarium; Class Roster; Cover Concept Sketches; Translation Notes; About the Creator
20	October 17, 2007	978-4-06-363898-1	December 16, 2008	978-0-345-50527-9
178. "Summer! Beach! Confession!?" (夏だ!海だ!告白だ!?, "Natsu da! Umi da! Kokuhaku da!?"); 179. "She's the One for Negi!?" (つまりあのコが大本命!?, "Tsumari Ano Ko ga Daihonmei!?"); 180. "Explosion! Negi Wars ♥" (勃発!ネギ·ウォーズ ♥, "Boppatsu ! Negi Wōzu"); 181. "I Need to Tell You Something!" (言っておきたいことがある!, "Itte Okitai Koto ga Aru!"); 182. "Negi Party, All Ready!" (ネギ·パーティ、準備万端!!, "Negi Pāti, Junbi Bantan!!"); 183. "Full of Memories ♥" (思い出がいっぱい ♥, "Omoide ga Ippai"); 184. "Negi Party Departs to London!!" (ネギ·パーティ、ロンドンに立つ!!, "Negi Pāti, Rondon ni Tatsu!!"); 185. "Starting Point for the Future!!" (未来の出発点, "Mirai no Sutāteingu Pointo"); 186. "Welcome to Another World!!" (Welcome to Anotherworld!!); Fan Art Corner; Itinerary for Britain; 3-D Backgrounds Explanation Corner; Cover Concept Sketches; Translation Notes; About the Creator; Preview of Negima! Volume 21
21	January 17, 2008	978-4-06-363938-4	March 24, 2009	978-0-345-50528-6
187. "Fate Causes a Catastrophe" (凶悪!フェイト·パーティ, "Kyōaku! Feito Pāti"); 188. "Power Up, Negi Party!" (強いぞ、ネギ·パーティ!!, "Tsuyoi zo, Negi Pāti!!"); 189. "Destruction! Negi Party!!" (壊滅!? ネギ·パーティ!!, "Kaimetsu!? Negi Pāti!!"); 190. "Energy Recovered, 120% ♥" (エネルギー充塡120% ♥, "Enerugī Jūten Hyaku-ni-jū Pāsento"); 191. "Promise from the Past" (あの日の約束, "Ano Hi no Yakusoku"); 192. "Hero's Duty" (ヒーローの条件, "Hīrō no Jōken"); 193. "Wanted!!" (まるごと賞金首!, "Marugoto Shōkin Kubi!"); 194. "Maid in the Magical World" (メイド·イン·魔法世界, "Meido in Mahō Sekai"); 195. "1,000,000 Dorakuma Repayment Plan" (100万ドラクマ返済計画, "Hyakuman Dorakuma Hensai Keikaku"); Fan Art Corner; Lexicon Negimarium; Class Roster; Cover Concept Sketches; Translation Notes; About the Creator; Preview of Negima! Volume 22
22	April 17, 2008	978-4-06-363971-1	May 19, 2009	978-0-345-51030-3
196. "Enter the New Heroes!!" (ニューヒーロー登場!!, "Nyū Hīrō Tōjō!!"); 197. "Project: One Stone, Three Birds ♥" (プロジェクト·一石三鳥 ♥, "Purojekuto Isseki Sanchō"); 198. "Life-Threatening Showdown!!" (命を賭けた決闘!!, "Inochi o Kaketa Kettō!!"); 199. "Ako's Heart-Pounding Examination Room ♥" (亜子のドキドキ診察室 ♥, "Ako no Dokidoki Shinsatsu Shitsu"); 200. "Respective Strengths!" (それぞれの「強さ」!, "Sorezore no Tsuyosa!"); 201. "A New Master / Disciple Combo is Born ♥" (新·師弟コンビ誕生 ♥, "Shin Shitei Konbi Tanjō"); 202. "All Negi's Got" (ネギ、今のすべて., "Negi, Ima no Subete."); 203. "Magical Girl Yue" (魔法少女·ユエ, "Mahō Shōjo Yue"); 204. "If I Could Be Stupid... ♥" (バカになれたら‥‥ ♥, "Baka ni Naretara...."); Magical World Map & Classmates; Fan Art Corner; 3-D Backgrounds Explanation Corner; Lexicon Negimarium; Cover Concept Sketches; About the Creator; Translation Notes
23	August 12, 2008	978-4-06-384021-6	July 7, 2009	978-0-345-51426-4
205. "Father's Path or Master's Path!?" (父の道か師の道か!?, "Chichi no Michi ka Shi no Michi ka!?"); 206. "Precious Reunion ♥" (サイカイ.サイアイ ♥, "Saikai Saiai"); 207. "No Chance of Winning!!?" (勝機ゼロ!!?, "Shōki Zero!!?"); 208. "Limit" (リミット, "Rimitto"); 209. "Negi's Back!" (帰ってきたネギ!, "Kaettekita Negi!"); 210. "Everyone's Energetically Devoted to Life ♥" (みんな元気に日々是精進 ♥, "Minna Genki ni Hibi Kore Shōjin"); 211. "Magical Girl Major Battle ♥" (魔女っコ、マジバトル ♥, "Majokko, Maji Batoru"); 212. "100km Broom Rally; Falling Clothes and Danger Ahead ♥" (百キロ箒ラリー、ポロリも危険もアリアリよ ♥, "Hyaku Kiro Hōki Rarī, Porori mo Kiken mo Ariari yo"); 213. "Super Magical Girl Yue ♥" (スーパー魔法少女·ユエ ♥, "Sūpā Mahō Shōjo Yue"); Fan Art Corner; 3-D Backgrounds Explanation Corner; Lexicon Negimarium; Bonus Pages; Cover Concept Sketches; About the Creator; Translation Notes; Preview of Negima! volume 24
24	November 17, 2008	978-4-06-384061-2	October 27, 2009	978-0-345-51427-1
214. "I'm So Glad to See You ♥" (あなたに会えてよかった ♥, "Anata ni Aete Yokatta"); 215. "Operation: Return to the Real World! Begin!!" (始動!現実世界帰還作戦!!, "Shidō! Genjitsu Sekai Kikan Sakusen!!"); 216. "Is Love an Illusion??" (愛は幻??, "Ai wa Maboroshi??"); 217. "Now Is the Time to Face the Darkness!" (闇と向き合う時は今!, "Yami to Mukiau Toki wa Ima!"); 218. "Boobies in Peril!!" (おっぱい危機一髪!!, "Oppai Kikiippatsu!!"); 219. "A Wonder to Behold! Magia Erebea!!" (驚異!闇の魔法!!, "Kyōi! Magia Erebea!!"); 220. "The Hearts of the Negima Club Are One!" (ネギま部の心はひとつ!, "Negima-bu no Kokoro wa Hitotsu!"); 221. "Let the Festivities Begin ♥" (オ祭リ、始マリ ♥, "Omatsuri, Hajimari"); 222. "Negi vs. Fate" (ネギvs.フェイト, "Negi vs. Feito"); Fan Art Corner; 3-D Backgrounds Explanation Corner; Lexicon Negimarium; Cover Concept Sketches; About the Creator; Translation Notes
25	February 17, 2009	978-4-06-384095-7	February 23, 2010	978-0-345-51882-8
223. "Negi Party vs Fate Party" (ネギ·パーティvs.フェイト·パーティ, "Negi Pāti vs. Feito pāti"); 224. "Incredible Strengths! Fate's Pretty Girl Army" (スゴ腕!フェイト美少女軍団, "Sugo ude! Feito Bishōjo Gundan"); 225. "Declaration of War!!" (宣戦布告!!, "Sensen Fukoku!!"); 226. "Wish Upon a Pair of Panties ♥" (パンツに願いを ♥, "Pantsu ni Negai o"); 227. "All Out War!! Negi Party vs Fate Party" (総力対決!! ネギ·パーティvs.フェイト·パーティ, "Sōryoku Taiketsu!! Negi Pāti vs. Feito Pāti"); 228. "Negi Party, Assembled!" (ネギ·パーティ集結!, "Negi Pāti Shūketsu!"); 229. "Fate's True Identity!" (フェイトの正体!, "Feito no Shōtai!"); 230. "Episode 1: 'Rakan Sets Out ♥'" (EP1「旅立ちのラカン ♥」, "EP1 'Tabidachi no Rakan'"); 231. "Episode 1: 'Rakan Sets Out ♥' Continued" (EP1「続·旅立ちのラカン ♥」, "EP1 'Zoku Tabidachi no Rakan'"); Lexicon Negimarium; Fan Art Corner; Cover Concept Sketches; About the Creator; Translation Notes
26	May 15, 2009	978-4-06-384135-0	May 25, 2010	978-0-345-52111-8
232. "Episode 1: 'Rakan's Journey ♥' - Continued Furthur" (EP1「続々·旅立ちのラカン ♥」, "EP1 'Zokuzoku Tabidachi no Rakan'"); 233. "Episode 1: 'Rakan's Journey! Forever ♥'" (EP1「旅立ちのラカンよ永遠に ♥」, "EP1 'Tabidachi no Rakan yo Eien ni'"); 234. "Captured Imperial Princess" (捕らわれの姫御子, "Toraware no Himemiko"); 235. "Advent of the Goddess of Breasts ♥" (チチガミ降臨 ♥, "Chichigami Kōrin"); 236. "Nagi/Kojiro Team, Head Out!" (ナギ·コジロー組、出陣!, "Nagi-Kojirō Kumi, Shutsujin!"); 237. "The Legend's Urgent Entry!!" (伝説緊急参戦!!, "Rejendo Kinkyū Sansen!!"); 238. "Declaration of Utter Defeat!?" (完敗宣言!?, "Kanpai Sengen!?"); 239. "Massing of Troops ♥ Courageous Allies" (集結 ♥ユウキのミカタ, "Shūketsu Yūki no Mikata"); 240. "All Ready! Crush Rakan" (万全! 打倒·ラカン, "Banzen! Datō Rakan"); Fan Art Corner; Lexicon Negimarium; 3-D Backgrounds Explanations Corner; Class Roster; Cover Concept Sketches; About the Creator; Translation Notes
27	September 17, 2009	978-4-06-384182-4	July 27, 2010	978-0-345-52159-0
241. "Negi Awakens!?" (ネギ、覚醒!!?, "Negi, Kakusei!!?"); 242. "Thunder God Negi!" (雷神·ネギ!, "Raijin Negi!"); 243. "Rakan, 120%!!" (ラカン、120%!!, "Rakan, Hyaku-ni-jū Pāsento!!"); 244. "Negi's Utter Defeat!?" (ネギ、完敗!?, "Negi, Kanpai!?"); 245. "I Still Believe in You, Negi!" (それでもやっぱり、ネギを信じてる!, "Soredemo Yappari, Negi o Shinjiteru!"); 246. "I'll Win, for You!" (勝利をあなたの為に!, "Shōri o Anata no Tame ni!"); 247. "Wild Dance of Trump Cards!" (切り札, 乱舞!!, "Kirifuda, Ranbu!!"); 248. "And to the Top." (そして頂へー., "Soshite, Itadaki ē."); 249. "Your Training Is Complete!" (免許皆伝!, "Menkyo Kaiden!"); Lexicon Negimarium; Fan Art Corner; Class Roster; Cover Concept Sketches; About the Creator; Translation Notes; Preview of Negima! Volume 28
28	November 17, 2009	978-4-06-384205-0	October 26, 2010	978-0-345-52160-6
250. "Again, to Mahora Academy!!" (再び, 麻帆良学園へ!!, "Futatabi, Mahora Gakuen e!!"); 251. "Reunion with Destiny" (運命との再開, "Unmei to no Saikai"); 252. "My Partner ♥" (ウチの剣士様 ♥, "Uchi no Pātonā"); 253. "The Hesitant Maidens' Pactio Dreams ♥" (悩める乙女のパクチュ〜夢 ♥, "Nayameru Otome no Pakuchū Mu"); 254. "The Other Mastermind!" (もう1人の黒幕!?, "Mō Hitori no Kurumaku!?"); 255. "Which Path Will Negi Choose?!" (どれがネギの選ぶ道!?, "Dore ga Negi no Erabu Michi!?"); 256. "Invitation from the Darkness" (闇からの招待状, "Yami kara no shōtaijō); 257. "The Plan to Return to the Real World Begins!" (現実世界帰還作戦、本格始動!!, "Genjitsu Sekai Kikan Sakusen, Honkaku Shidō!!"); 258. "To the Core of the World's Secrets!" (世界のヒミツの核心へ!!, "Sekai no Himitsu no Kakushin e!!")
29	February 17, 2010	978-4-06-384245-6	May 17, 2011	978-1-935-42956-2
259. "Outburst!? The Top Elites of the Magical World do Battle!" (勃発!? 魔法世界頂上バトル!!, "Boppatsu!? Mahō Sekai Chōjō Batoru!!"); 260. "Top Battle & Top Class Dance ♥" (頂上バトル&超上流ダンス ♥, "Chōjō Batoru & Chōjōryū Dansu"); 261. "Smooch Smooch Carnival ♥" (チュ～チュ～カーニバル ♥, "Chū Chū Kānibaru"); 262. "Smooch Smooch Carnival ♥ Episode 2" (チュ～チュ～カーニバル ♥ episode2, "Chū Chū Kānibaru episode2"); 263. "Smooch Smooch Carnival ♥ Episode 3" (チュ～チュ～カーニバル ♥ episode3, "Chū Chū Kānibaru episode3"); 264. "The Door of Truth!!" (真実の扉!!, "Shinjitsu no Tobira!!"); 265. "Encroachment of Darkness!" (闇の侵食!, "Yami no Shinsoku!"); 266. "Facing the Truth!" (真実との対面!, "Shinjitsu to no Taimen!"); 267. "Tale of a Father and a Mother's Fate" (父と母, その宿命の物語, "Chichi to Haha, Sono Sadame no Monogatari")
30	May 17, 2010	978-4-06-384293-7	July 19, 2011	978-1-935-42957-9
268. "Collapse of Love and the World" (恋と世界の崩落, "Koi to Sekai no Hōraku"); 269. "Until the End of the World...." (世界の果てまで・・・。, "Sekai no Hate Made...."); 270. "Your Answer, Please!" (答えを!, "Kotae o!"); 271. "Dilemma! The Legendary Mercenary Swordsman" (窮地!伝説の傭兵剣士, "Kyūchi! Densetsu no Yōhei Kenshi"); 272. "FINAL ANSWER"; 273. "I Believe in My Father and Friends!!" (父と仲間を信じてる!!, "Chichi to Nakama o Shinjiteru!!"); 274. "Negi Party's Great Escape!!" (ネギ・パーティ,大脱出!!, "Negi Pāti, Daidasshutsu!!"); 275. "'Cosmo Entelecheia' Revived" (復活の｢完全なる世界｣, "Fukkatsu no 'Kozumo Enterekeia'"); 276. "Friends, the Greatest Asset!" (仲間こそ最大の戦力!, "Nakama Koso Saidai no Senryoku!")
31	August 17, 2010	978-4-06-384343-9	September 20, 2011	978-1-935-42958-6
277. "The Magical World is Annihilated!!?" (魔法世界、消滅!!?, "Mahō Sekai, Shōmetsu!!?"); 278. "Conclusion! Showdown Between the Magical World's Top Elites" (決着! 魔法世界頂上対決, "Ketchaku! Mahō Sekai Chōjō Taiketsu"); 279. "Negi's Party is the Only Hope!!" (唯一の希望はネギ・パーティ!!, "Yuiitsu no Kibō wa Negi Pāti!!"); 280. "The Girls' Counterattack!!" (反撃の乙女達!!, "Hangeki no Otome-tachi!!"); 281. "Negi's Party, Hard a Port! Full Speed Ahead!!" (ネギ・パーティ、取舵一杯! 全速前進!!, "Negi Pāti, Torikaji Ippai! Zensoku Zenshin!!"); 282. "Seek the Key to Victory!!" (勝利の鍵を求めて!!, "Shōri no Kagi o Motomete!!"); 283. "Violent Attack on Asuna ♥" (明日菜にモーレツアタック♥, "Asuna ni Mōretsu Atakku"); 284. "The Captive Imperial Princess" (捕らわれの姫御子, "Toraware no Himemiko"); 285. "Dark Prescription" (闇の処方箋, "Yami no Shohōsen")
32	November 17, 2010	978-4-06-384343-9	November 22, 2011	978-1-935-42959-3
286. "Magia Erebea vs Negi's Party" (マギア・エレベアvs.ネギ・パーティ, "Magia Erebea vs. Negi Pāti"); 287. "Mahora Academy, All Hands to Battle Stations!!" (麻帆良学園, 総員戦闘配置!!, "Mahora Gakuen, Sōuin Sentō Haichi!!"); 288. "Secret Confession ♥" (ヒミツの告白♥, "Himitsu no kokuhaku ♥"); 289. "A String of Pactios is in the Forecast ♥" (決意の連パクチュウ意報発令中♥, "Ketsui no Ren Pakuchū-ihō Hatsureichū ♥"); 290. "Fate's Resolve" (フェイトの決意, "Feito no Ketsui"); 291. "Grasp the Darkness with Your Hands!" (闇をその手に!!, "Yami o Sono Te ni!!"); 292. "Last Project" (最終目標攻略計画, "Rasuto Purojekuto"); 293. "Outbreak! Last Battle!!" (開戦! ラストバトル!!, "Kaisen! Rasuto Batoru!!"); 294. "Charge, Ala Alba!!" (突撃せよ, 白い翼!!, "Totsugeki Seyo, Ara Aruba!!")
33	February 17, 2011	978-4-06-384439-9	January 31, 2012	978-1-612-62115-9
295. "Final Choice!!" (最後の選択!!, "Saigo no Sentaku!!"); 296. "Nostalgic Days" (懐かしき日々, "Natsukashiki Hibi"); 297. "Cosmo Entelecheia" (完全なる世界, "Kozumo Enterekeia"); 298. "There is Not Just One Future!" (未来は一つにあらず!, "Mirai wa Hitotsu ni Arazu!"); 299. "Negi's Solution VS. Fate's Solution" (ネギの答えVS.フェイトの答え, "Negi no Kotae VS. Feito no Kotae"); 300. "To Asuna's Side!!" (明日菜のもとへ!!, "Asuna no Moto e!!"); 301. "Towards the Battle to Save the World!!" (世界を救う戦いへ!!, "Sekai o Sukū Tatakai e!!"); 302. "Full Showdown! Cosmo Entelecheia vs. Ala Alba!!" (全面対決! 完全なる世界vs.白き翼!!, "Zenmen Taiketsu! Kozumo Enterekeia vs. Ara Aruba!!"); 303. "Last Dungeon, Front Line!" (墓守り人の宮殿, 最前線!!, "Rasuto Danjon, Saizensen!"); 304. "Full Showdown, Round 2!!" (全面対決, ラウンド2!!, "Zenmen Taiketsu, Raundo 2!!")
34	May 17, 2011	978-4-06-384487-0	April 24, 2012	978-1-612-62116-6
305. "Towards Fate!" (フェイトへ!, "Feito e!"); 306. "Prevail? Or Be Consumed!?" (倒すか? 飲まれるか!?, "Taosu ka? Nomareru ka!?"); 307. "Even So, We Still Believe in Negi!" (それでもネギを信じてる!, "Soredemo Negi o Shinjiteru!"); 308. "The Best Way to Infiltrate an Impenetrable Stronghold!!" (難攻不落への最善策!!, "Nankōfuraku e no Saizen saku!!"); 309. "Last Dungeon, Fearless Infiltration!!" (ラストダンジョン, 大胆不敵の大潜入!!, "Rasuto Danjon, Daitanfuteki no Daisen'nyū!!"); 310. "Ala Alba, Charge!!" (突撃, 白い翼!!, "Totsugeki, Ara Aruba!!"); 311. "Fate Retaliates" (逆襲のフェイト, "Gyakushū no Feito"); 312. "Desperate Ninja Art in an Absolute Predicament" (絶対窮地の捨て身忍法, "Zettai Kyūchi no Sutemi Ninpō"); 313. "Don't Give up Until the End!" (あきらめない, 最後まで!, "Akiramenai, Saigo Made!"); 314. "Rebirth"
35	August 17, 2011	978-4-06-384532-7	July 10, 2012	978-1-612-62120-3
315. "Toward the Fated Battle!" (宿命の戦いに向けて!, "Shukumei no Tatakai ni Mukete!"); 316. "Where is the "Truth"!?" (「真実」は何処に!?, "'Shinjitsu' wa Doko ni!?"); 317. "Countdown to Collapse!" (崩壊へのカウントダウン!, "Hōkai e no Kauntodaun!"); 318. "Final Battle!!" (決戦!!, "Kessen!!"); 319. "1000% Battle!!" (1000%バトル!!, "Sen Pāsento Batoru!!"); 320. "We Won't Lose, We Can't Lose!!" (負けない, 負けられない!!, "Makenai, Makerarenai!!"); 321. "Everyone's All-Out Battle!!" (みんなの全力バトル!!, "Minna no Zenryoku Batoru!!"); 322. "Magical World vs. Mahora Academy!!" (魔法世界vs.麻帆良学園!!, "Mahō Sekai vs. Mahora Gakuen!!"); 323. "Paru-sama is Back!" (帰ってきた! パル様号, "Kaettekita! Paru-sama-gō"); 324. "Top Secret Revealed!!" (明かされた秘密!!, "Akasareta Toppu Shīkuretto!!")
36	November 17, 2011	978-4-06-384577-8	October 30, 2012	978-1-612-62239-2
325. "It Ends Now!!" (決着は今!!, "Ketchaku wa Ima!!"); 326. "Fate Awakens" (目覚めのフェイト, "Mezame no Feito"); 327. "The Flavor of Coffee" (コーヒーの味わい, "Cōfī no Ajiwai"); 328. "Which One Survived!!?" (生き残ったのはどっちだ!!?, "Ikinokotta no wa Dotchi da!!?"); 329. "Entrusted Future!" (託される未来!, "Takusareru Mirai!"); 330. "The Nightmare Comes Back!!" (悪夢の復活!!, "Akumu no Fukkatsu!!"); 331. "Mahora Academy vs. Cosmo Entelecheia!!" (麻帆良学園vs.完全なる世界!!, "Mahora Gakuen vs. Kozumo Enterekeia!!"); 332. "The Classmates' Great Gathering!!!" (クラスメイト大集結!!!", "Kurasumeito Daishūketsu!!!"); 333. "Rescue Asuna! The Strongest Lineup, a Furious Counterattack!!" (明日菜を救え! 最強布陣, 猛反撃!!, "Asuna o Sukue! Saikyō Fujin, Mō Hangeki!!"); 334. "Reunion ♥ The Greatest Partner!!" (再会 ♥ 最高のパートナー!!, "Saikai ♥ Saikō no Pātonā!!"); 335. "Let All Living Things Resurrect!" (生きとし生ける者よ, 蘇れ!, "Ikitoshi Ikeru Mono yo, Yomigaere!")
37	February 17, 2012	978-4-06-384626-3	January 29, 2013	978-1-612-62271-2
336. "After a Great Battle!" (大戦一過!, "Taisen Ikka!"); 337. "I want to help !" (力になりたい!, "Chikara ni Naritai!"); 338. "A Beloved Space Development Project ♥" (恋する宇宙開発計画 ♡, "Koisuru Uchū Hatsu Keikaku ♥); 339. "Love Love Complex ♡" (ラブラブ・コンプレックス ♥, "Rabu Rabu Konpurekkusu ♥"); 340. "The Crystallization of Love is Born ♥" (愛の結晶、うまれました ♡, "Ai no Kesshō, Umaremashita ♥"); 341. "I'm Getting Married!?" (私, 嫁ぎます!?, "Watashi, Totsugimasu!?"); 342. "The True Nature of the Price!" (代償の正体!, "Daishō no Shōtai!"); 343. "The Eternal Farewell" (永遠の別れ, "Eien no Wakare"); 344. "The Enemy of Womankind, Negi!" (女の敵・ネギ!, "Onna no Teki, Negi!"); 345. "The Target is Negi-Sensei!" (ターゲットはネギ先生!, "Taagetto wa Negi-Sensei!")
38	May 17, 2012	978-4-06-384670-6	April 16, 2013	978-1-612-62243-9
346. "Revelation? Negi's Great Desire!!?" (発覚? ネギの大本命!!?, "Hakkaku? Negi no Daihonmei!!?"); 347. "Can't Stop the Love!!" (大好きが止まらない!!, "Daisuki ga Tomaranai!!"); 348. "Going All Out to Make You Confess ♡" (全力で吐かせます ♡, "Zenryoku de Hakasemasu ♡"); 349. "I want to protect Negi ♡" (ネギを守りたいっ♡, "Negi o Mamoritai ♡"); 350. "Onto the Endless Road" (果てのない旅路へ, "Hate no Nai Tabiji he"); 351. "Bye-Bye, Everyone!" (みんな、バイバイ!, "Minna, Bai Bai!"); 352. "A Century of Memories" (百年の記憶, "Hyakunen no Kioku"); 353. "To The Future" (進め未来へ, "Susume Mirai he"); 354. "The Wonder! Magical Detective Yue ♡" (怪傑！魔法探偵・夕映 ♡, "Kaiketsu! Mahōtantei Yue ♡"); 355. "3-A Forever" (3－Aよ永遠に, "3-A yo Eien ni")

== See also ==
- List of Negima! Magister Negi Magi characters
- List of Negima! Magister Negi Magi episodes
