= List of Negima episodes =

This is a list of episodes in the Negima! anime series, its remake, Negima!?, and the live-action adaptation Negima!!.

== Negima! episodes ==
No.	Title	Directed by (Note: Information is taken from the ending credits of each episode.)	Written by	Storyboarded by	Original release date
1	"Asinus in cathedra" Transliteration: "The Blockhead in the Professor's Chair"	Tamaki Nakatsu	Ichirō Ōkouchi	Nagisa Miyazaki	5 January 2005
Class 2-A meets its new homeroom teacher, who turns out to be a 10-year-old boy from Wales.
2	"Omne initium est difficile" Transliteration: "Every Beginning is Difficult"	Keiichi Ishikura	Ichirō Ōkouchi	Yoshiaki Iwasaki	12 January 2005
While the rest of 2-A welcome Negi to their class, Asuna and Negi try to put up with one another now that she knows that Negi is a mage in training.
3	"Amantes, amentes" Transliteration: "Lovers, Lunatics"	Tetsuya Endou	Ichirō Ōkouchi	Tetsuya Endou	19 January 2005
Realizing how little Asuna gets in respect, Negi creates a love potion that goes horribly wrong, while Nodoka begins to develop feeling for her new teacher. When Nodoka is about to kiss Negi, Asuna barges in by kicking a locked door with brute force. In the preview for the next episode Negi ironically comments that Asuna is "not too polished at geography" before telling her Wales is in England.
4	"Nullus est instar dimus" Transliteration: "No Place is Like Home"	Toshiaki Kanbara	Ichirō Ōkouchi	Yasuo Iwamoto	26 January 2005
Negi continues to attempt (and fails) to help Asuna get higher grades, first by tutoring her as part of a study group, then attempting to "improve her physique" during a stand-off in the bath.
5	"Fama volat" Transliteration: "Rumor Flies"	Takashi Yamamoto	Ichirō Ōkouchi	Hiroaki Sakurai	2 February 2005
Chamo arrives at Mahora Academy to personally bring a letter to Negi, but this ermine's visit is for more than an errand: Chamo's real intention was to find Negi a Pactio partner.
6	"A fronte praecipitium a tergo lupi" Transliteration: "Between a Rock and a Hard Place"	Yoshihisa Matsumoto	Ichirō Ōkouchi	Tamaki Nakatsu	9 February 2005
Evangeline starts her rampage against Negi as she victimizes several of her classmates.
7	"Fallaces sunt rerum species" Transliteration: "The Appearances of Things are Deceptive"	Tetsuya Endou	Ichirō Ōkouchi	Tetsuya Endou	16 February 2005
Negi learns ninja skills from Kaede. Upon his return, he forms a Probationary Contract with Asuna and the two set off to stalk and face Chachamaru.
8	"Omnes una manet nox" Transliteration: "One Night Befalls All of Us"	Nobuyoshi Habara	Ichirō Ōkouchi	Yasuo Iwamoto	23 February 2005
Negi finally faces Evangeline using his newfound skills. Chachamaru prevents Negi from winning. Chamo, knowing that Negi can't win on his own, brings Asuna to the sight of the fight. However, Asuna's Probationary Contract has run out, so they kiss and make a permanent partner contract. With Asuna on his side, Negi defeats Evangeline.
9	"Te capiam, cunicule sceleste!" Transliteration: "I'll Get You, Wascally Wabbit!"	Akihiro Enomoto	Ichirō Ōkouchi	Akihiro Enomoto	2 March 2005
On an errand towards the Tatsumiya Shrine, Negi is guided by the Narutaki twins (Walking Club).
10	"Ubi concordia, ibi victoria" Transliteration: "Where There is Harmony, There is Victory"	Hoshi Kusano	Ichirō Ōkouchi	Nagisa Miyazaki	9 March 2005
Class 2-A battles in a dodgeball match against some high school girls who are also smitten by Negi's looks.
11	"Cum tacent clamant" Transliteration: "When They Are Silent, They Are Shouting"	Yasunori Urata	Ichirō Ōkouchi	Tetsuya Endou	16 March 2005
Negi receives a laptop computer from the Academy, but neither he nor most of the class know what to do with it. Upon Chamo's suggestion, he urges the class to help him build a homepage. The class's new site then competes against that of a net idol who turns out to be one of their own.
12	"Aut disce aut discede" Transliteration: "Either Learn or Leave"	Takashi Yamamoto	Ichirō Ōkouchi	Harume Kosaka	23 March 2005
With his stint in Mahora on the line, Negi and the Baka Rangers (Asuna, Yue, Kaede, Fei Kū, and Makie) explore Library Island's basements for a magical book that will make his five class dunces smarter for the exams.
13	"Tamdiu discendum est, quamdiu vivas" Transliteration: "We Live and Learn"	Yoshihisa Matsumoto	Ichirō Ōkouchi	Yoshihisa Matsumoto	30 March 2005
Stuck for three days in one of Library Island's basements, Negi and the Baka Rangers manage to escape. The exam had already started once the group arrived at school, so the Baka Rangers had to take the exam in a separate classroom to prevent distraction to their other classmates. When the results came in, Class 2-A ended up with the lowest score of all 2nd year classes, prompting Negi to leave. When Negi is about to leave the school, Asuna and the rest of 2-A stops him from departing, telling him to stay. Afterwards, it turns out that 2-A got the second-highest score in the exams, only because Dean Konoe turned in the Baka Rangers' exams late. And Negi is able to stay at Mahora.
14	"Amicitiae nostrae memoriam spero sempiternam fore" Transliteration: "I Hope the Memory of Our Friendship Will Be Eternal"	Tamaki Nakatsu	Ichirō Ōkouchi	Tamaki Nakatsu	6 April 2005
Konoka causes a ruckus with Negi, in the process making a mess and breaking Asuna's alarm clock, making Asuna late for work in the process. Negi and Konoka venture to Harajuku to buy a new clock for Asuna, not knowing they are being stalked by the Cheerleaders (Kakizaki, Sakurako, and Madoka), on orders by Ayaka.
15	"Amicus certus in re incerta cernitur" Transliteration: "A Reliable Friend Is Perceived in an Uncertain Situation"	Yasunori Urata	Ichirō Ōkouchi	Tetsuya Endou	13 April 2005
Home in the family estate for the summer break, Ayaka gets a visit, to her delight, from Negi and, to her horror, the rest of the class. Ayaka's childhood memories with Asuna are also brought up, mentioning how Asuna made Ayaka smile and laugh again after she was saddened by her little brother's premature death.
16	"Amor tussisque non celantur" Transliteration: "Love and a Cough, Are Not Kept Secret"	Tetsuya Endou	Ichirō Ōkouchi	Tetsuya Endou	20 April 2005
To celebrate the end of the summer break, several of Negi's students hold a pillow fight in Mahora's old elementary school building, with Negi in the middle of everything.
17	"Nihil difficile amanti" Transliteration: "Nothing is Difficult for a Lover"	Akihiro Enomoto	Ichirō Ōkouchi	Akihiro Enomoto	27 April 2005
To help Nodoka confess her feelings to Negi, Yue gives amusement park tickets to the pair so they can have a date. Yue and Asuna follow to support the two of them.
18	"Amor ordinem nescit" Transliteration: "Love Does Not Recognize Rank"	Yasunori Urata	Ichirō Ōkouchi	Harume Kosaka	4 May 2005
Stunned by Nodoka's confession at the amusement park, Negi ponders on how to answer it. Meanwhile, inspired by Nodoka, Asuna bakes a cake for Professor Takahata's birthday.
19	"Verba volant, scripta manent" Transliteration: "Words Fly Away, Those Written Remain"	Seung-hui Son	Ichirō Ōkouchi	Yasuo Iwamoto	11 May 2005
Kazumi starts investigating about a classmate named Sayo Aisaka, whom everybody seems to not notice she is present, not even Kazumi herself. It turns out Sayo was a student of Mahora Academy during the 1940s — and is now a ghost.
20	"Nisi credidentis, non intelligentis" Transliteration: "Unless You Have Believed, You Will Not Understand"	Hibari Kurihara	Ichirō Ōkouchi	Yoshihisa Matsumoto	18 May 2005
Class 2-A finally make their trip to Kyoto, but a sinister group of mages sets its sights on Konoka.
21	"Nil desperandum!" Transliteration: "It Must Not at All be Despaired!"	Takashi Yamamoto	Ichirō Ōkouchi	Gou Yamamoto	25 May 2005
With Konoka's safety already in danger, Negi, Asuna, and Setsuna, along with several other students, do all they can to save her.
22	"Difficile est tristi fingere mente jocum" Transliteration: "It is Difficult to Make a Joke with a Sad Mind"	Yasunori Urata	Ichirō Ōkouchi	Harume Kosaka	1 June 2005
Negi asks Evangeline to teach him magic. Asuna is saddened when she sees Takahata together with Shizuna, Mahora's counselor.
23	"Memento mori" Transliteration: "Remember to Die"	Seung-hui Son	Ichirō Ōkouchi	Nobuyoshi Habara	1 June 2005
Asuna starts to recall her past, seeing flames in her dreams, and remembering the 10 year contract with the devil. Noticing how sad she felt (and without knowing about her past) Negi decided to ask the rest of his class to help him throw a surprise birthday party for Asuna. Unfortunately, tragedy would befall Class 2-A.
24	"Et arma et verba vulnerant" Transliteration: "Both Weapons and Words Wound"	Tetsuya Endou	Ichirō Ōkouchi	Tetsuya Endou	9 June 2005
Negi and the rest of Class 2-A are devastated by Asuna's death. Setsuna feels she has failed in her duty as bodyguard so she decides to leave Konoka and protect her from afar. Meanwhile, Negi is taking Asuna's death hard and tries to get Evangeline to bring Asuna back from the dead. Evangeline tells Negi there's no such magic in existence, and Negi breaks down and runs away. Yue finds him and can't keep her feelings back anymore, and tells Negi she loves him. Nodoka overhears and feeling irritated towards Nodoka on how she cannot bring herself to tell Negi how she feels, Yue decides to teach her a lesson about love by kissing Negi right in front of her. Prompting Nodoka to run off.
25	"Mors certa, hora incerta" Transliteration: "Death is Certain, the Time is Uncertain"	Akihiro Enomoto	Ichirō Ōkouchi	Akihiro Enomoto	15 June 2005
With the help of Lingshen and Satomi's time machine, Negi transports himself and Chamo to 1993 Germany to know more about Asuna's magic cancelling power and discover ways to bring her back in the present. In the process, Negi unknowingly takes along the rest of Class 2-A with him, who were trying to find him.
26	"Non mihi, non tibi, sed nobis" Transliteration: "Not for Me, Not for You, But For Us"	Nobuyoshi Habara (Note: Assisted by Hideya Takahashi.)	Ichirō Ōkouchi	Nobuyoshi Habara	22 June 2005
Negi forms a Probationary Contract with the rest of Class 2-A so they will help him fight the demons and break the contract between Asuna and the Demon King.
OVA	"Haru Special!?"; Transliteration: "Spring Special!?"	Shin Oonuma	Kenichi Kanemaki	Akiyuki Shinbo (Note: Uncredited.)	25 October 2006
OVA	"Natsu Special!?"; Transliteration: "Summer Special!?"	Takahiro Miura	Katsuhiko Takayama	Noboru Jitsuhara	25 November 2006

== Negima!? episodes ==
This section contains a list describing the episodes of the anime series Negima!? All of the episode titles in this series are treated as a quote (or set of quotes) by one or more of the characters in the series. The main English episode titles given below are the official ones as they were released. Some of the episode minor titles, however, are approximate translations of their literal titles.

The series was directed by Akiyuki Shinbo and Shin Oonuma, and Kenichi Kanemaki wrote the series composition. Kazuhiro Oota designed the characters, and Kei Haneoka composed the music. Oota and Noboru Jitsuhara served as the chief animation directors, with Kuniaki Masuda joining them for episode 25. Several episodes were produced outside of Shaft: episodes 4, 7, 11, 15, 18, 21, and 24 to Studio Pastoral; episode 9 to Studio Ururu; episode 16 to Asread; episode 22 to A-Line; and episode 25 to Feel. (Note: All outsourcing studios credited in the ending to their respective episodes as Production Assistance (制作協力).)

No.	Title	Directed by	Written by	Storyboarded by	Original release date
1	"'What? 31 students right off the bat!' by Negi"; Transliteration: "'E~h, Ikinari 31-nin tte Iwarete mo!' by Negi" (Japanese: 「え〜っ、いきなり31人って言われても!」 by ネギ)	Shin Oonuma	Kenichi Kanemaki	Shin Oonuma	4 October 2006
Negi arrives at Mahora Academy with the duty of being a teacher there, just as a vampire (or a chupacabra) begins to attack the students of his new class.
2	"'No way! That's what you do for a probationary contract!?' by Asuna"; Transliteration: "'Usso, Karikeiyaku tte Sonna Koto su n no!?' by Asuna" (Japanese: 「うっそ、仮契約ってそんなことすんの!?」 by 明日菜)	Yukihiro Miyamoto	Kenichi Kanemaki	Michio Fukuda	11 October 2006
Negi discovers that Evangeline is the vampire who is targeting his other students.
3	"'Oh-ho, so that's how a probationary contract card is used.' by Evangeline"; Transliteration: "'Hoo, Karikeiyaku Kaado wa Sou Yatte Tsukau no ka' by Eva" (Japanese: 「ほー、仮契約カードはそうやって使うのか」 by エヴァ)	Koutarou Tamura	Kenichi Kanemaki	Michio Fukuda	18 October 2006
Evangeline battles for Negi's blood, and Asuna agrees to make a provisional contract to stand against her.
4	"'Teacher...... It's my first time......' by Nodoka"; Transliteration: "'Sensei...... Watashi Hajimete nan desu......' by Nodoka" (Japanese: 「先生……私初めてなんです……」 by のどか)	Ryouki Kamitsubo	Katsuhiko Takayama	Ryouki Kamitsubo	25 October 2006
Negi discovers the disappearance of the mysterious Star Crystal as two bizarre emissaries arrive to take control of the matter. Nodoka becomes Negi's second partner after the two and Asuna are attacked by a perpetrator.
5	"'Security deposits and key fees are expensive in Tokyo. Wait, that's not what the probationary contract's about?' by Konoka"; Transliteration: "'Tōkyō wa Shikikin Reikin Takai naa, yūte Karikeiyaku tte Sou iu Imi Chigaun?' by Konoka" (Japanese: 「東京は敷金礼金高いなぁ、ゆーて仮契約ってそういう意味ちがうん?」 by 木乃香)	Tatsuya Oishi	Katsuhiko Takayama	Tatsuya Oishi	1 November 2006
Nodoka experiments with her new magic book which can read the minds of others. Konoka establishes a provisional contract with Negi. An evil force takes control of three of Negi's students.
6	"'Pardon me....... Might I not be excused with either the forehead or the cheek?' by Setsuna"; Transliteration: "'Sumimasen...... Odeko ka Hoppe de Yurushite Moraenai deshou ka?' by Setsuna" (Japanese: 「すみません……おでこかほっぺで許してもらえないでしょうか?」 by 刹那)	Yoshinari Saitou	Katsuhiko Takayama	Yoshinari Saitou	8 November 2006
Negi and his 3 new partners must face off against Kaede, Yuuna, and Chisame, who are being controlled by the same evil being who has been attacking the school. After initial failure against them, Setsuna gets a provisional contract to release them.
7	"'Um... I think there are some good things about not being seen, but I do think there are times when it's better to be seen.' by Sayo"; Transliteration: "'Anoo...Mienakute mo ii Koto ga Aru to Omou n desu kedo, Mieta Hou ga ii Koto tte iu no mo Aru to Omou n desu' by Sayo" (Japanese: 「あのー…見えなくてもいいことがあると思うんですけど、見えた方がいいことっていうのもあると思うんです」 by さよ)	Yukihiro Miyamoto	Kenichi Kanemaki	Kazuki Tsunoda	15 November 2006
Sayo, Class 3-A's resident ghost is finally noticed by Negi and is befriended by him. Wanting to make more friends in the class, she unintentionally causes havoc among the girls.
8	"'Professor; please make us adults.' by Fuka, Fumika"; Transliteration: "'Sensei, Watashi-tachi o Otona ni shite kudasai♥' by Fuuka, Fumika" (Japanese: 「先生、私たちをオトナにしてください♥」 by 風香·史伽)	Koutarou Tamura	Katsuhiko Takayama	Michio Fukuda	22 November 2006
To learn more about the Star Crystals and who might be after them, Negi and his partners travel deep into the mysterious Mahora Library Island while Fuuka, Fumika and Kaede also explore the vast book repository. The twins become Negi's newest contracts.
9	"You Hide the 'Heart' with a 'Sword' and Read It as Ninja. It Is a Little Different Than How You Write 'Serious' and Read It as 'For Real.' by Kaede"; Transliteration: "'Kokoro' wo 'Yaiba' de Kakushite 'Shinobi' to Yomu. 'Honki' to Kaite `Maji` to Yomu no to wa Chotto Chigau de Gozaru by Kaede" (Japanese: 「"心"を"刃"で隠して"忍"と読む. "本気"と書いて"マジ"と読むのとはチョット違うでござる」by 楓)	Ryouki Kamitsubo	Katsuhiko Takayama	Osamu Tadokoro	29 November 2006
During the spring break, Negi and his partners go on a camping trip. Negi demonstrates his magic while a certain ninja trainee makes a contract with him.
10	"'Professor Negi went behind my back?! I shall never condone such a thing!' by Ayaka"; Transliteration: "'Watakushi ni Kakurete Negi-sensei to? Sonna koto Zettai ni Mitomemasen wa!' by Ayaka" (Japanese: 「私に隠れてネギ先生と?そんなこと絶対に認めませんわ!」 by あやか)	Yukihiro Miyamoto	Kenichi Kanemaki	Takashi Yamazaki	6 December 2006
Class President Ayaka is suspicious of certain classmates who are always with Negi and begins to spy on them. Negi and his partners must deal with another enemy and four more possessed students as Kaede and the Twins' contracts are invoked.
11	"'Huh, so the Baron is a kind of rose. I thought it was a kind of potato.' by Haruna"; Transliteration: "'Hee Danshaku tte Bara no Shurui datta n da. O-imo ka to Omotteta yo' by Haruna" (Japanese: 「へー男爵って薔薇の種類だったんだ。おイモかと思ってたよ」 by ハルナ)	Jirou Fujimoto	Kenichi Kanemaki	Takashi Yamazaki	13 December 2006
Asuna shifts the focus of the Chupacabra Research Club to find and capture the Black Rose Baron. Haruna and Yue witness Negi using his magic and persuade Nodoka to reveal on Negi's secret. Haruna then makes her provisional contract.
12	"'After much quibbling, in the end it all comes down to is how you feel.' by Yue"; Transliteration: "'Maa, Iroiro to Rikutsu o Koneta Tokoro de, Todo no Tsumari wa Kimochi Hitotsu na Wake desu ga' by Yue" (Japanese: 「まあ、いろいろと理屈をこねたところで、とどのつまりは気持ちひとつなわけですが」 by 夕映)	Masayuki Iimura	Kenichi Kanemaki	Ryouki Kamitsubo	20 December 2006
Negi and his Ministra Magi search for Yue, who tries to avoid them and making a provisional contract. Yue eventually makes the contract with Negi. Many from Negi's homeroom, Motsu and Shichimi, witness the kiss, and Negi is turned into a Chupacabra.
13	"'Rather Than a Question of You Being the Enemy, the Issue Is Really Whether or Not You Are a Nuisance to the Master.' by Chacha"; Transliteration: "'Teki ka Douka to Iu yori mo Master no Jamaka Douka ga Mondai na no Desu' by Chacha" (Japanese: 「敵かどうかと言うことよりもマスターの邪魔かどうかが問題なのです」by 茶々)	Yoshinari Saitou	Kenichi Kanemaki	Michio Fukuda	27 December 2006
While stuck in a Welsh castle, the entire class learns of Negi's secret and a fairy attacks the class. With no other options, the class runs and are split into groups. Meanwhile, Negi is confronted by images of Nekane and Anya.
14	"'Frankly speaking, in the face of magic, scientific theory might as well be nonexistent.' by Satomi"; Transliteration: "'Kagaku Riron mo, Mahou Aite ja Atte nai you na mono desu, Hakkiri Itte' by Satomi" (Japanese: 「科学理論も、魔法相手じゃあってないようなものです、はっきり言って」 by 葉加瀬)	Shin Oonuma	Kenichi Kanemaki	Michio Fukuda	4 January 2007
Restoration of Negi's human form is made possible after pactios with the remainder of the class. The group finds a way to escape the Welsh castle only to end up at a ruined Mahora Academy.
15	"'The Class Is Growing Disquiet at the Unexpected Turn of Events. So They`re Getting Louder? 15 Points.' by Mana, Zaji"; Transliteration: "'Yokisenu Tenkai de Class ni Douyou ga Hirogatteru na" by Mana "Sorette, Dou yo?' by Zaji '15 Ten' by Mana" (Japanese: 「予期せぬ展開でクラスに動揺が広がってるな」by真名 「それって, どーよー?」byザジ 「15点」by真名)	Koutarou Tamura	Kenichi Kanemaki	Keizō Kusakawa	10 January 2007
Negi's students divide into three teams in order to live in the ruined Mahora Academy, find out more information about the Star Crystals, and find a way out of the ruined world.
16	"'Yesterday's Foe Is Today's Friend. Good Enough Friends to Have Fights. No Doesn't Always Mean No.' by En, Sakurako"; Transliteration: "'Kyou no Teki wa Kyou no Tomo' by Misa 'Kenka Suru Hodo Naka ga Ii' by En 'Iya yo Iya yo mo Suki no Uchi!?' by Sakurako" (Japanese: 「昨日の敵は今日の友」by美砂 「喧嘩するほど仲がいい」by 円 「いやよいやよも好きのうち!」by 桜子)	Masayuki Iimura	Kenichi Kanemaki	Yoshiaki Iwasaki	17 January 2007
An argument between Asuna and Ayaka results in competition in a series of challenges. However, when a Dark Seed magic appears, Ayaka recalls her friendship with Asuna and uses her Armor form to rescue her.
17	"'Natsumi, Family Will Always Be the Home Run King of Bonds. Don`t You Agree? I Don`t Understand What You Mean at All, Chizuru.' by Chizuru, Natsumi"; Transliteration: "'Natsumi, Kazoku wa Yappari Kizuna no Homerun Ou ne' by Chizuru 'Zenzen Wakannai yo, Chizune (Namida)' by Natsumi" (Japanese: 「夏美, 家族はやっぱり絆のホームラン王ね」by 千鶴 「全然わかんないよ, ちづ姉(涙)」by 夏美)	Yukihiro Miyamoto	Kenichi Kanemaki	Michio Fukuda	24 January 2007
Nekane, Negi's sister, is discovered in the Mahora campus bath by Asuna and Konoka. And after much suspicion, by Konoka and Setsuna, it is revealed that the Black Rose Baron is in fact, Nekane. Kū invokes her Pactio form...with unexpected results.
18	"'There's a Bastard Who Gets All Happy with Secrets, Then Reveals Them, and It Really Pisses Me Off. Chiu-Chiu Is Going to Get Angry Too! Really Mad!' by Chisama, Chiu"; Transliteration: "'Himitsu Dattsu to Yorokonde Barashita Garu Yasu ga Irushi!' by Chisame 'Chiu Chiu mo Okocchauzo Bunbuun' by Chiu" (Japanese: 「秘密だっつーと喜んでバラしたがるやつがいるし!」by 千雨 「ちうちうも怒っちゃうぞ~♪ ぷんぷ~ん♪」by ちう)	Jirou Fujimoto	Kenichi Kanemaki	Keizō Kusakawa	31 January 2007
Despite her Black Rose baron identity revealed, Nekane continues to live among class 3-A.
19	"'It's great to go back to being a kid again and having fun. Although, I can have fun without going back to being a kid, too.' by Kazumi"; Transliteration: "'Dōshin ni Kaette Asobu tte Ii yo nē. Dōshin ni Kaennakute mo Asobu kedo nē.' by Kazumi" (Japanese: 「童心に返って遊ぶっていいよねー。童心に返んなくても遊ぶけどねー」 by 和美)	Shin Oonuma	Katsuhiko Takayama	Naoyuki Tatsuwa	7 February 2007
With almost all of class 3-A in Suka form with child-like behavior, Negi becomes a babysitter. His staff is broken in the process. Nekane advises Negi to have fun and repairs the staff.
20	"'They say, bigger the blander; but that's not necessarily true in actuality.' by Satsuki"; Transliteration: "'Ōkii to Ōaji da tte Iu kedo Jitsu wa Sou de mo nai n da yo' by Satsuki" (Japanese: 「大きいと大味だって言うけど実はそうでもないんだよ」 by 五月)	Takahiro Miura	Kenichi Kanemaki	Tomonori Kogawa (Note: Under the pseudonym Otokanbun (音間聞).)	14 February 2007
Due to a series of mishaps, Eva becomes a giant. Negi and the gang must endure the attack of the 50-Foot Doll Master.
21	"'A Man Silently Eats His Ramen Takamichi. What the Hell Does That Even Mean?' by Takahata, Kamo"; Transliteration: "'Kan wa Damatte Ramen, Takamichi' by Takahata 'Nanda Sorya!?' by Kamo" (Japanese: 「漢はだまってラーメンたかみち」by 高畑 「何だそりゃ!?」by カモ)	Yukihiro Miyamoto	Katsuhiko Takayama	Michio Fukuda	21 February 2007
Yue becomes distraught over her feelings towards Negi and how it may affect her friendship with Nodoka. Powerless, Chachamaru and Evangeline remain stranded at their house surrounded by water.
22	"'Aiya! Something strange is beginning to happen! This must surely be the end of the world!' by Lingshen"; Transliteration: "'Aiya, Nanyara Myou na koto Okorihajimeta ne! Kore, Kitto Sekai no Owari yo!' by Lingshen" (Japanese: 「あいや、何やら妙なコト起こり始めたネ!コレ、きっと世界の終わりヨ!」 by 鈴音)	Yoshinobu Tokumoto	Kenichi Kanemaki	Michio Fukuda	28 February 2007
The evil power harassing the group suddenly increases activity just when a valuable tip from Chizuru reveals the mastermind behind the Star Crystals. Lingshen Chao's Armor Card power is revealed, while Eva falls prey to the Star Crystals.
23	"'Wait, You Can`t Do That, Negi! That's Right, Because We're Your Partners!' by Hiroshi, Ako"; Transliteration: "'Chotto Sore wa Nai yo, Negi-kun' by Hiroshi 'So ya de, Uchira Partner Yanka!' by Ako" (Japanese: 「ちょっとそれはないよ, ネギく~ん」by 裕奈 「そやで, うちらパートナーやんか!」by 亜子)	Yukihiro Miyamoto; Koutarou Tamura	Kenichi Kanemaki	Yuusuke Kamata	7 March 2007
Anya, possessing Evangeline through the Star Crystal, turns Asuna against Negi and many of his allies into stone. But with the help of his remaining students, he's able to defeat her by making a Pactio with the vampire, which, alongside Chachamaru, completes his Pactio collection but does not get them out of trouble.
24	"'Professor Negi, It Appears This Is the Climax. Let's All Go Home Together, Negi!' by Akira, Misora"; Transliteration: "'Negi-sensei, Douyara Climax Desu' by Akira 'Minna de Issho ni Kaerou ne, Negi-kun!' by Misora" (Japanese: 「ネギ先生, どうやらクライマックスです」by アキラ 「みんなで一緒に帰ろうね, ネギくん!」by 美空)	Jirou Fujimoto	Kenichi Kanemaki	Yoshiaki Okumura	14 March 2007
Negi, trapped in a magical dimension, is confronted by the controlled Anya. With the assistance of all of his students, he is finally able to save her and allows everyone to escape from the magical wasteland.
25	"'And with That, the Case Is Closed!' by Kataribe"; Transliteration: "'Kore nite, Ikken Rakuchaku!?' by Kataribe" (Japanese: 「これにて, 一件落着!?」by 語りべ)	Shinji Ushiro	Katsuhiko Takayama	Michio Fukuda	21 March 2007
Life for class 3-A and company return to normal as they prepare a party for Anya. Yet remnants of a dark power still remain. Anya, Negi, and three Pactio summons put the power away.
26	"'I Will Not Say That I Am Lonely! Because, I Have Faith That We Will Surely Meet Again!' by Negi"; Transliteration: "'Sabishii Nante Iimasen! Datte, Kitto Mata Aeru to Shinjitemasukara!' by Negi" (Japanese: 「寂しいなんて言いません! だって, きっとまた会えると信じてますから!」by ネギ)	Shin Oonuma (Note: Assisted by Tomoyuki Itamura.)	Katsuhiko Takayama	Shin Oonuma; Michio Fukuda	28 March 2007
When a mysterious black rose appears, Negi becomes convinced that his father Nagi is still out there. Upon the urging of the class to let them help him find Nagi, he gives them permission by transforming the class into their Pactio forms.

== Magister Negi Magi: Mahō Sensei Negima!! episodes ==
This section lists the episode titles of the live action series version Magister Negi Magi: Mahō Sensei Negima!!

#	Title	Original airdate
1	"Magister-Negi-Magi"; Transliteration: "Magisteru.Negi.Magi" (Japanese: マギステル·ネギ·マギ)	4 October 2007
Negi arrives at Mahora Academy to begin his duty as a teacher. While trying to save a dog from an oncoming bus, Negi inadvertently reveals his magical powers to Asuna, one of his students.
2	"Otome-no-Ryōiki"; Transliteration: "Otome.no.Ryōiki" (Japanese: オトメ·ノ·リョウイキ)	11 October 2007
A class 3-A dodgeball game turns into a one-on-one duel between Asuna and Ayaka. The other members of the class gradually lose interest and pursue their own activities. As the match concludes, it is revealed that Asuna purposely started the feud to keep Ayaka from depression on the anniversary of her little brother's death.
3	"Doki-Magi-Idol"; Transliteration: "Doki.Magi.Aidoru" (Japanese: ドギ·マギ·アイドル)	18 October 2007
Moody student Chisame laments what her class has become. Back in her room, Negi discovers Chisame's secret identity - mega-popular net idol Chiu! Distraught by this discovery, Chisame packages Negi up and sends him off on a shipping trip. When the girls of 3-A attempt to hold an idol competition, Chisame is disgusted at their lack of experience and decides to show them how it's done.
4	"Koi-Suru-Otome"; Transliteration: "Koi.Suru.Otome" (Japanese: コイ·スル·オトメ)	25 October 2007
Konoka is set up for an arranged marriage, an omiai. Setsuna accompanies Konoka, and attempts to fight back the feelings she holds for her. Konoka decides not to take up the arranged marriage.
5	"Pa-Para-Paparazzi"; Transliteration: "Pa.Para.Paparacchi" (Japanese: パッ·パラ·パパラッチ)	1 November 2007
Kazumi accidentally witnesses Negi's magic, and follows him around attempting to get her "scoop". After Negi saves her from injury, Kazumi decides to keep Negi's secret.
6	"Yu-Rari-Yura Yura"; Transliteration: "Yu.Rari.Yura Yura" (Japanese: ユ·ラリ·ユラユラ)	8 November 2007
Ghost student Sayo accidentally reveals herself to the class. In her attempts to calm them, she merely ends up terrifying them, and becomes the victim of 3-A's ghostbusting team, led by Mana. Kazumi's camera captures an image of Sayo crying, and the girls realise that she is a friendly spirit after all.
7	"San-Po-Tekuteku"; Transliteration: "San.Po.Tekuteku" (Japanese: サン·ポ·テクテク)	15 November 2007
Kaede and the Narutaki twins participate in the walking club, and explore the academy grounds. Kaede teaches the twins to tune into the earth, and through this they are able to rescue some distressed objects. The twins discuss their fear of growing up and being separated, but Kaede assures them they will always be together.
8	"Suki-Kiss-Dokidoki"; Transliteration: "Suki.Kisu.Dokidoki" (Japanese: スキ·キス·ドキドキ)	22 November 2007
While in the library, Nodoka finally confesses her feelings to Negi, witnessed by Yue, Haruna and Asuna. Nodoka rushes off in tears without waiting for a response.
9	"Ba-Ka-Ranger"; Transliteration: "Ba.Ka.Renjā" (Japanese: バ·カ·レンジャー)	29 November 2007
A rumour spreads that Negi will be fired if 3-A's test scores are not improved. Problem students Asuna, Yue, Fei Ku, Makie and Kaede gather for a cram session. Meanwhile, the Dean is sorely tempted by a pair of Shizuna's underwear. When the tests are marked, the group discovers that the rumour was false after all.
10	"Himitsu-No-Date"; Transliteration: "Himitsu.No.Dēto" (Japanese: ヒミツ·ノ·デート)	6 December 2007
Konoka and Negi venture out into the city together. They are followed and watched by Setsuna and Asuna, who believe they are on a date. When confronted, Konoka confesses that they had been looking for a birthday present for Setsuna: a sword sheath, with hand-made dolls of Konoka and Setsuna sewn on.
11	"Magister-Nagi-Magi"; Transliteration: "Magisteru.Nagi.Magi" (Japanese: マギステル·ナギ·マギ)	13 December 2007
A vampire is stalking the halls of Mahora, claiming first Makie and then Nodoka. Negi confronts the vampiress, who reveals herself to be Evangeline of 3-A. She and Chachamaru warn Negi that they will resume their attack on the next solar eclipse. The Dean explains to Negi that Evangeline is after his blood to free herself of a curse cast by Negi's father.
12	"Eva-Is-Lady"; Transliteration: "Eva.Izu.Redi" (Japanese: エヴァ·イズ·レディ)	20 December 2007
Negi uses his magic to explore Evangeline's memories, discovering that she was in love with his father, and imprisoned by him in Mahora. When Evangeline challenges Negi on the day of the solar eclipse, he forms a probationary contract with Asuna. Evangeline is defeated when her magic-restorative potion runs out, and she is saved from falling by Negi.
13	"Shizuna-no-Woheya"; Transliteration: "Shizuna.no.Woheya" (Japanese: シズナ·ノ·ヲヘヤ)	27 December 2007
Shizuna-sensei takes the viewers back old memory lane as she recaps past episodes.
14	"Magister-Negi-Colle"; Transliteration: "Magisteru.Negi.Koru" (Japanese: マギステル·ネギ·コレ)	10 January 2008
The girls hold a beauty contest to measure Negi's attraction to them. Hosted by Ayaka, the event features Negi strapped to a chair and the girls in their swimwear. When Asuna inadvertently enters the competition, she wins by a landslide, much to Ayaka's chagrin. Elsewhere in the school, the cheerleaders Misa, Madoka and Sakurako vanish, along with all memory of them.
15	"Con-Con-Sonocon"; Transliteration: "Kon.Kon.Sonokon" (Japanese: コン·コン·ソノコン)	17 January 2008
When the Chao Bao Xi is attacked by an ex-professional wrestler, Konoka and Asuna visit him to bring him food. Asuna challenges the wrestler to a series of endurance tests, to help him get back into shape. Seeing each other as equals, they decide to call the contest a draw. Misora and Zazie fall victim to the same fate that befell the cheerleaders, vanishing from memory.
16	"Yume-Miru-Kikai"; Transliteration: "Yume.Miru.Kikai" (Japanese: ユメ·ミル·キカイ)	24 January 2008
Chachamaru malfunctions, and when she "wakes up", she discovers she is a normal, living human. She enjoys being human, particularly the ability to change her hairstyle. However, when she wakes up for real, she discovers it was merely a dream. Meanwhile, Fei Ku and Satsuki become the latest to disappear.
17	"Kagami-Yo-Yagami"; Transliteration: "Kagami.Yo.Yagami" (Japanese: カガミ·ヨ·ヤガミ)	31 January 2008
Makie becomes depressed that she is always seen to be childish. However, her friends reassure her that it doesn't matter, because that's just who she is. Meanwhile Yuna, Ako, Akira and Makie becomes the next to disappear, and Negi senses that there is something amiss at Mahora Academy.
18	"Yaki-Moki-Koigataki"; Transliteration: "Yaki.Moki.Koigataki" (Japanese: ヤキ·モキ·コイガタキ)	7 February 2008
Outside the academy, Chizuru and Natsumi discover that the building is surrounded by an invisible, impenetrable barrier. As Chizuru and Natsumi run back inside, they vanish. Negi senses that this has happened, but cannot recall who he is thinking about.
19	"Saki-Saku-Tantaku"; Transliteration: "Saki.Saku.Tantaku" (Japanese: サキ·サク·タンタク)	14 February 2008
Fuka and Fumika venture into the woods to fetch water, as the supplies are beginning to run low. They enter a dimensional loop from which they cannot escape, and are saved from Kaede. Before vanishing, Kaede presents the twins with a letter, which they are told to deliver to Negi. Kaede has now disappeared without a trace in the Mahora forest.
20	"Dogi-Magi-Adult"; Transliteration: "Dogi.Magi.Adaruto" (Japanese: ドギ·マギ·アダルト)	21 February 2008
Professor Takahata becomes seriously worried about the welfare of Class 3-A now that he cannot contact them. The dean of Negi's magic school in Wales visits Mahora to investigate the class's disappearance. Sayo appears in the counselling room, and offers her assistance. The Mahora staff agree that Sayo should be sent over to the other dimension to make contact with 3-A.
21	"Shiru-Shiru-Himitsu"; Transliteration: "Shiru.Shiru.Himitsu" (Japanese: シル·シル·ヒミツ)	28 February 2008
Negi makes a Probationary Contract with Nodoka as her friends Haruna and Yue, along with Sayo, become the latest victims of the sinister force.
22	"Aruyo-No-Dekigoto"; Transliteration: "Aruyo.No.Dekigoto" (Japanese: アルヨ·ノ·デキゴト)	6 March 2008
After slowly discovering that she has healing powers, Konoka makes a Pactio with Negi and uses her newfound powers to heal Fuka, who has been jolted by the magical barrier while sleepwalking. Negi leaves to get to the bottom of the strange events.
23	"Kare-Tono-Omoige"; Transliteration: "Kare.Tono.Omoige" (Japanese: カレ·トノ·オモイデ)	13 March 2008
Chao attempts to convince the rest of the class that Negi is to blame for all the events that have happened recently. However, the class remembers all of the good things Negi has done to help them in the past, such as helping Chisame find her confidence in her true self and saving Kazumi from death. This strengthens the class's faith that Negi will save them. Finally, Chao reveals her evil plan to her classmates, especially her Cassiopeia watch.
24	"Doke-Nai-Akumu"; Transliteration: "Doke.Nai.Akumu" (Japanese: トケ·ナイ·アクム)	20 March 2008
The remaining members of Negi's class, not including Setsuna and Mana, attempt to rescue Negi by heading to the World Tree but are caught in Chao's time loop whenever they get close. Chao then proceeds to defeat the rest of the class one by one by messing with their minds via images of each individual's past. She then puts each student in a statue position within her alternate dimension hallway (seen in the intros of just about every episode). At the end, only Asuna, Setsuna, and Mana are left to save Negi as he is slowly being turned into a crystal statue.
25	"Hon-Tono-Mahou"; Transliteration: "Hon.Tono.Mahō" (Japanese: ホン·トノ·マホウ)	27 March 2008
Asuna discovers almost all of her classmates frozen as statues in Chao's alternate dimension hallway. Meanwhile, Setsuna and Mana attempt to head to the World Tree to save Negi but are prevented due to Chao's talismans. Sayo, being able to resist becoming a statue due to her being a ghost, tells Asuna that she can rescue the rest of the class due to her magic nullification ability. Asuna then proceeds to use her ability "pactio style" by giving each classmate a short kiss to undo the spell. Asuna then proceeds to face Chao before Negi can be fully crystalized and as a result shatter into pieces. Asuna convinces Chao that her past sorrow and troubles don't exist in her current situation as the entire class just wants their friend back and wants to see Chao's true smile. As a result, Chao lets Asuna climb the crystal stairs, even though she is injured, to save Negi. Asuna does not make it in time to save Negi and Chao debated returning to the future, but seeing how the love for one another was true in the class, she decided to reverse time instead to allow Asuna to rescue Negi in time. After everything returns to normal, Negi and the rest of class 3-A say "Thank you" to Chao.
26	"Show-Mast-Go On"; Transliteration: "Shō.Masuto.Gō On" (Japanese: ショウ·マスト·ゴーオン)	16 April 2008 (Magamega)
Negi is assigned a test to see if he is worthy of being a Magister Magi and is sealed within the school via a magic barrier. He then proceeds to defeat Shizuna-sensei, Professor Takahata, and Dean Konoe in short duels. After defeating Dean Konoe, the magical barrier is dissolved, allowing Negi to head for the concert prepared by his class.
