= List of Big Windup! episodes =

North American first DVD volume cover

Big Windup! is a Japanese anime television series based on Asa Higuchi's manga series Ōkiku Furikabutte. The story follows Ren Mihashi, a pitcher who was blamed by his middle school team for their string of losses, and as a result suffers from low self-esteem and transfers to a different high school. There, the school's first baseball team is being formed and Mihashi reluctantly joins as their Ace Pitcher. Assisted by his new teammates (and especially the catcher, Takaya Abe), he grows in stature, confidence and skill, helping his team excel with his own abilities.

The series was produced by A-1 Pictures and directed by Tsutomu Mizushima, with Yōsuke Kuroda handling series composition, Takahiko Yoshida designing the characters and Shirō Hamaguchi composing the music. The first season ran for 25 episodes and was broadcast in Japan on various Japan News Network stations, including TBS and MBS from April 13 to September 28, 2007. (Note: TBS listed the air for the series on Thursday at 25:25, which is effectively Friday at 1:25 a.m. JST.) The first opening theme is "Dramatic" (ドラマチック, Doramachikku), performed by Base Ball Bear, while the first ending theme is "Medaka no Mita Niji" (メダカの見た虹), performed by Kozue Takada. The second opening theme is "Seishun Line" (青春ライン), performed by Ikimonogakari, while the second ending theme is "Arigatō" (ありがとう), performed by SunSet Swish.

A second season, Natsu no Taikai-hen (〜夏の大会編〜; "Summer Tournament Chapter"), aired for 13 episodes from April 2 to June 25, 2010. (Note: TBS listed the air dates for the series on Thursday at 25:25, which is effectively Friday at 1:25 a.m. JST; the first and last episode aired at 1:39 a.m. and 2:30 a.m., respectively.) The story picks up where the first season left off, as the Nishiura High School baseball team continues to compete in the High School Baseball Invitational Tournament with the aim of playing in the finals at legendary Hanshin Kōshien Stadium. The opening theme is "Natsuzora" (夏空), performed by Galileo Galilei, and the ending theme is "Shisō Densha" (思想電車), by CureaL.

The series was licensed in North America by Funimation in 2008. It was released on two DVD sets on August 18 and September 26, 2009, respectively. Lance Heiskell, marketing director of Funimation, announced in January 2010 that the company had no plans to release the second season. The series debuted on the Funimation Channel on March 14, 2011. The second season was licensed by Right Stuf and released on DVD through its Nozomi Entertainment label on November 1, 2016.

== Episodes ==
=== Season 1 (2007) ===
No.	Title	Directed by	Written by	Original release date
1	"The Real Ace"; Transliteration: "Honto no ēsu" (Japanese: ホントのエース)	Tsutomu Mizushima	Yōsuke Kuroda	April 13, 2007
Mihashi is a freshman in high school, and has just transferred to Nishiura High School, a school not known for its baseball. However, after he is forced into joining the team by its new female coach, he befriends the catcher Abe, who becomes his main supporter in the future.
2	"The Catcher's Role"; Transliteration: "Kyatchā no yakuwari" (Japanese: キャッチャーの役割)	Hiroyuki Hata	Yōsuke Kuroda	April 20, 2007
The baseball team at Nishiura High School heads out to a training camp. As everyone is preparing for their first practice match against Mihashi's old school, Mihoshi High School, Abe realizes that the catcher's role is not just on the field but is also to encourage and to protect the pitcher and his well being.
3	"The Practice Game"; Transliteration: "Renshūjiai" (Japanese: 練習試合)	Yasutaka Yamamoto	Kōichi Taki	April 27, 2007
The practice game between Nishiura High and Mihoshi, Mihashi's old school, is about to start. However, before the game starts Mihashi loses his confidence and runs behind the club building. Hatake, the catcher from Mihoshi, followed him and begins to harass him to the point of threatening to break his arm for the lost games in middle school. It becomes apparent that Mihashi's lack of confidence stems from the constant bullying and scorn of his former teammates. Abe rescues Mihashi, he also convinced him to play and thus the game begins.
4	"Play Ball"; Transliteration: "Purei" (Japanese: プレイ)	Michita Shiraishi	Toride Sawamura	May 4, 2007
Mihashi is pitching nicely, outing all of Mihoshi's batters so far. At the top of the 2nd inning, Tajima easily hits Kanō's forkball. Hanai tries to compete with Tajima and do the same, but strikes out instead. Momoe then stresses the importance of the team to work together, because Tajima needs the help of his team mates in order to score runs since he is too small to hit home runs on his own. During the bottom of the 2nd, Kanō explains to Oda the secret behind Mihashi's fastball, saying that it is "faster than a slow fastball", which is why it is hard to hit.
5	"Don't Get Careless!"; Transliteration: "Te o nuku na" (Japanese: 手を抜くな)	Jun Matsumoto	Shōgo Yasukawa	May 11, 2007
With nice team work, Nishiura is able to score two consecutive runs easily. Meanwhile, tension is rising between Kanō and the rest of his team. They end up having an argument, but eventually cooled down and resolved to win the game against Nishiura to prove once and for all that Kanō is the better pitcher. Witnessing from the sidelines, Mihashi seems to be longing to join back with his old team, but Abe decides to do his best to get Mihashi to acknowledge him and Nishiura as the team in which Mihashi belongs to.
6	"The Requirement for Pitchers"; Transliteration: "Tōshu no jōken" (Japanese: 投手の条件)	Natsuo Sōta	Kazuho Hyōdō	May 18, 2007
Going into the bottom of the 7th inning, Kanō finally goes into detail about how great Mihashi's control really is, and Mihoshi's substitute coach comes up with a plan. Abe tried to aim for a perfect game (not letting any opposing players to get onto base), but because Mizutani missed the ball, the perfect game was lost. Abe then was determined to have a no hit and no run game, but since Oda followed the coach's plan, Oda was able to assist his teammate to run home. To make matters worse, Hatake was able to rally by hitting a home run, placing Mihoshi in the lead. However, despite the devastation, Mihashi still has the will to keep on pitching.
7	"I Want to Play Baseball"; Transliteration: "Yakyū shitai" (Japanese: 野球したい)	Tarō Iwasaki	Hideki Shirane	May 25, 2007
Through good teamwork, Nishiura was able to rally and gain back the lead. After winning the game, Mihashi's old teammates finally acknowledge their mistakes and ask for his forgiveness and to come back. Mihashi declines, but he says that he liked getting the chance to play a proper game of baseball with everyone. After returning to their training camp, Mihashi finally is able to fall asleep.
8	"An Amazing Pitcher?"; Transliteration: "Sugoi tōshu?" (Japanese: スゴイ投手?)	Hiroyuki Hata	Yasunori Ide; Yōsuke Kuroda	June 1, 2007
On the way to practice, Mihashi meets Sakaeguchi and learns about the Senior League, Abe was teamed up with an "amazing pitcher". During practice, Shiga-sensei teaches all of the players how to meditate, saying that it will help them build a relaxing reflex that they can use when they are in a pinch. Thus, the team starts to perform a 5-minute daily routine of meditating before practice. After a bit of practice, Momoe takes the team to go see a prefecture tournament game, Urawa Composite vs. Musashino First. There it turns out that the "amazing pitcher", Haruna, pitches for Musashino.
9	"The Past"; Transliteration: "Kako" (Japanese: 過去)	Yasutaka Yamamoto	Shōgo Yasukawa	June 8, 2007
Abe's past relationship with Haruna is revealed, showing the circumstances that led Abe to consider Haruna to be the worst pitcher instead of one of the best. However, instead of easing his worries after Abe's explanation, Mihashi is still extremely intimidated by Haruna because he sees how much of an impact Haruna has been in Abe's life.
10	"Bit by Bit"; Transliteration: "Chakuchaku to" (Japanese: ちゃくちゃくと)	Akira Tsuchiya	Michiko Yokote	June 15, 2007
In order to be able to play two practice games, everyone on the team must be able to play at least two different positions. At first, Mihashi is against the idea, but after being reassured that he is the ace of the team and that Abe will always be his catcher, Mihashi accepts the circumstances. Thus, Hanai and Oki have the role of substitute pitchers, while the substitute catcher is Tajima. At the end of practice, the team unanimously voted for Hanai to become captain, and Abe and Sakaeguchi become vice-captains. With finals coming up, the team decides to study altogether to make sure that everyone passes. Taking this opportunity in the guise of studying, Mihashi invites everyone to come to his house on his birthday. The team ends up celebrating not only Mihashi's birthday, but also the birthdays of Hanai and Suyama, whose birthdays had already passed. After eating, Abe shows the rest of the team how truly amazing Mihashi's control truly is by having Mihashi pitch at his target.
11	"Summer Begins"; Transliteration: "Natsu ga hajimaru" (Japanese: 夏がはじまる)	Takahiro Ikezoe	Kazuho Hyōdō	June 22, 2007
The Summer National Senior High School Baseball Championship Saitama Tournament is about to start. Overall, 170 schools in the area gathered together in order to draw lots to determine whom they would be playing against. Unfortunately, for Nishiura, Hanai's bad luck with lottery picking landed them against Tōsei for their first game. In order to prepare, Momoe makes the team start practice at 5 in the morning since Nishiura's field does not have any lighting for the team to practice late. After coming back from the tournament meeting, Hamada comes to greet the team and officially reunites with his childhood friend Mihashi. In addition, Hamada asks permission to start a cheer squad on behalf of the baseball team.
12	"The Cheer Squad"; Transliteration: "Ōen-dan" (Japanese: 応援団)	Ikehata Hiroshi	Toride Sawamura	June 29, 2007
During practice, the team, with the addition of Hamada, continues to meditate, but this time start to actively train their relaxing reflex to trigger with the presence of a third base runner. Momoe and Shiga stress to Hamada the importance of the cheer squad, because the mood of the audience can make a break the team's moral and ability to play.
13	"The Summer Tournament Starts"; Transliteration: "Natsutai kaishi" (Japanese: 夏大開始)	Shinichiro Kimura	Kōichi Taki	July 6, 2007
The team has been working hard to prepare for the game against Tōsei, to the point that even the team manager, Shinōka collapses from exhaustion because she had pulled an all-nighter writing a detailed report on Tōsei's battery and batters. Everyone is being worked up about the game, including all of the boys' mothers and the other members of the cheer squad and audience (over 200 other students) that Hamada was able to recruit.
14	"Go Get 'Em!"; Transliteration: "Idome!" (Japanese: 挑め!)	Tarō Iwasaki	Hideki Shirane	July 13, 2007
The first game of the summer tournament begins. Everyone is present, including the big crowd that Hamada recruited has to come to the game. Mihashi and the team are starting well; unfortunately, Tajima could not connect with any of the break balls thrown at him and gets struck out.
15	"The First Run"; Transliteration: "Senshu-ten" (Japanese: 先取点)	Katsumi Ono	Kazuho Hyōdō	July 20, 2007
The Tōsei batters are getting perplexed by Mihashi's pitching since the balls appear to be easy, but are hard to connect. During Nishiura's at bat, Tajima is able to steal (figure out) Takase's pitching motion, so he was able to guide Hanai into stealing second base. However, with two out, Tōsei tried to pick Mihashi out, since he was too far away from first base. It's a race to see whether Tōsei can out Mihashi, or if Hanai can reach home first.
16	"Don't Underestimate Him"; Transliteration: "Anadoru na" (Japanese: あなどるな)	Natsuo Sōta	Hideki Shirane	July 27, 2007
Tōsei still does not know what to make of Mihashi's pitches, and Nishiura is still hanging on. Nishiura had a chance to get another run in, but the Tōsei battery once again made Tajima strike out. During the bottom of the 3rd, Mihashi's female cousin, Ruri, arrived at the stadium to cheer for Mihashi.
17	"The Runner on Third"; Transliteration: "Sādo rannā" (Japanese: サードランナー)	Yasutaka Yamamoto	Shōgo Yasukawa	August 3, 2007
Tōsei comes back with a counter attack plan, playing to the basics and hitting grounders. Though Nishiura is still hanging onto their lead, they are playing hard defence. In addition, the team is starting to use their relaxing reflex, since there is a "third-base runner".
18	"Additional Runs"; Transliteration: "Tsuika-ten" (Japanese: 追加点)	Toshikatsu Tokoro	Toride Sawamura	August 10, 2007
After getting on base because of a dead ball caused by the rain, Mihashi and the rest of his team work hard in order to get one more run before the inning ends.
19	"Tousei's Real Power"; Transliteration: "Tōsei no jitsuryoku" (Japanese: 桐青の実力)	Hiromichi Matano	Kōichi Taki	August 17, 2007
Tōsei continues with their attack plan, concentrating on hitting Mihashi's curveball, and manage to get in one run. Nishiura gets into a little mishap, because Mihashi gets a nose bleed, making Abe worry about Mihashi's condition and whether or not he can pitch. However, it was lucky that this did not happen until after the 5th inning, so Mihashi was able to rest for a bit while the field underwent maintenance. The 6th inning does not progress much better for Nishiura, as Tōsei ties the score.
20	"Comeback"; Transliteration: "Gyakuten" (Japanese: 逆転)	Yasuhiro Geshi	Kōichi Taki	August 24, 2007
Though Nishiura is playing a good defence, the lucky breaks that Tōsei keep on having make the members of Nishiura seem clumsy. The mound becomes slipper as the rain pours down harder, causing Mihashi to lose his footing and throw a wild pitch, giving Tōsei the opportunity to steal another run. To make matters worse, Mihashi's fever is rising, but after Ruri tells him that Kanō and Mihoshi won their game, "Ren-Ren" has renewed strength and will to pitch the rest of the game.
21	"One More Run"; Transliteration: "Mō itten" (Japanese: もう一点)	Tarō Iwasaki	Kazuho Hyōdō	August 31, 2007
Tajima once again strikes out, but is able to help his team mates successfully steal bases once he enters the coaching box again. With a nice hit from Mizutani, Suyama gains another point for Nishiura. Hanai also tries to steal another run on the same play, but is stopped by Kawai. Tajima feels down because he has not been able to contribute any runs, but the other guys cheer him up by saying that they will get him another chance to bat once more.
22	"Defend!"; Transliteration: "Fusege!" (Japanese: 防げ!)	Atsushi Hori	Toride Sawamura	September 7, 2007
Tōsei takes several gamble plays and is able to get one more run in to take the lead once again. On the second attempt at a run, Mihashi paused briefly before throwing the ball back home, for he was afraid that Abe would be injured. Abe got angry with Mihashi but assured him that he would keep his promise not to be injured.
23	"Strictly"; Transliteration: "Genmitsu ni" (Japanese: ゲンミツに)	Yukio Nishimoto	Tsutomu Mizushima	September 14, 2007
Nishiura is desperate now to get their batters onto the plates in order to have a chance at winning. The team hangs in the game long enough for Tajima to have one more at bat chance, with two runners on third and second base, and two outs. Tajima is finally able to hit Takase's sinker, thus allowing Nishiura to take back the lead with two runs.
24	"The Conclusion"; Transliteration: "Ketchaku" (Japanese: 決着)	Tsutomu Mizushima	Yōsuke Kuroda	September 21, 2007
Now that they have the lead, Nishiura must make sure that they do not allow any more runs. Abe wants Mihashi to keep pitching his fastball, but Mihashi feels insecure, and is practically out of gas. Even still, Mihashi does not want to get off the mount and sticks in there until the very end. After losing the game, Tōsei is devastated but manage to congratulate Nishiura. Mihashi falls into a deep sleep after the game. Tōsei's back up catcher runs into Tajima and asks for his email address because he is in such awe of him
25	"After One Win"; Transliteration: "Hitotsu katte" (Japanese: ひとつ勝って)	Natsuo Sōta	Natsuo Sōta	September 28, 2007
Taking place one day after the big game, Mihashi is still sick and is ignoring Abe's text messages thinking he is mad at him for not giving up the mound. However, Tajima reveals that he and Izumi and going to Mihashi's for curry and Hanai and Abe tag along. Abe begins to mull over why Mihashi is ignoring him and concludes that perhaps Mihashi hates him. When they arrive at the house, Mihashi reveals he has lost 3kg making Abe furious and he begins to yell at Mihashi but stops and changes tactics which confuses Mihashi more. Tajima also reveals that he hurt his hand during his last at bat. As the boys eat, they reveal the reasons they all chose Nishiura and watch the recap of the games. Mihashi apologizes for not giving up the mound and Abe tells him that it was a lie, he never wanted him to give up the mound. Hanai shows Mihashi notes from the team meeting and the notes reveal how everyone praises Mihashi's pitching and he is shocked that they think so highly of him. Later, Mihashi calls Kanō and reports their win.
26 (SP)	"The Basics of the Basics"; Transliteration: "Kihon no kihon" (Japanese: 基本のキホン)	Yasutaka Yamamoto	Shōgo Yasukawa	August 19, 2007
(One year before the beginning of the story) Kaguyama feels intimidated by Haruna's presence on the baseball team for he feels that his positioned as the ace pitcher is threatened. Kaguyama wants to quit, but Haruna talks him out of it after telling Kaguyama about his own past. This episode only aired on BS-i/MBS TV's "Anime Shower" slot.

=== Season 2 (2010) ===
No.	Title	Directed by	Written by	Original release date
1	"What's Next?"; Transliteration: "Tsugi wa?" (Japanese: 次は?)	Tsutomu Mizushima	Yōsuke Kuroda	April 2, 2010
The episode begins with a combo play by Tajima and Mihashi in a gym period soccer game. Meanwhile, Shinooka is approached by her friends to become cheerleaders for the club's cheering party. During lunch break Mihashi, Izumi, Hanada and Tajima discuss the eventuality of making it into the news when Hanada brings up Momoe in the conversation over food. The team later attends a match between two schools, where the winner is scheduled to be Nishiura'a next opponent. Momoe also reveals the positions for the next game and displays her persuasive skills in convincing the injured Tajima to give up the cleanup hitter spot
2	"Sakitama" (Japanese: 崎玉)	Natsuo Sōta	Tsutomu Mizushima	April 9, 2010
The episode continues where the last one left off, i.e. with the Nishiura team watching the Sakitama match and is set off with the arrival of Mrs. Hanai and Mrs. Abe (Captain Hanai and catcher Abe's moms). They speak with Momoe about the game recording as well as little bit about Momoe's past, where it is revealed that she was the baseball club's manager in the past. The Nishiura team discusses Sakitama's catcher who is a first year but has a 100 batting average, while Abe checks on Mihashi and discovers that his loud voice is what stops him getting through to Mihashi. Finally after seeing Sakura Daiichi's homerun hit... Abe decides giving him a walk is the safest. Meanwhile, Hanada is warned against skipping school in order to support Nishiura during the match. In the end, under Abe's initiation, the team as a whole decides to aim for a called game. score: 0-2
3	"Round Three"; Transliteration: "3-Kaisen" (Japanese: 3回戦)	Susumu Mitsunaka	Susumu Mitsunaka	April 16, 2010
The episode begins with catching practice among the players of Nishiura, where through Sakaeguchi's speculations, the reason for Mihashi's obsession with the pitcher's mound is revealed! Just before the game begins, with Sakitama having chosen offense, Momoe tells Hanai that he can be the hero today, a statement which slightly throws him off. The game begins and Hanai does a squeeze play as cleanup, however Tajima asks him not to be content with just this and Hanai is at a loss for how to react. During defense Mihashi and Abe give Sakura a walk as planned, and Mihashi handles the jeering from the crowds. While during offence Abe steals a base as catcher Daichi Sakura misinterprets a sacrificial bunt and Mihashi shows his conviction to help with the called game by trying to hit the ball! score: 0-2, 0-1
4	"Baseball is Tiring"; Transliteration: "Yakyū shindoi" (Japanese: 野球シンドイ)	Kazuhisa Ōno	Natsuo Sōta	April 23, 2010
5	"I Want to Play Baseball"; Transliteration: "Yakyū yaritai" (Japanese: 野球やりたい)	Yasutaka Yamamoto	Yasutaka Yamamoto	April 30, 2010
Nishiura wins against Sakitama in a called game 8-0.
6	"Important"; Transliteration: "Daiji" (Japanese: 大事)	Tarō Iwasaki	Tsutomu Mizushima	May 7, 2010
Nishiura meets the baseball members of Sakitama in the train and are asked for practice games. Abe tells Mihashi to stop practicing his pitches since there will be consecutive games after their third game. The 'cheer girls' prepare their cheering outfits now that the team has won their second game. Nishiura arrives at the stadium, and sits in the bleachers.
7	"Gradual Changes"; Transliteration: "Yuruyaka na henka" (Japanese: ゆるやかな変化)	Natsuo Sōta	Natsuo Sōta	May 14, 2010
Nishiura's third game against Kounan starts. Bijou's coaches observe the game, and deduce that the catcher is deciding all of the pitches, and that Nishiura's pitcher has perfect control. Nishiura wins 6-3. Mihashi is approached by Abe's father, who asks him if he is scared of Abe. Mihashi says yes. Mihashi returns home, where his father is waiting. At home, Abe is questioned by his father about his relationship with Mihashi. Shimizu, a female reporter, finally gets the clear to cover Nishiura. Nishiura is about to start their next game with Bijou U Sayama.
8	"Round Five"; Transliteration: "5-Kaisen" (Japanese: 5回戦)	Yasutaka Yamamoto	Yōsuke Kuroda	May 21, 2010
Nishiura's game against Bijou U Sayama starts. Knowing that Abe carefully considers each player's pitch preferences, the opposing team quickly gains runs. Mihashi questions why the opposing team seems to only swing on pitches that seem to be the opposite of what they like, and Momoe and Abe realise that Bijou must have gathered a lot of data on Nishiura. Momoe notices that even the defense against them is skewed toward Nishiura's tendencies. Abe and Mihashi create a sign for a fake refusal of a sign to throw off Bijou. First inning (3-0), second inning (1-0).
9	"Researched"; Transliteration: "Kenkyū sareteru" (Japanese: 研究されてる)	Kazuhisa Ōno	Yōsuke Kuroda	May 28, 2010
Although Nishiura has discovered the extent of Bijou's planning against them, Abe decides to simulate ignorance to turn their information to Nishiura's advantage. Third inning (0-1). Suspicious, the senior captain that gave information about Nishiura to Bijou questions Bijou's coach Roka about Bijou's regular catcher's frequent glances at Roka, and decides to stay sitting next him to stop him from giving out signs from the benches and making the game unfair. Fourth inning (0-1). Although Bijou starts wondering if Nishiura has caught on to their strategy, they are not quite sure.
10	"Bottom of the Fifth, 5–2"; Transliteration: "5-kai ura, 2 tai 5" (Japanese: 5回裏, 2対5)	Tarō Iwasaki	Yōsuke Kuroda	June 4, 2010}
Momoe is infuriated to learn that Mihashi has never shaken off a pitch call from Abe, but decides not to scold Mihashi until after the game to preserve Mihashi's focus on the game. Takenouchi, Bijou's first pitcher, is replaced by Kashima as pitcher. Takenouchi replaces Kitamura as left fielder. Kashima's pitches are faster than Nishiura is used to by players and they have difficulty hitting. To avoid stepping on Kurata's arm in a successful dive toward home, Abe sprains his left knee. Tajima replaces Abe as catcher. Nishihiro plays left field and Mizutani plays third. Mihashi and the team resolves to do their best to make up for Abe's absence. Fifth inning (1–2), sixth inning (0-0), seventh inning (1-x)
11	"Because I'm the Ace"; Transliteration: "Ēsu dakara" (Japanese: エースだから)	Hiroyuki Hata	Yōsuke Kuroda	June 11, 2010
At the bottom of the seventh, the Tajima-Mihashi battery gives up two runs. Bijou figures out that Momoe is calling out strikes or balls. After Mihashi easily acquiesces to Abe's order to listen to Tajima's calls, Abe starts to feel guilty about Mihashi's absolute obedience to him and resolves to apologize after the game. Mihashi feels guilty that Abe is the only one to strategize and has to look after him. Eighth inning (0-1).
12	"Ninth Inning"; Transliteration: "9-Kai" (Japanese: 9回)	Tsutomu Mizushima	Yōsuke Kuroda	June 18, 2010
Mihashi goes past his 100th pitch. Momoe realizes Bijou has decoded Nishiura's signs. Momoe tells Tajima to decide pitches with Mihashi. After a three-run homer, Mihashi is badly shaken up and ends up giving up a walk to the next batter, unable to locate his pitches. Mihashi sees the importance of a pitcher's decision to follow the catcher's signs. Mihashi manages to strike-out the next batter, Kurata, the catcher, in that mindset. Bijou's Kashima is replaced by Takenouchi as pitcher. Moriya replaces Takenouchi in left field. Nishihiro, the reserve player, gets the last at-bat with two outs, but strikes out and the game ends with the ninth inning (4-1). Nishiura loses 11-6. Although they've lost, Momoe tells them to look forward to the Newcomers Tournament and the Fall Tournament.
12.5	"Goal"; Transliteration: "Mokuhyō" (Japanese: 目標)	Yasutaka Yamamoto	Yōsuke Kuroda	December 22, 2010 (DVD)
13	"Starting Again"; Transliteration: "Mata Hajimaru" (Japanese: また始まる)	Natsuo Sōta	Yōsuke Kuroda	June 25, 2010
The newcomers tournament begins in two weeks. Captain Hanai suggests the team set goals for themselves. Everyone desires to go to the Nationals, but the team lacks a consensus on how far they aim to go in the tournament. Only Mihashi and Tajima wrote winning the championship because the rest of the team lacked the resolve after losing their last game. Hanai asks Mihashi to explain what he wrote but Mihashi felt insecure about his reasoning, and says he did not give it much thought. Abe sends Mihashi a text after practice is over to reply immediately so they could talk. The manager admits to Mihashi that she saw his text, and suggests visiting Abe instead. Tajima and another teammate offer to go with Mihashi. Abe's little brother greets them, excited to recognize Tajima. Abe believes his knee will just barely recover in time for the newcomers tournament. Waiting for their food to arrive, Abe's little brother drags Tajima off to have him teach him some pointers. Abe apologizes to Mihashi when they are alone for getting injured and breaking his promise to catch all his games, and for telling him in the beginning to never shake off his signs. Mihashi tells Abe about his happiness at feeling like he was relied on by Tajima in his last game when he shook off a sign for the first time, because he felt as if he was being relied on. He asks Abe to rely on him as well, and Abe agrees. Mihashi smiles, which shocks Abe, who had not seen Mihashi smile yet. Mihashi hands over the practice notes to Abe, who is surprised at Mihashi's goal of "Nationals Champions." Abe states he will state the same goal. After they eat, Mihashi and Tajima leave. On the way back, Mihashi gets a text from Kanou stating Mihoshi lost their game. Mihashi is fired up, and firmly states to Tajima that he wants to accomplish a contest at the Nationals.

== See also ==
- List of Big Windup! chapters
