= List of Big Windup! chapters =

The chapters of the Japanese manga series Big Windup! are written and illustrated by Asa Higuchi. The series has been published in Kodansha's seinen manga magazine Monthly Afternoon since September 25, 2003. Kodansha has collected its chapters into individual tankōbon volumes, with the first volume released on March 23, 2004. As of June 23, 2025, 38 volumes have been released. The series follows Ren Mihashi, the previous ace pitcher in his middle school's baseball team, who suffers from low self-esteem due to a losing streak and transfers to a new high school. It is the first year that Nishiura high school has a baseball team, and they set a lofty goal of playing in the finals at legendary Hanshin Kōshien Stadium.

== Volumes ==
No.	Release date	ISBN
01	March 23, 2004	978-4-06-314342-3
1. "The True Ace" (ホントのエース, Honto no Ēsu); 2. "Catcher Duty" (キャッチャーの役割, Kyacchā no Yakuwari); 3. "Play!" (プレイ!!, Purei!!)
Ren Mihashi shows up for the first day of practice at the newly-formed baseball team for Nishiura High School, a small public school in Saitama. Here he meets Coach Momoe and other prospective players, including Yuuichirou Tajima (superstar 4-hole batter and 3rd baseman), Azusa Hanai (upstanding and insecure future captain), and Takaya Abe (catcher). Always believing that he was a no-good pitcher, Ren looks down on himself, but despite this, he continues to want to pitch. With the help of his new teammates, Ren starts his journey towards the ultimate goal for pitchers: becoming a "true ace". After the team spends a week in training camp, they face down their first opponent, and Ren is forced to confront the demons of his past, in the form of his former teammates, the freshman players at Mihoshi Academy in Gunma.
02	August 23, 2004	978-4-06-314353-9
4. "First Run" (先取点, Senshuten); 5. "Conditions for Being a Pitcher" (投手の条件, Tōshu no Jōken); 6. "An Amazing Pitcher?" (スゴイ投手?, Sugoi Tōshu?)
03	January 21, 2005	978-4-06-314368-3
7. "Amazing Pitcher, Part 1" (スゴイ投手・1, Sugoi Tōshu 1); 8. "Amazing Pitcher, Part 2" (スゴイ投手・2, Sugoi Tōshu 2); 9. "Steadily" (ちゃくちゃくと, Chakuchaku to); Bonus Chapter: "The Basic of Basics" (基本のキホン!, Kihon no Kihon!)
04	July 22, 2005	978-4-06-314384-3
10. "The End of Spring" (春が終わる, Haru ga Owaru); 11. "The Beginning of Summer" (夏がはじまる, Natsu ga Hajimaru)
05	November 22, 2005	978-4-06-314393-5
12. "Challenge!" (挑め!, Idome!)
06	March 23, 2006	978-4-06-314408-6
13. "One More Point!" (もう1点!, Mō 1-ten!)
07	January 23, 2007	978-4-06-314437-6
14. "Turnaround!" (逆転!, Gyakuten!)
08	May 23, 2007	978-4-06-314451-2
15. "The Conclusion!" (決着!, Kecchaku!); 16. "One Victory" (ひとつ勝って, Hitotsu Katte)
09	December 21, 2007	978-4-06-314482-6
17. "The Next Is?" (次は!?, Tsugi wa!?); 18. "The Third Round" [Part 1] (3回戦, 3-Kaisen)
10	May 23, 2008	978-4-06-314504-5
18. "The Third Round" [Part 2] (3回戦, 3-Kaisen)
11	October 23, 2008	978-4-06-314525-0
19. "Important" (大事, Daiji); 20. "Round Four" (4回戦, 4-Kaisen); 21. "Gradual Changes" (ゆるやかな変化, Yuruyakana Henka); 22. "Round Five" (5回戦, 5-Kaisen)
12	June 23, 2009	978-4-06-314570-0
23. "Round Five, Part 2" (5回戦 2, 5-Kaisen 2)
13	December 22, 2009	978-4-06-310605-3
24. "Round Five, Part 3" (5回戦 3, 5-Kaisen 3)
14	April 23, 2010	978-4-06-310666-4
25. "Round Five, Part 4" (5回戦 4, 5-Kaisen 4)
15	June 23, 2010	978-4-06-310670-1
26. Mata Hajimaru (また始まる); 27. Mokuhyō (目標); 28. Sodate! (育て!)
16	March 23, 2011	978-4-06-310735-7
29. Sodate! 2 (育て! 2); 30. Junjun Kesshō (準々決勝)
17	September 23, 2011	978-4-06-310776-0
31. Junjun Kesshō 2 (準々決勝 2); 32. Bikubiku to Iraira (ビクビクとイライラ); 33. Junkesshō (準決勝)
18	November 22, 2011	978-4-06-310785-2
34. Junkesshō 2 (準決勝 2)
19	June 22, 2012	978-4-06-387825-7
35. Junkesshō 3 (準決勝 3); 36. Furikabutte……? (振りかぶって……?); 37. Massugu! (まっすぐ!); 38. Kōshien (こうしえん)
20	October 23, 2012	978-4-06-387845-5
39. Gōdō Renshū (合同練習)
21	April 23, 2013	978-4-06-387881-3
40. Shū Dai Chūsenkai (秋大抽選会); 41. Shūki Chikudai 1-Kaisen (秋季・地区大1回戦)
22	November 22, 2013	978-4-06-387936-0
42. Shūki Chikudai 1-Kaisen 2 (秋季・地区大1回戦 2)
23	June 23, 2014	978-4-06-387976-6
43. Shūki Chikudai 1-Kaisen 3 (秋季・地区大1回戦 3); 44. Massugu (まっすぐ)
24	December 22, 2014	978-4-06-388020-5
45. Shūki Ken Taikai (秋季県大会)
25	August 21, 2015	978-4-06-388074-8
46. Shūki Ken Taikai 2 (秋季県大会 2)
26	December 22, 2015	978-4-06-388103-5
47. Shūki Ken Taikai 3 (秋季県大会 3)
27	July 22, 2016	978-4-06-388154-7
48. Shinten (進展); 49. Tajima no (田島の)
28	September 22, 2017	978-4-06-388287-2
50. Tajima no 2 (田島の 2); 51. Mentore (メントレ); 52. 4-Shi Taikai (4市大会)
29	March 23, 2018	978-4-06-511125-3
53. 4-Shi Taikai 2 (4市大会 2)
30	November 22, 2018	978-4-06-513408-5
54. 4-Shi Taikai 3 (4市大会 3)
31	July 23, 2019	978-4-06-516362-7
55. 4-Shi Taikai 4 (4市大会 4)
32	November 22, 2019	978-4-06-517510-1
56. 4-Shi Taikai 5 (4市大会 5); 57. Ranchi (ランチ)
33	July 20, 2020	978-4-06-520226-5
58. Shigeki (シゲキ); 59. Hajimari no Fuyu (はじまりの冬)
34	December 23, 2020	978-4-06-521647-7
60. Hajimari no Fuyu 2 (はじまりの冬 2)
35	July 21, 2021	978-4-06-524048-9
61. Kanagawa (神奈川)
36	December 22, 2022	978-4-06-527104-9
62. Haru ga Kuru (春が来る); 63. 150-Kiro (150キロ)
37	November 21, 2024	978-4-06-537301-9
64. Haru (春)
38	June 23, 2025	978-4-06-538955-3
65. Haru 2 (春 2); 66. 2-Nenme Sutāto! (2年目スタート!)

== See also ==
- List of Big Windup! episodes
