= Masaya Matsukaze =

Japanese actor

- 松風 雅也
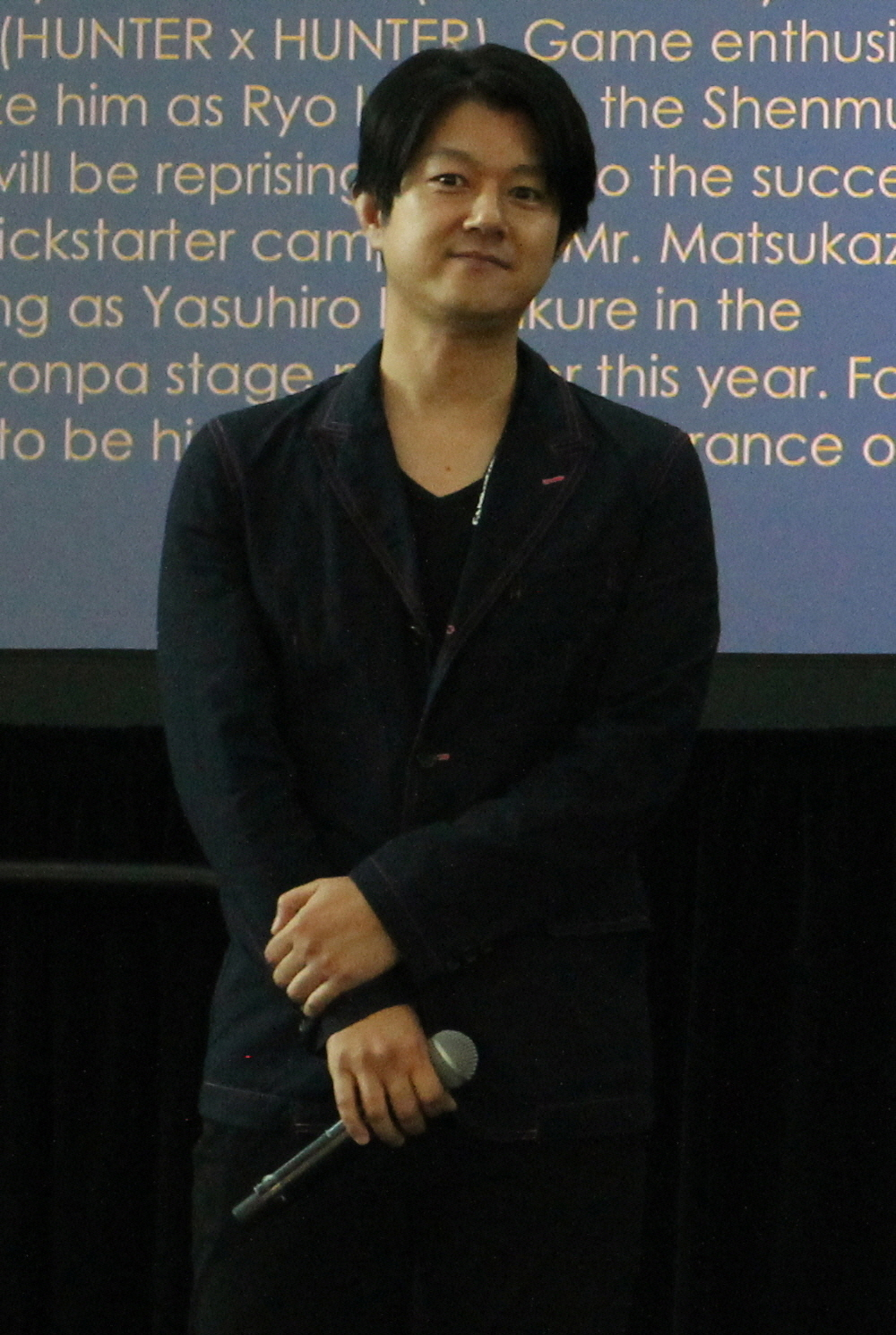
- Masaya Matsukaze in 2016
- Born: Masaya Watanabe; Fukushima Prefecture, Japan
- Occupations: Actor; voice actor
- Years active: 1997–present

Masaya Matsukaze (松風 雅也, Matsukaze Masaya; born Masaya Watanabe (渡邉 政也, Watanabe Masaya)) is a Japanese actor, voice actor and radio personality. He was formerly affiliated with Big Apple, Radix Mobanimation Multicye Division and Varoque Works, and is currently affiliated with Aoni Production. He was born in Fukushima Prefecture and is now living in Tokyo. He is best known for playing MegaBlue/Shun Namiki in Denji Sentai Megaranger and Ryo Hazuki in the Shenmue series.

== Filmography ==
=== TV animation ===
1999

- Sensual Phrase (Sakuya Ookochi)

2001

- Pokémon (Matsuba)
- Zoids: New Century Zero (Ballad Hunter)

2002

- Heat Guy J (Daisuke Aurora)

2003

- Dear Boys (Takumi Fujiwara)

2005

- Jigoku Shōjo (Ren Ichimoku)
- The Law of Ueki (Niko)

2006

- Ouran High School Host Club (Kyoya Ootori)
- Witchblade (Yuusuke Tozawa)

2007

- Death Note (Teru Mikami)
- Nodame Cantabile (Yasunori Kuroki)
- Ookiku Furikabutte (Motoki Haruna)
- Shion no Ō (Satoru Hani)

2008

- Blassreiter (Joseph Jobson)
- Darker than Black: Gemini of the Meteor (August 7)
- Gin Tama (Kyoujirou Nakamura)
- Nijū Mensō no Musume (Ken)
- One Outs (Takami Itsuki)
- Yu-Gi-Oh! 5D's (Divine)

2009

- Birdy the Mighty Decode 02 (Nataru Shinmyou)

2010

- Durarara!! (Morita)
- Fairy Tail (Ren Akatsuki)
- Reborn! (Kawahira)
- Seikon no Qwaser (Joshua Phrygianos)

2011

- Hunter × Hunter (TV 2011) (Gittarackur/Illumi Zoldyck)
- Kami-sama no Memo-chō (Tetsuo Ichinomiya "Tetsu")

2012

- Jormungand (Kasper Hekmatyar)
- Mōretsu Pirates (Kane McDougal)

2013

- Danganronpa: The Animation (Yasuhiro Hagakure)
- Beyond the Boundary (Miroku Fujima)

2014

- Pretty Guardian Sailor Moon Crystal (Zoisite)
- Shirobako (Shun Watanabe)

2015

- Durarara!! x2 Shou (Morita)
- Mobile Suit Gundam: Iron-Blooded Orphans (Gaelio Bauduin/Vidar)
- Samurai Warriors (Tōdō Takatora)

2016

- Cardfight!! Vanguard G NEXT (Kazumi Onimaru)
- The Disastrous Life of Saiki K. (Metori Saiko)
- Danganronpa 3: The End of Hope's Peak High School (Yasuhiro Hagakure)

2017

- ID-0 (Rick Ayer)
- Sword Oratoria (Dionysus)

2018

- Hakata Tonkotsu Ramens (Naoya Nitta)
- Hakumei and Mikochi (Iwashi (ep. 3, 5 - 6, ))
- A Certain Magical Index III (Teitoku Kakine)

2019

- One-Punch Man 2 (Suiryū)
- Stars Align (Ryōma Shinjō)

2020

- The Case Files of Jeweler Richard (Jeffrey Claremont)
- A Certain Scientific Railgun T (Teitoku Kakine)
- Darwin's Game (Game Master)
- King's Raid: Successors of the Will (Kyle)
- Attack on Titan: The Final Season (Colt Grice)

2021

- Shinkansen Henkei Robo Shinkalion Z (Valtom)
- Tokyo Revengers (Shinichiro Sano)
- Moriarty the Patriot (Baxter)

2022

- Shenmue (Ryo Hazuki)
- Love All Play (Shizuo Nakano)
- Shinobi no Ittoki (Genji Kajarishi)

2024

- Demon Lord 2099 (Marcus)
- Murai in Love (Yamakado)

2025

- The Red Ranger Becomes an Adventurer in Another World (Nagare Banjōji/Kizuna Blue)
- Fire Force 3rd Season (Furakuchu)
- Dealing with Mikadono Sisters Is a Breeze (Father of the Mikadono sisters)
- Sakamoto Days (Uda)

Unknown date

- Get Ride! Amdriver (Ragna Lawrelia)
- RockMan.EXE (Blues)
- RockMan.EXE AXESS (Blues/Dark Blues)
- RockMan.EXE Stream (Blues)
- RockMan.EXE Beast (Blues)
- RockMan.EXE Beast+ (Blues)
- Ginyū Mokushiroku Meine Liebe wieder (Nicholas)
- Shōnen Onmyōji (Taijō)
- Tactics (Raiko Minamoto)

=== Original video animation (OVA) ===
- Code Geass: Akito the Exiled (????) (Shin Hyuga Shaingu)
- Vie Durant (????) (Jei)

=== Theatrical animation ===
- RockMan.EXE: The Program of Light and Darkness (2005) (Blues)
- Shirobako: The Movie (2020) (Shun Watanabe)
- Gridman Universe (2023) (Vit)
- Whoever Steals This Book (2025) (Regular at the coffeehouse)

=== Video games ===
- Shenmue (1999) (Ryo Hazuki)
- Shenmue II (2001) (Ryo Hazuki)
- Get Ride! Amdriver (2004) (Ragna Lawrelia)
- Grandia III (2005) (Yuuki)
- 12Riven (2008) (Mei Kiridara)
- Tales of Hearts (2008) (Hisui Hearts)
- Danganronpa: Trigger Happy Havoc (2010) (Yasuhiro Hagakure)
- Desert Kingdom (2010) (Sharon)
- Z.H.P. Unlosing Ranger VS Darkdeath Evilman (2010) (Pirohiko Ichimonji)
- Renai Banchou 2 MidnightLesson!!! (2012) (Choi-Ero Banchou)
- Samurai Warriors: Chronicles 2nd (2012) (Takatora Tōdō)
- Desert Kingdom Portable (2013) (Sharon)
- Super Robot Wars UX (2013) (Jin Spencer)
- Samurai Warriors 4 (2014) (Takatora Tōdō)
- Until Dawn (2014) (Mike (Brett Dalton)) (Japanese dub)
- Project X Zone 2 (2015) (Ryo Hazuki)
- JoJo's Bizarre Adventure: Eyes of Heaven (2015) (Yotsuyu Yagiyama)
- Super Bomberman R (2017) (Yellow Bomberman)
- Danganronpa V3: Killing Harmony (2017) (Yasuhiro Hagakure)
- Zanki Zero (2018) (Mamoru Ichiyo (Child))
- Shenmue III (2019) (Ryo Hazuki)
- Sensual Phrase CLIMAX -Next Generation- (2019) (Sakuya Ookuchi)
- Ouran High School Host Club (????) (Kyoya Ootori)
- Granblue Fantasy (2019) (Cassius)
- Fate/Grand Order (2021) (Percival)
- Soul Hackers 2 (2022) (Saizo)
- One Piece Odyssey (2023) (Adio Suerte)
- Arknights: Endfield (2026) (Alesh)

=== Radio ===
- Maji Asa! (????) (DJ, with Yuko Nakazawa)

=== Dubbing ===
- Power Rangers in Space (1998): Zhane/Silver Ranger (Justin Nimmo) (Japanese dub)
- Fantastic Four (2008): Johnny Storm/Human Torch (Chris Evans) (NTV edition)

=== TV ===
- Oha Star (????) (Oha Star Bancho)
- Cinnamon (????) (Main MC)

=== TV Drama ===
- Denji Sentai Megaranger (1997-1998): Shun Namiki / Mega Blue
- Denji Sentai Megaranger vs Carranger (1997): Shun Namiki / Mega Blue
- Denji Sentai Megaranger Super Video: You Can Be One Too! A Mega Hero (1997): Shun Namiki
- Seijuu Sentai Gingaman vs Megaranger (1998): Shun Namiki / Mega Blue
- Godzilla vs. Megaguirus (2000)
- Hyakujuu Sentai Gaoranger vs. Super Sentai (2001): Shun Namiki / Mega Blue
- Ninpuu Sentai Hurricaneger (2002-2003): Katsuya Misaki (ep. 26)
- Jigoku Shōjo (2006): Tatsumi Sakaichi (ep. 7)
- Engine Sentai Go-onger: Boom Boom! Bang Bang! GekijōBang!! (2008): Gokumaru
- Engine Sentai Go-onger (2008-2009): Gokugokumaru (eps. 39 & 40)
- Samurai Sentai Shinkenger (2009-2010): Masataka Shiba / Shinken Red (eps. 11, 45)
- Zyuden Sentai Kyoryuger (2013-2014): Resentful Knight Endolf (eps. 25, 26, 27, 28, 29, 42, 43, 44, 45, 46, 47)

=== Musical ===
- Princess Knight (????) (Princess Franz)
