= Austin Tindle =

American voice actor

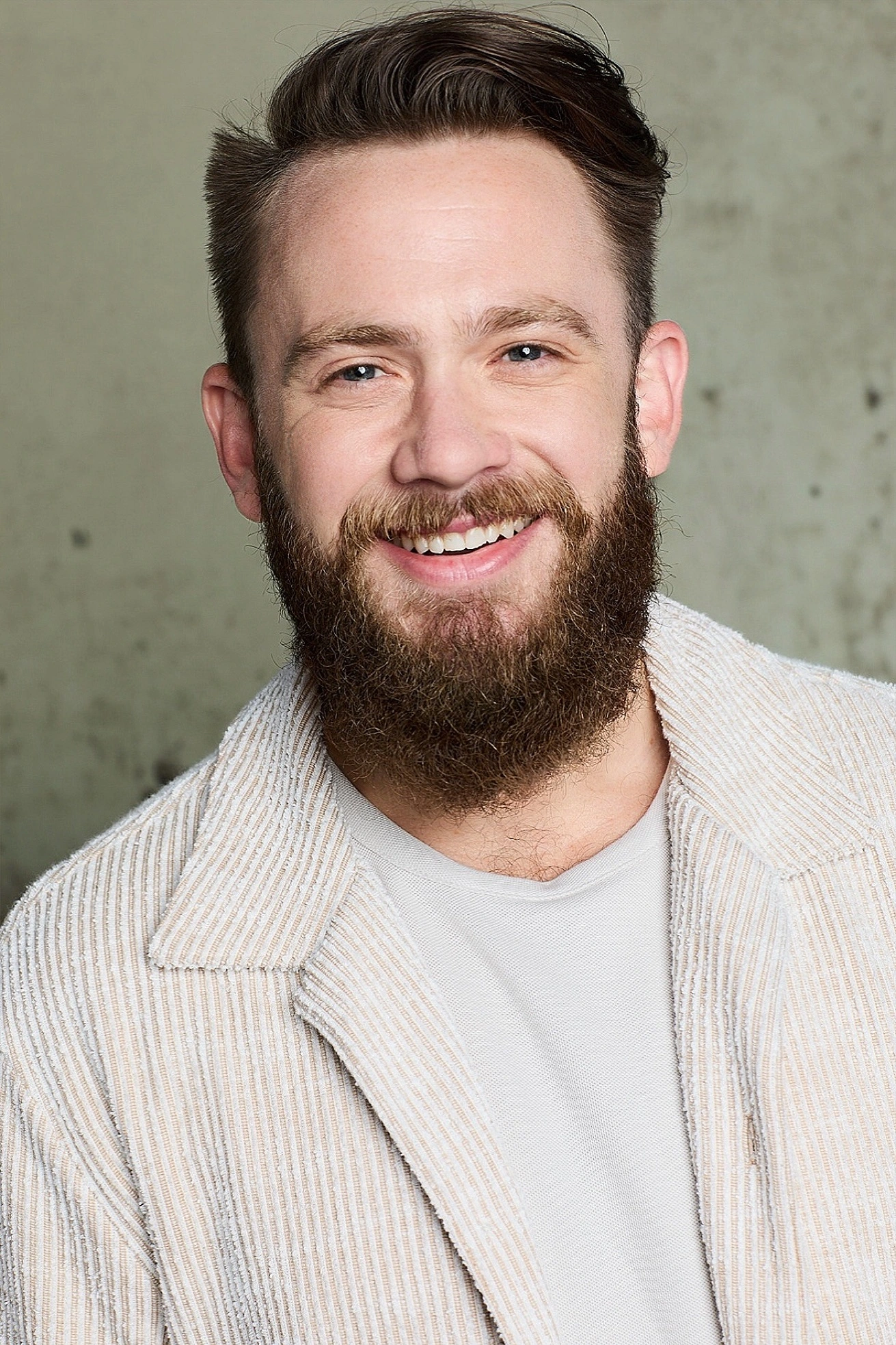
- Tindle in 2025
- Born: Orlando, Florida, U.S.
- Education: University of Texas at Dallas
- Occupation: Voice actor
- Years active: 2009–present

Austin Tindle is an American voice actor. He is best known for voicing the lead role of Ken Kaneki in the Tokyo Ghoul series, Yo Sato in Bento, Kiyoshi Fujino in Prison School, Ayumu Aikawa in Is This a Zombie?, Yu Ishigami in Kaguya-sama: Love Is War, Setsuna Sanzenkai in Island, Accelerator in the A Certain Magical Index series, as well as its spinoffs A Certain Scientific Accelerator and A Certain Scientific Railgun S, Karma Akabane in Assassination Classroom, Shu Ouma in Guilty Crown, Tsukasa Yugi in Toilet-Bound Hanako-kun, Vali Lucifer in High School DxD, Marco Bodt in Attack on Titan, Neito Monoma in My Hero Academia, Kenji Kazama in D-Frag!, Crowley Eusford in Seraph of the End, Leopold Vermillion in Black Clover and Yoshio Kobayashi in Trickster, and Haruka Sakura in Wind Breaker.

== English dubbing roles ==
=== Anime ===
Year	Title	Role	Notes	Source
2009	Sgt. Frog	Charlie Viper		
2011–2019	Fairy Tail	Alzack Connell		
2012	Deadman Wonderland	Wakabayashi		
2012	Fractale	Gowan		
2012	Is This a Zombie? series	Ayumu Aikawa	Also Season 2	
2012	Shangrila	Kunihito Kusanagi		
2012	A Certain Magical Index	Accelerator		
2013	Guilty Crown	Shu Ouma		
2013	We Without Wings	Kazuma Morisato		
2014	A Certain Magical Index II	Accelerator		
2014	A Certain Scientific Railgun S	Accelerator		
2014	High School DxD	Vali Lucifer		
2014	Cross Ange	Tusk		
2014	Hetalia: The Beautiful World	Seborga		
2014	Attack on Titan	Marco Bott		
2015	Bento	Yo Sato		
2015	D-Frag	Kenji Kazama		
2015	Danganronpa: The Animation	Kiyotaka Ishimaru		
2015	Freezing	Louis el Bridget	Season 2	
2015	Kamisama Kiss	Monjiro	Season 2	
2015	Maria the Virgin Witch	Joseph		
2015	Tokyo Ghoul series	Ken Kaneki/Haise Sasaki	Also Season 2 and :re	
2015	Tokyo Ravens	Doman Ashiya		
2015	Prison School	Kiyoshi Fujino		
2015	Seraph of the End	Crowley Eusford	Also Season 2	
2015–2016	Assassination Classroom	Karma Akabane	Also Koro Sensei Quest	
2016	Snow White with the Red Hair	Obi	Also Season 2	
2016	91 Days	Angelo Lagusa (Avilio Bruno)		
2016	Alderamin on the Sky	Torway Remeon		
2016	Norin	Kosaku Hata		
2016	Prince of Stride: Alternative	Riku Yagami		
2016	Tales of Zestiria the X	Lunarre		
2016	The Vision of Escaflowne	Susumu Amano	Funimation dub	
2016	First Love Monster	Tomu Kaneko		
2016	Gonna be the Twintail	Soji Mitsuka (male)		
2016	Grimgar of Fantasy and Ash	Michiki		
2016	Trickster	Yoshio Kobayashi		
2016	My Love Story!!	Makoto Sunakawa		
2017	Saga of Tanya the Evil	Kurst von Walhorf		
2017	Akashic Records of Bastard Magic Instructor	Albert Frazer		
2017	Tsuki ga Kirei	Sho Nagahara		
2017–2025	My Hero Academia	Neito Monoma	Season 2 onwards	
2017	Love Tyrant	Seiji Aino		
2017	ACCA: 13-Territory Inspection Dept.	Jean Otus		
2017–2018	The Ancient Magus' Bride	Ruth		
2018	A Certain Magical Index III	Accelerator		
2018	Zombie Land Saga	Male Cop 1A		
2018	Darling in the Franxx	Goro		
2018	Island	Setsuna Sanzenkai		
2018–2019	Free! -Dive to the Future-	Rin Matsuoka, Male Shimogami Swimmer 6A	ep. 0, 6	
2018–present	That Time I Got Reincarnated as a Slime	Gabiru	Also film & specials	
2019	A Certain Scientific Accelerator	Accelerator		
2019	My Roommate Is a Cat	Subaru Mikazuki		
2019	Dragon Ball Super	Dyrasem, Sour		
2019	Why the Hell are You Here, Teacher!?	Ichiro Sato		
2019	Domestic Girlfriend	Natsuo Fujii		
2019	Stars Align	Arashi Oji		
2020	A Certain Scientific Railgun T	Accelerator		
2020	Plunderer	Pele Poporo		
2020	Toilet-Bound Hanako-kun	Tsukasa Yugi		
2020–2021	The Gymnastics Samurai	Tetsuo Minamino		
2020–2022	Kaguya-sama: Love Is War	Yu Ishigami		
2021	The Prince of Tennis II: Hyotei vs. Rikkai Game of Future	Akaya Kirihara		
2021	Magatsu Wahrheit Zuerst	Damian		
2021	The Detective Is Already Dead	Kimihiko Kimizuka	ADR director	
2021	Banished from the Hero's Party	Campbell		
2022	Shenmue	Ryo Hazuki		
2022	The Prince of Tennis	Akaya Kirihara		
2023	Buddy Daddies	Kyutaro		
2023	Trigun Stampede	Knives		
2023	The Ice Guy and His Cool Female Colleague	Saejima		
2023	KamiKatsu	Yukito		
2023	A Returner's Magic Should Be Special	Desir		
2024	Spice and Wolf: Merchant Meets the Wise Wolf	Yarei		
2024	Fairy Tail: 100 Years Quest	Alzack Connell		
2024	Nina the Starry Bride	Sett		
2024	Oshi no Ko	Hikaru Kamiki	Season 2 onwards	
2024–2025	Wind Breaker	Haruka Sakura		
2025	Tying the Knot with an Amagami Sister	Cat		
2025	Medaka Kuroiwa Is Impervious to My Charms	Medaka		
2025	Reborn as a Vending Machine, I Now Wander the Dungeon	Boxxo	Season 2	
2025	My Status as an Assassin Obviously Exceeds the Hero's	Akira		
2026	Daemons of the Shadow Realm	Asuma Kagemori		

=== Films ===
Year	Title	Role	Notes	Source
2012	Fafner - Heaven and Earth	Kenji Kondo		
2016	The Boy and the Beast	Ichirohiko		
2017	Tokyo Ghoul	Ken Kaneki	Live-action English Dub	
2019	Dragon Ball Super: Broly	Leek		
2019	Human Lost	Yozo Oba		

=== Video games ===
Year	Title	Role	Notes	Source
2015	Smite	Hou Yi		
2015	Dragon Ball Xenoverse	Raspberry		
2016	Dragon Ball Xenoverse 2	Raspberry		
2019	Borderlands 3	Male Looter		

== Awards and nominations ==
Year	Award	Category	Work/Recipient	Result	Ref.
2024	8th Crunchyroll Anime Awards	Best Voice Artist Performance (English)	Millions Knives (Trigun Stampede)	Nominated	
