= Ryo Hazuki =

- Shenmue character
- Concept artwork for Ryo Hazuki by Kenji Miyawaki
- First game: Shenmue (1999)
- Created by: Yu Suzuki
- Designed by: Kenji Miyawaki
- Voiced by: Masaya Matsukaze (Japanese); Corey Marshall (English, games); Austin Tindle (English, anime)
- Motion capture: Masaya Matsukaze

Ryo Hazuki (Japanese: 芭月 涼, Hepburn: Hazuki Ryō) is the protagonist of the Sega video game series Shenmue. Throughout the story, Ryo travels through 1980s Japan and China in pursuit of his father's killer. Across the first trilogy, Ryo obtains allies who help him in his quest. He has also appeared in other games as well as the animated adaptation of the first two games.

Ryo was created by Yu Suzuki following an attempt to create a Virtua Fighter spin-off game starring Akira Yuki until he decided to create an entirely new IP, Shenmue. However, Ryo uses the same martial arts employed by Akira. In the Japanese version, Ryo is voiced by Masaya Matsukaze, who also recorded his motion capture. In the English version, he is voiced by Corey Marshall.

Critical response to Ryo was mixed. His quest to find the people who murdered his father was praised for its innovative feel and his fighting style was praised. However, Ryo's characterization was often the subject of negative response for being too stereotypical.

== Creation ==
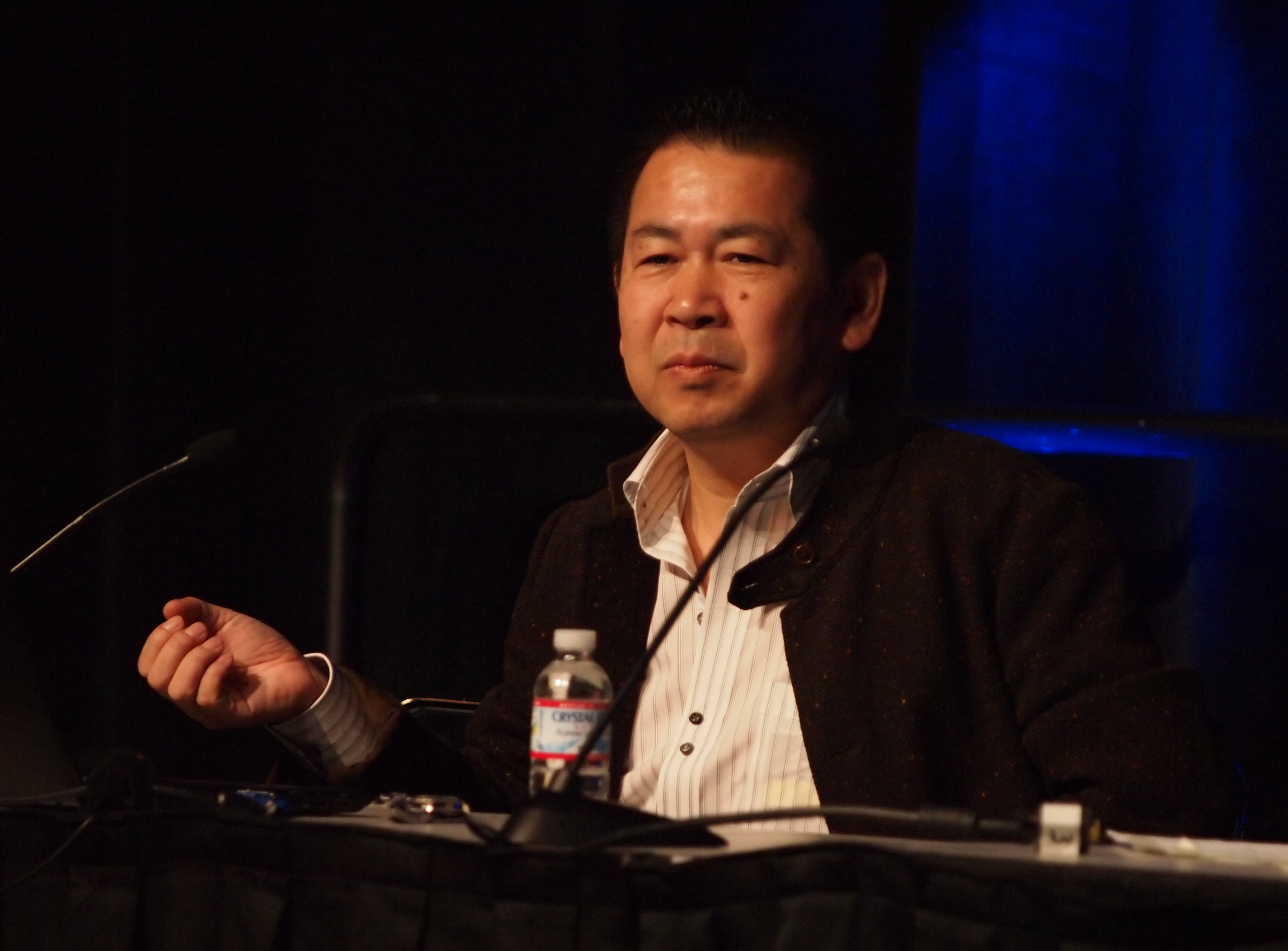
Yu Suzuki, the creator of Ryo Hazuki

In 1996, AM2 began developing a 3D Saturn RPG with the working title Guppy. This became a Virtua Fighter spin-off title Virtua Fighter RPG: Akira's Story, a role-playing game starring main character Akira Yuki. AM2 planned a "cinematic" approach, including voice acting and elaborate combat sequences. Suzuki researched locations in China, and constructed four acts with the themes "sadness", "fight", [sic] "departure" and "starting afresh". In this version of the story, Akira would overcome his grief following his father's death, travel to China, defeat an antagonist, and begin a journey with a new friend. Suzuki recruited a screenwriter, a playwright, and film directors to write the multi-part story. In 1997, development moved to Sega's then upcoming console, the Dreamcast, and the Virtua Fighter connection was dropped in favor of the new IP Shenmue with a new lead.

Planner Eigo Kasahara came up with Ryo's name as well as the ship's name 'Genpuumaru' which the protagonist uses in the end of the first game. Kasahara also considered "Ryo Kamizaki" in the making of the game when interacting with Suzuki. The protagonist's house was based on a real house meant to look like a 500-year old temple. Originally, Ryo could unleash a move similar to the Shin Shoryuken (真 · 昇 龍拳; lit. "True Rising Dragon Fist") used by fighting game character Ryu from Street Fighter. A gamer who claimed to have been involved in the development of the original Shenmue revealed that Ryo could perform it in the first game. However, the requirement for this cheat was to input it within three frames which was impossible using legitimate means. According to the gamer, the input time was set just long enough for input during development, but producer Yu Suzuki put a stop to it and the trick never made it into the final version.

=== Characterization and design ===
While designing his personality, Suzuki wanted him to give him a strong sense of justice similar to that of a samurai. Yu Suzuki said Ryo was defined by his liking of martial arts which he shares in common with other characters. Ryo was always meant to be portrayed as an immature character in his initial appearances as he was more obsessed with developing his martial arts rather than his own education. While initially considered a blank canvas, Ryo's arc appears during Shenmue II when meeting the heroine Shenhua. His growth was also reflected on his body and gave the player a more notable approach when playing the game. He brought parallels with Kazuma Kiryu and Haruka Sawamura from the action series Yakuza who also age across their games. However, Suzuki felt that showing Ryo's childhood would be difficult as a result of the need of showing his child persona model.

Ryo's design was made by Kenji Miyawaki. Originally, his idea for the character was that of a young man wearing jeans and a white jacket following the request for a role-playing game protagonist. However, the staff found it too plain and wanted to avoid him look cool for the time the game was being made. A leather jacket was created after giving more time into consideration. The staff approved it even Miyawaki did not find it appealing and common attire.

For Shenmue III, there was not a major change in Ryo's personality since it starts shortly after Shenmue II. His interactions with Shenhua offer a major contrast between their different growths. Suzuki tried portraying Ryo more realistically by giving him the option of interacting with friends or recovering his health by consuming meals. There was also a major focus about how Ryo can train to become stronger in gameplay fashion by taking medications despite sharing the same moves from previous games. Suzuki expressed his discomfort with Ryo's 3D model as he wanted it to improve it since the early development of the game. While the story of Shenmue starts with a revenge quest, Suzuki did not specify how the narrative would end.

=== Casting ===
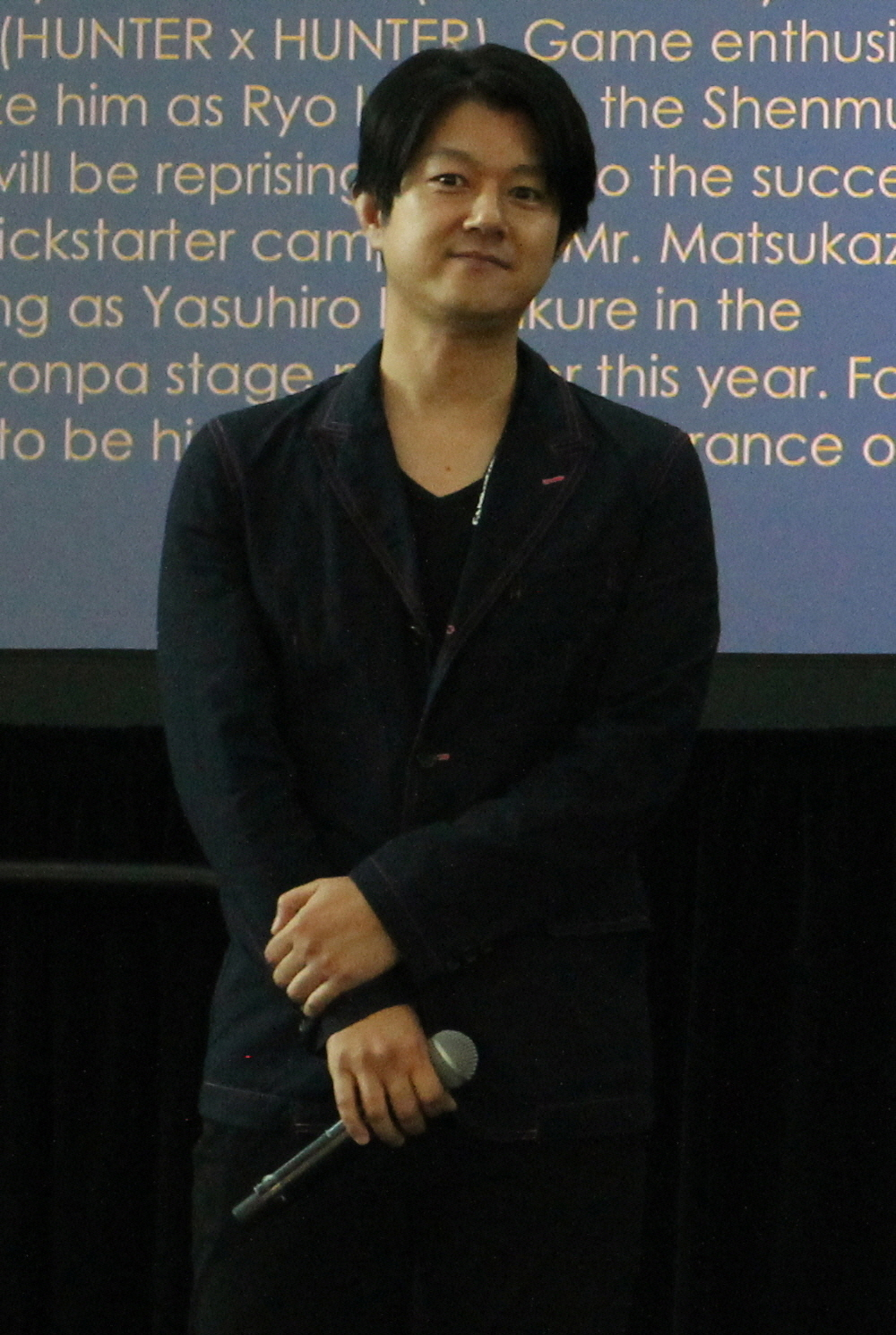
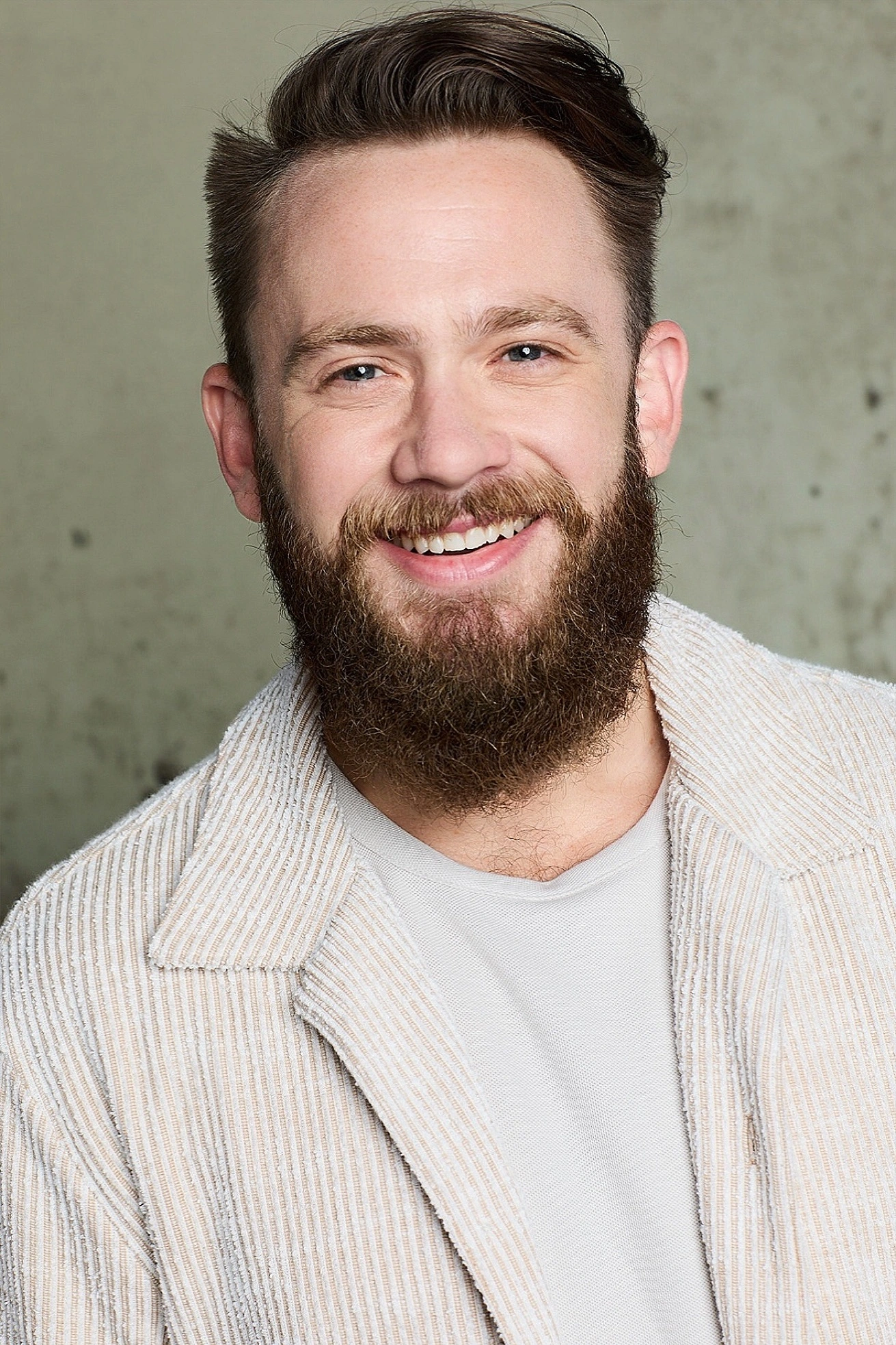
Masaya Matsukaze (left) and Austin Tindle voiced Ryo in Japanese and English, respectively.

All games in the Shenmue trilogy were made with motion capture artists who also voiced the characters. In Japanese, Ryo is voiced by Masaya Matsukaze, known for working in the tokusatsu series Denji Sentai Megaranger. Matsukaze was a rookie voice actor when he started working on Shenmue.

For the following games, Matsukaze received mixed reviews for his take on Ryo in the anime, leading him to believe fans have their own views of the protagonist especially since it had been decades since his last take. He tried using a higher pitch to make Ryo sound cool, which he found difficult due to his age. Matsukaze was glad he reprised his role in Shenmue III after several years which also started by the time he was contacted about the anime adaptation. Suzuki praised Matsukaze's work in the anime for still fitting the character.

In all the US games, Ryo was voiced by Corey Marshall whom Suzuki approved. He wanted Ryo to be given a more "wild" tone in Shenmue III. Marshall recalls being in college in New York and saw an ad to which he responded. He was then sent to Japan to record the dub. While Ryo has appeared in other spin-off games, Marshall did not work on them and instead the game staff members used voice clips.

For the anime adaptation of the game, Austin Tindle voiced Ryo in the English dub. According to Brittany Vincent from IGN, Tindle offered a "much more fluid, laid back version of the character" when compared to Marshall's original Ryo.

== Story ==
Ryo debuts as the playable character in the 1999 action adventure game Shenmue. The teenage martial artist of family dojo, Ryo Hazuki witnesses a confrontation between his father, Iwao, and a Chinese man, Lan Di. Lan Di demands Iwao give him a mysterious stone artifact, the dragon mirror. When he threatens to kill Ryo, Iwao tells him the mirror is buried under the cherry blossom tree outside. As Lan Di's men dig up the mirror, Lan Di mentions Zhao Sunming, whom Iwao allegedly killed in Mengcun, China. Lan Di delivers a finishing blow and Iwao dies in Ryo's arms. Ryo's investigation leads him to Master Chen in the Yokosuka harbor. Through Chen and his son Guizhang, Ryo learns that the dragon mirror taken by Lan Di is one of two mirrors. He locates the second, the phoenix mirror, in a basement hidden beneath his father's dojo. He defeats a local gang connected to Lan Di's organization, and Master Chen asks him to seek the aid of Master Xiuying in Hong Kong. Ryo boards a boat to China.

In Shenmue II, Ryo finds Master Xiuying Hong, but she refuses to help him, considering his quest for vengeance reckless. He discovers a certain Yuanda Zhu had sent Ryo's father, Iwao, a letter warning him of Lan Di's intentions. Ryo teams up with a gang leader, Wuying Ren; a free-spirited motorcyclist, Joy; and a street boy, Wong, to find Yuanda Zhu. Ryo and his allies locate Zhu in Kowloon Walled City, but are ambushed by the criminal Yellow Head organization. Zhu is kidnapped. Ryo rescues Zhu as Lan Di departs by helicopter. Zhu reveals that Lan Di killed Ryo's father because he believes Iwao killed his own father. Zhu also reveals that the mirrors will lead to the resurrection of the Qing Dynasty, the last imperial dynasty of China. Zhu advises Ryo to continue his search in the village of Bailu in Guilin, where Lan Di is also heading. There, Ryo meets a teenage girl, Shenhua Ling, whose family is connected to the legacy of the dragon and phoenix mirrors. She leads Ryo to a stone quarry on the village outskirts to meet her father, but discovers he is missing.

In Shenmue III, Ryo learns that Lan Di's father, Zhao Sunming, once visited Bailu with Ryo's father to train under the local grandmaster. Zhao died under mysterious circumstances several years later. Ryo also discovers that the phoenix and dragon mirrors were created by Shenhua's great-grandfather at the request of the Chinese emperor. Ryo and Shenhua learn that Shenhua's father, Yuan, has been kidnapped by a local gang looking for the phoenix mirror. Ryo defeats two of the thugs, but is defeated by their boss, Yanlang. He convinces Sun, a local martial arts master, to teach him a powerful Bajiquan move, and uses it to defeat Yanlang. A village elder helps them discover a map to the treasure connected to the mirrors. Ryo fends off an attack from Chai, who reveals that Yuan and Xu have been taken to the city of Niaowu. In Niaowu, Ryo and Shenhua learn that a local gang, the Red Snakes, is holding Yuan and Xu hostage. Shenhua is tricked by a Chi You Men leader, Niao Sun. Ryo and his allies infiltrate the Chi You Men's castle and rescue Shenhua and her father. Ryo confronts Lan Di, but Lan Di easily defeats him. Niao Sun betrays Lan Di and has her men burn the castle. Ryo, Ren and Shenhua continue their journey along the Great Wall of China.

Shenmue: The Animation, an anime adaptation, adapts Ryo's role in the first two games. Ryo has made playable appearances in other Sega video games, including Sonic & Sega All-Stars Racing (2010), Sonic & All-Stars Racing Transformed (2012), Project X Zone 2 (2015), and Sega Heroes (2018).

== Reception ==
Ryo Hazuki received mixed critical response. Akira Yuki's parallels with Ryo, such as a revenge quest and similar techniques, were brought up by Thomas Bowen of Game Rant. In retrospect, Metro.co.uk believed the idea of Akira being an RPG protagonist might have been too boring so it instead saw the creation of Ryo Hazuki to be more interesting in the form of Shenmue. Ryo was also criticized by Vice which considered him an inferior character when compared to Kazuma Kiryu from Yakuza for coming across as a "stereotypical 'good guy' of the sort we've in countless mainstream movies and games" but is less acceptable than Kiryu despite sharing similar acceptable ambitions. As a result, the writer called Ryo a "character tool" as he considered Kiryu more realistic. KillScreen was more negative, finding Ryo more cartonish as a result of his unrealistic personality for a young man whose father is killed in the first minutes of the first game. The character's interactions with non-playable characters were also criticized for coming across as random and weird. Inverse said Ryo's lack of knowledge about his father's killers feel like a plot device to explore the open world and helps to appeal to the gamer. They noted Ryo's personality is more defined by his martial arts sequences. Andy Kelly of TheGamer was amazed by Ryo's story in the first Shenmue game appreciating how the player explores a realistic style and encounters several enemies in the narrative but still criticized his interactions with non-playable characters for its monotone style. GamesRadar enjoyed Ryo's story for its mix of fight scenes similar to Virtua Fighter. He felt Ryo feels like a realistic young man considering the way he is treated and how the voice acting comes across as accidentally hilarious sometimes. The Guardian lamented the slow pacing of the series as Ryo makes little progress in his quest in each game to defeat Lan Di, highly contrasting the developments of fighting game characters like Ryu from Street Fighter, while also noting lack of development he has with love interests.

For Shenmue III, VG2457 said people waited years to see if Ryo manages to complete his revenge quest that started in the first game. RPGSite criticized Yuzuki's decision to end Shenmue III on another cliffhanger to Ryo's story with also a negative focus on the protagonist's dialogue which was labeled as "dull" and "unambitious". Screen Rant expressed similar feelings but expressed fans would either be happy or sad that Ryo's story does not end with Shenmue III especially after so many years. CheckPointGaming was more positive to seeing Ryo's return as his interactions with Shenhua looked appealing. The character's martial arts were also praised. Destructoid criticized Ryo's relationship with Shenhua for coming across as "whole macho "Uhhh… I'll be fine" gimmick" but still appreciated the hero had side attractions to explore rather than just fighting sequences.

In "Promoting Yokosuka through videogame tourism", Dale Leorke and Carlos Ramirez Moreno wrote that Shenmue is story of both revenge and mourning through Ryo's point of view which used the open world of Yokosuka to help the player immerse into the story and relate to the main character. Sega also used this game to help promote tourism in Japan. In the book "Video Games between Postcolonialism and Postcommunism", the Ryo from Shenmue II is analyzed as a man who sees changes in his identity and his world as a result of moving to China during neocolonial global development. In the book Game Invaders: The Theory and Understanding of Computer Games, the author says the player distances himself from Ryo as the protagonist has a self-defined personality the player cannot predict in a similar fashion to other fictional icons like Lara Croft or Luke Skywalker even if the game developers try hard to immerse the players with the character.

A figurine of Ryo was made by First4Figures. Dead or Alive 5 director Yosuke Hayashi wanted to include Ryo as a guest character in his fighting game. A replica of Ryo's jacket, and the original jacket worn by Japanese Ryo Hazuki voice actor Masahiro Yoshimoto was also produced. The jacket costs $10,000. In 2012, Steve Lycett, executive producer of Sumo Digital, encouraged a fan-made poll on the SEGA Forums to determine which three SEGA characters the fans would like to see in Sonic & All-Stars Racing Transformed as Downloadable Content. Out of the 28 Sega characters chosen by the forum, Ryo received the majority vote ranking 1st, while Hatsune Miku ranked 2nd, and Segata Sanshiro ranked 3rd.

Despite noting the similarities the focus on a modern story Retro Gamer says Ryo would retain many of Akira's distinct looks. Retro Gamer referred to Ryo as an atypical RPG leader due to his quiet demeanor and his tendency to be alone. Though this was noted to be criticized by gamers, this personality stands up as clever ot-integral. Ryo's kindness are further exposed when interacting with support characters despite coming of as subtle. Despite his traditional relationship with his father, Ryo's looks are noted to be Western influenced rather than his father's. However, the writers found Ryo's journey to be overly long as a result of Suzuki's notes about the length of Shenmue.
