= Shenmue: The Animation =

Japanese anime television series

- Promotional poster
- Created by: Yu Suzuki (Ys Net, concept); Sega (story)
- Screenplay by: Kento Shimoyama
- Directed by: Chikara Sakurai
- Music by: Kana Shibue
- Country of origin: Japan
- Original language: Japanese
- No. of episodes: 13

Production
- Producer: Joseph Chou
- Animator: Telecom Animation Film Co., Ltd.
- Production companies: Sega Corporation; TMS Entertainment Co., Ltd.

Original release
- Network: Tokyo MX, BS NTV
- Release: February 6 – May 1, 2022

Shenmue: The Animation, also known simply as Shenmue, is a Japanese anime television series based on the Shenmue video game series by Yu Suzuki and published by Sega. A co-production between Crunchyroll and Adult Swim, the series aired from February to May 2022. A Japanese streaming release followed in April 2022. Shortly after its streaming debut in Japan, it was decided that a televised broadcast of the series would commence a month later on Tokyo MX. The anime series adapts the storyline of Shenmue (1999) and Shenmue II (2001).

== Plot ==
In 1986, Ryo Hazuki witnesses his father being murdered by the mysterious Lan Di. Seeking vengeance, Ryo begins an investigation into Lan Di, including his connections to the criminal underworld and a mystical pair of mirrors. Traveling from his home in Yokosuka to Hong Kong, Ryo finds new allies to help train his martial arts, hoping to use his newfound skills to bring an end to his father's killer once and for all.

== Characters ==
Ryo Hazuki (芭月涼, Hazuki Ryō)
Voiced by: Masaya Matsukaze, Natsumi Wakasa (young) (Japanese); Austin Tindle (English)
An 18-year-old Japanese teenager who goes on a journey to avenge his father.
Lan Di (藍帝, Rantei)
Voiced by: Takahiro Sakurai (Japanese); Scott Gibbs (English)
A high-ranking member of the Chi You Men.
Shenhua (シェンファ, Shenfa)
Voiced by: Haruka Terui (Japanese); Natalie Rial (English)
A mysterious teenager who becomes Ryo's traveling companion.
Nozomi Harasaki (原崎 望, Harasaki Nozomi)
Voiced by: Haruka Fushimi (Japanese); Cat Thomas (English)
Ryo's close friend.
Guizhang Chen (陳 貴章, Chin Kishō)
Voiced by: Ryuichi Kijima (Japanese); Jeremy Gee (English)
Master Chen's son.
Chai (チャイ)
Voiced by: Yoshimitsu Shimoyama (Japanese); Greg Ayres (English)
A low-ranking member of the Chi You Men.
Wong (ウォン, Won)
Voiced by: Shota Hayama (Japanese); Bryson Baugus (English)
The youngest member of Wuying Ren's gang, the Heavens.
Joy (ジョイ, Joi)
Voiced by: M.A.O (Japanese); Luci Christian (English)
A young Chinese woman who can most often be seen around Aberdeen.
Xiuying Hong / Lishao Tao
Voiced by: Mirei Kumagai (Japanese); Christine Auten (English)
A Tai Chi martial artist and master of the Man Mo Temple.
Ren Wuying (レン・ウーイン, Ren Ūin)
Voiced by: Osamu Taira (Japanese); Cody House (English)
The leader of the notorious gang, the Heavens.
Dou Niu (斗牛, Togyū)
Voiced by: Takahiro Sumi (Japanese); Joe Daniels (English)
The leader of the Yellow Heads.

== Production and release ==
The anime was announced in September 2020 at the virtual Crunchyroll Expo. The series was directed by Chikara Sakurai, most notable for directing the second season of the One-Punch Man anime television series. Shenmue creator Yu Suzuki served as an executive producer for its anime adaptation. Kento Shimoyama wrote the series' scripts, Kensuke Ishikawa designed the characters, and Kana Shibue composed the music. The series was animated by Telecom Animation Film with production management by Sola Entertainment. The opening theme song is "Undead-Noid" performed by Kashitarō Itō, while the ending theme song is "Sympathy" performed by Narudora. The series consists of 13 episodes and aired on Adult Swim's Toonami programming block and streamed on Crunchyroll from February 6 to May 1, 2022. The English dub of the series, as well as the English subtitled version, was produced by Sentai Studios. The series premiered on multiple streaming services in Japan on April 7, 2022. Shortly after its streaming launch in the country, it was announced that Tokyo MX would begin broadcasting the series a month later starting on May 3, 2022.

According to the producer Yuu Kiyozono, the anime was in development for around two to three years during the time Shenmue III was produced and released. Kiyozono said that the production crew went to Yokosuka to get an accurate feel of the city's streets and atmosphere. Most of the core Japanese voice actors returned from the video games, although some of the cast included new voice actors to appeal to the game's younger fanbase.

Producer Joseph Chou stated that Suzuki was heavily involved in the production to plan out the narrative with backstory information that was never implemented in the games. Sakurai added that some free roaming aspects were included with Ryo talking to people in the streets. On October 8, 2021, Shenmue's first official trailer was revealed at New York Comic Con.

On September 28, 2022, Jason DeMarco, the senior vice president of action and anime programming for Warner Bros. Discovery, confirmed that the series would not be renewed for a second season after it was removed from Adult Swim's website.

== Episodes ==
No.	Title	Directed by (Note: Production staff information is taken from the ending credits of each episode)	Storyboarded by	Chief animation directed by	English air date (Note: Adult Swim listed the series premiere as airing on February 5, 2022, at 12:30 a.m. (24:30) EST/PST, which is effectively February 6. The English sub launched simultaneously on Crunchyroll.)	Japanese air date
1	"Thunderclap"; Transliteration: "Kamitoke" (Japanese: 霹靂(かみとけ))	Chikara Sakurai	Chikara Sakurai	Kensuke Ishikawa	February 6, 2022	May 3, 2022
In November 1986 in Yokosuka, Ryo Hazuki is the only legitimate heir of the Hazuki dojo. After helping his school win the prefectural karate tournament, he returns home to discover a mysterious man by the name Lan Di. Demanding to know the location of a mirror, Ryo's father, Iwao, gives it up. Once it is retrieved, Lan Di asks Iwao if he remembers the name Sunming Zhao. Following a one-sided battle, Iwao gives Ryo his final words before dying. Some days later, Ryo contemplates pursuing Lan Di in hopes of uncovering the truth. After going out for some ramen with his friend Nozomi Harasaki, a man overhears them talking about Lan Di and insinuates the latter may have ties with the Chinese mafia. Ryo returns home wondering about his father's involvement. While entering the dojo, Ryo is attacked by another man, who demands the location of a second mirror. After Ryo manages to dodge his attacks and counter, the man flees. Ryo proclaims to his friend Masayuki "Fuku" Fukuhara and housekeeper Ine that he will uncover his father's past and why he was murdered.
2	"Daybreak"; Transliteration: "Kawatare" (Japanese: 彼誰(かはたれ))	Keiko Oyamada	Yūichirō Yano	Kumiko Horikoshi	February 13, 2022	May 10, 2022
Ryo receives a letter addressed to his father that was sent by a man known as Yuanda Zhu. When Ryo later visits the Heartbeats Bar in Dobuita, he gets in a scuffle. After Ryo promises that he will never return in exchange for information regarding the Chinese mafia, the barkeep informs him that he should seek out a man known as Charlie. Ryo finds Charlie and his men, but they attack him and Charlie runs away. Later regrouping, Charlie and his men are convinced Ryo was sent by another gang called the Chen. The next day, Ryo is approached by two men who take him to a construction site. There, Charlie and his men attempt to ambush Ryo but he counters them. After discovering Ryo has no connections with the Chen, Charlie reveals that the man he is targeting is dangerous foe even among mafia members. Shigeo Yamagishi, Iwao's old friend, goes to the park after accidentally eavesdropping on Ryo's conversation with Charlie. Once they meet, Shigeo advises Ryo to visit a pottery shop in town where its owner can read the contents of his letter. Before leaving, Shigeo teaches Ryo several forms of martial arts.
3	"Yin-Yang"; Transliteration: "On'yō" (Japanese: 陰陽(おんよう))	Ōri Yasukawa & Nobuo Tomizawa	Nobuo Tomizawa	Kensuke Ishikawa, Youichi Takada & Koichi Suenaga	February 20, 2022	May 17, 2022
Thanks to the pottery shop owner, Ryo finally deciphers the letter. After calling Master Chen, he is secretly taken to a warehouse. There, he discovers who Lan Di is and why he is after the two mirrors. Ryo and the Chen conclude that his father must have been hiding the other mirror elsewhere. Back at home, Ine notes that Iwao visited an antique dealer days before he died. Ryo visits the dealer's store and learns what his father left behind. Days later, Ryo unlocks a secret room containing the second mirror thanks to a conversation he had with Fuku. At the warehouse, Ryo shows it to Master Chen and Guizhang and learns more about the history of the mirrors. Suddenly, Chai, who attacked Ryo at the dojo, ambushes them and manages to steal the mirror, but is unable to escape with it. Master Chen believes the man to be a member of either the Chi You Men or Mad Angels. Wanting to know where Lan Di would go next, Master Chen answers Hong Kong, with Ryo announcing his intention to follow him there.
4	"Shackles"; Transliteration: "Shikkoku" (Japanese: 桎梏(しっこく))	Tomonori Kurokawa	Tomonori Kurokawa	Kumiko Horikoshi	February 27, 2022	May 24, 2022
After discovering how much money he needs to purchase a ticket to Hong Kong, Ryo starts working for a company at the harbor, where the boss introduces him to Mark Kimberly. At the end of the day, Ryo is met by Goro Mihashi, who shows him around the harbor. Meanwhile, Terry from the Mad Angels is informed by his men about how Ryo is snooping around. That night, Ryo runs into Nozomi and they talk at the Sakura Park. The next day, Mark is beaten by members of the Mad Angels. When Ryo arrives, Mark demands he flee, but he stays and defeats the men. Mark reveals he is working to find his son, who had joined the Mad Angels. That same night, after making a flower delivery at a harbor bar, Nozomi tails two members only to be caught. After Ryo discovers her captivity, he is forced to fight and kill Guizhang. Before confronting him, Ryo manages to write the number of the warehouse Nozomi is being held in for Goro to find. Ryo then confronts Guizhang where they both fight and seemingly knock each other out.
5	"Equal"; Transliteration: "Hitchū" (Japanese: 匹儔(ひっちゅう))	Keiko Oyamada	Hisao Yokobori	Kensuke Ishikawa & Satoshi Umizuka	March 6, 2022	May 31, 2022
Goro notices Ryo's message and immediately notifies Mai Sawano. They run to the harbor where they meet Mark. After he is informed of the situation, all three manage to rescue Nozomi. Back outside the harbor, Ryo and Guizhang get up and surprise the Mad Angels. It is revealed that they were secretly working together during their fight. Terry summons a majority of his gang to attack them, but they are all beaten. Ryo then allows Guizhang to fight and defeat Terry, who goes on to warn Ryo that following Lan Di to Hong Kong is a foolish mission. Days later, Ryo formally quits his harbor job. After he bids farewell to Mark, Ine, Fuku and Nozomi, Ryo heads to port where he is met by Master Chen, who informs Ryo that Guizhang will accompany him to Hong Kong. Suddenly, the group is once again attacked by Chai, who manages to fracture Guizhang's leg before he is knocked into the water by Ryo. Despite the injury, Guizhang insists on coming along, but Ryo dissuades him. Ryo then boards a boat heading to Hong Kong.
6	"Dignified"; Transliteration: "Rinko" (Japanese: 凜乎(りんこ))	Atsushi Wakabayashi & Maki Kodaira	Yūichirō Yano	Kumiko Horikoshi	March 13, 2022	June 7, 2022
Ryo arrives in Hong Kong and nearly gets hit by a woman on a motorbike who warns him about pickpockets. Soon after, a boy named Wong tricks Ryo into helping him, allowing his gang to steal Ryo's bag. Reporting the theft to the police proves futile, and Ryo struggles to find a place to stay. Searching for Lishao Tao, he meets an old man practicing Tai Chi, who briefly spars with him and later offers guidance if Ryo masters the Iron Palm technique. At Man Mo Temple, Ryo speaks to a praying woman who denies knowing Tao. A monk refuses to let him meet Tao, saying he is not ready. That night, Joy helps Ryo fend off some thugs and finds him a hotel. The next day, Ryo tracks down Wong and reclaims his bag. Successfully completing the old man's challenge, Ryo learns a principle of Wude. Returning to the temple, he recites it to the monk, revealing his search for Yuanda Zhu. The woman from earlier reveals herself as Lishao Tao, warning Ryo of the dangers ahead. Meanwhile, Wong and his gang report Ryo's presence to a mysterious figure who takes an interest in him.
7	"Future"; Transliteration: "Kyōgo" (Japanese: 嚮後(きょうご))	Yoshihiro Sugai	Yoshihiro Sugai	Kensuke Ishikawa & Youichi Takada	March 20, 2022	June 14, 2022
Ryo spars against Lishao Tao to confirm her identity but is easily overpowered. She refuses to help him and asks him to leave. After speaking with Monk Hanhui, Ryo seeks out the Guang Martial Arts School to learn more about Wude. Grandmaster Zhoushan Xuan refuses to teach him, feeling unworthy due to a past mistake. Joy directs Ryo to a mall performer who skillfully defeats thugs. Ryo meets a homeless man, Zongquan, who uses him for a street performance. When Ryo asks about Wude, Zongquan declines, mirroring Zhoushan's words. Learning of their connection, Ryo informs Zhoushan, who reveals he had to banish Zongquan for misusing martial arts. Ryo later finds Zongquan avoiding a fight with Yellow Head thugs. The next day, Ryo sees Zongquan face the gang again, recognizing he is still following martial arts principles. Zongquan asks Ryo to deliver a letter to Zhoushan, leading to the revelation of the Wude principle Jie. Returning to Lishao, Ryo realizes his lack of Jie was a reason for her rejection. She remains firm in refusing to help, but allows him to stay in her home, revealing her real name.
8	"Aspiration"; Transliteration: "Kikyū" (Japanese: 冀求(ききゅう))	Tomoyuki Kurokawa & Keiko Oyamada	Tomoyuki Kurokawa	Youichi Takada, Koichi Suenaga & Yumiko Shirai	March 27, 2022	June 21, 2022
Ryo dreams of Lan Di meeting Shenhua. Upon waking, Fangmei delivers Lishao's message: he must move books outside to dry. While working, Ryo falls from a ladder and is scolded. Annoyed by the chores, Fangmei reminds him it is his "rent" for staying. He leaves, knowing the books must be returned by 3 PM. While searching for martial artists, Ryo nearly drops an old lady's package and is forced to carry it to a tea shop. Inside, she reveals it is a tea set and shares its history before leaving. Joy and Wong meet Ryo, and together they seek martial artists but find none who know Wude. Meanwhile, Lishao and Fangmei save two children from thugs. The boy, wanting revenge, triggers a dark memory in Lishao, who warns against such pursuits. Returning late, Ryo is scolded again. Joy and Wong later inform him about Guixiang, a martial artist at Yan Tin apartments. Ryo arrives to find the old lady from earlier under attack. He defeats the assailants, and she reveals herself as Guixiang, teaching him the Wude principle Yi. Back at the temple, Lishao acknowledges Ryo's revenge-driven heart and refused help because of it. Fangmei apologizes and hints at Wulinshu, a book written by Yuanda Zhu, which Ryo then finds.
9	"Distinct"; Transliteration: "Chōhyō" (Japanese: 徴標(ちょうひょう))	Keiko Oyamada & Nobuo Tomizawa	Takashi Sano	Youichi Takada	April 3, 2022	June 28, 2022
Ryo reads Wulinshu and recalls Lan Di accusing his father of killing Sunming Zhao. A note falls from the book, showing a four-circle Chawan Sign. Guixiang explains its meaning, revealing it as a mark of Yuanda Zhu's allies. Ryo uses the sign and is invited to Man Mo Park at 9 PM but is ambushed and knocked out. Awakening at Man Mo Temple, he notices Lishao's old photo and learns from Fangmei that her real name is connected to her brother, Ziming. Later, Ryo sets up the sign again at a restaurant and receives a mysterious message to meet up together at 8 PM. He meets an associate of Yuanda Zhu, but before they can talk, the Yellow Head gang ambushes them. The man is captured, but Ryo fights back. Lishao quietly eliminates more gang members without Ryo noticing. The associate, Shuqin, warns that Yuanda Zhu is being hunted by the Chi You Men and advises Ryo to find Ren of the Heavens gang. Ryo meets Ren, who tricks him into a gang deal, then steals the money, forcing Ryo to fight his way out. After a chase, they fall onto crates, and Ren sees Ryo's mirror. Intrigued, he agrees to help. The next day, Ryo learns the final Wude principle Dan and confronts Lishao about her brother. With their ideologies clashing, Ryo decides to leave the temple.
10	"Comeback"; Transliteration: "Kaiten" (Japanese: 廻天(かいてん))	Keiko Oyamada & Nobuo Tomizawa	Takashi Sano	Youichi Takada	April 10, 2022	July 5, 2022
Ryo and Ren travel to Kowloon to meet Yang, who instructs them to approach a man in black with a special password. Following the instructions, they are led to a room where Yuanda Zhu is supposedly held. Ren, sensing a trap, stays behind while Ryo enters — only to be ambushed by the Yellow Heads and their leader, Dou Niu. Ren intervenes, but both are overpowered and locked up, handcuffed together. Ren explains the Yellow Heads' rise to power before they trick their guard and escape. Meanwhile, Lan Di learns of their capture, but soon after, the Yellow Heads report their escape. As Ryo and Ren attempt to take an elevator, Yuan confronts them, followed by a rampaging Dou. They barely escape, and the next day, Wong unlocks their cuffs. Interrogating Yang again, they are directed to Huang. Searching his tapes, they uncover a conversation mentioning Yuanda Zhu and his captured acquaintance, Shuqin Zhang. Following a lead, they stake out a bird shop, ambush Yuan, and trick Dou into a closet before rescuing Shuqin. He reveals Yuanda is hiding in the Ghost Hall Building and gives them key-shaped clues. They locate Yuanda but are pursued. Ren escapes, while Ryo is thrown out a window by Dou — only to be saved by Lishao.
11	"Entangled"; Transliteration: "Chūbyū" (Japanese: 綢繆(ちゅうびゅう))	Ouri Yasukawa	Yukihiro Matsushita	Youichi Takada & Kensuke Ishikawa	April 17, 2022	July 12, 2022
Yuanda subdues Yuan's men, but Yuan slices his cane in half. Lishao defeats Dou, who flees after learning Yuan captured Yuanda. Ryo faints from his wounds and awakens in a church, where Lishao tends to him and shares her brother Ziming's story — how he sought revenge, a path she hopes Ryo will avoid. Before Ryo leaves, Lishao spars with him, easily overwhelming him, and teaches him a special move. At Ren's hideout, Shuqin informs them Yuanda was taken to the Yellow Head Building. Joy demands an explanation and reacts anxiously upon hearing the gang's name. Following Shuqin's lead, Ryo spars with a skilled fighter who teaches him to rely less on sight in darkness. The fighter, who knew Ryo's father, provides intel on infiltrating the Yellow Heads. Ryo wins a series of arena fights, impressing a man named Yuandao, who sets up a match with Greg More. Ryo wins swiftly, leading Yuandao to reveal more information. Meanwhile, Joy visits her mother's grave, revealing she was assassinated by the Yellow Heads. Wong, pressured by friends to steal, overhears a conversation about Ryo and is chased. Ryo meets Yuandao again but is led into a trap. Ren forces Yuandao to reveal Yuanda's location before causing a diversion. They find the hostage room empty, only to be confronted by Dou. Elsewhere, Wong escapes his pursuer with Joy's help and warns her of the danger Ryo and Ren are in.
12	"Guidepost"; Transliteration: "Miotsukushi" (Japanese: 澪標(みおつくし))	Yūichirō Yano	Yūichirō Yano	Kumiko Horikoshi & Kensuke Ishikawa	April 24, 2022	July 19, 2022
Wong wants to change his ways and leaves to help Ryo and Ren, while Joy initially hesitates but later decides to assist. At the Yellow Head Building, Ryo and Ren evade Dou by crossing a wooden plank ledge, which Ren kicks over. Meanwhile, Joy and Wong plan their rescue, but Joy is caught red-handed after confronting Dou under the guise of the White Tai's daughter. Wong sneaks into the vents and discovers Yuanda Zhu's location. Ryo and Ren evade a chainsaw-wielding Yuan by trapping him under debris. Using a stolen walkie-talkie, Ren intercepts Yuan's orders to capture Joy. Meanwhile, Wong throws rats onto Yuan, causing a distraction. Ryo and Ren locate Joy in the basement but face Lu Zhang, whom Ryo defeats using Wude teachings. Joy awakens as Ren learns from the walkie-talkie that Wong has found Yuanda. Wong and Yuanda are confronted by Dou in an elevator. Meanwhile, Ryo and Ren subdue a deranged Yuan and extract intel about the trade-off's location. Reaching the rooftop, Ryo sees Lan Di arriving in a helicopter.
13	"Shenmue"; Transliteration: "Shenmū" (Japanese: 莎木(シェンムー))	Chikara Sakurai	Chikara Sakurai	Yumiko Shirai, Youichi Takada & Kensuke Ishikawa	May 1, 2022	July 26, 2022
Ryo finally faces Lan Di on the rooftop, but before he can engage, Dou Niu threatens to drop Wong off the edge. Lan Di easily counters Ryo's attacks, acknowledging his growth but still overpowering him. Ren intervenes, cautioning Ryo to stay focused. Yuanda Zhu bargains with Lan Di, revealing that what he seeks is in Bailu Village. Lan Di departs via helicopter, leaving Dou to finish off Ryo and Ren. Ren's words make Ryo recall past lessons, allowing him to regain control of the fight. He defeats Dou with the Swallow Dive and Counter Elbow Assault, staying true to Wude principles. Afterward, Yuanda Zhu reveals that Lan Di, whose real name is Longsun Zhao, seeks revenge for his own father's death. Learning that Bailu Village is the mirrors' origin, Ryo sets off to follow Lan Di. Bidding farewell to Joy, Wong and Lishao, Ryo departs for Guilin. He rescues a girl named Shenhua from a river and learns of her connection to the Shenmue tree. Exploring a cave, they uncover a mystery tied to the mirrors.
