= SunSet Swish =

Japanese band

- Origin: Osaka, Japan
- Genres: J-pop, pop rock, piano rock
- Years active: 2004–2011, 2015–present
- Labels: SME Records (2005–2011); YARD Ltd. (2015–present)
- Members: Junzō Ishida; Daisuke Saeki; Yūki Tomida
- Website: SunSet Swish official site

SunSet Swish is a Japanese band formed in 2004 in Hirakata City, Osaka Prefecture. Originally known as Swish, they debuted as SunSet Swish in 2005 with their first single "Ashita, Waraeru You ni." The band's third single, "My Pace," released in 2006, earned them the New Artist Award and was featured as the ending theme for the anime "Bleach."

In 2007, their sixth single "Mosaic Kakera" was chosen as the ending theme for Code Geass, further establishing their association with anime music. The band continued to release singles, including "I Love You" in 2008, which gained popularity as a commercial song.

SunSet Swish went on hiatus in 2011, during which time the members pursued individual activities. Vocalist Daisuke Saeki, for example, worked as a salaryman. The band resumed activities in 2015 with the self-produced single "Shiawase no Ito." From 2016 to 2017, they briefly changed their name to Swish! and released their first mini-album "Shaka" in 2018 under this name.

During the COVID-19 pandemic, the band adapted by performing online concerts. They reverted to their original name in 2021 and released several digital singles. The band remains active, having conducted a live tour in 2022 and released new music, including the Encount album. SunSet Swish's music spans various genres, primarily focusing on pop-rock, and they have a significant following in the realm of anime soundtracks. On March 22, 2023, SunSet Swish re-recorded the original versions of "My Pace" (the sixth ending theme from the anime Bleach) and "Mosaic Kakera" (the second ending theme from the anime Code Geass). On December 27, 2024, SunSet Swish announced their live on Shibuya, Tokyo for their 20th anniversary live on May 6, 2025.

== Members ==
- Junzō Ishida (石田 順三, Ishida Junzō; born February 28, 1981)

Plays the piano.

- Daisuke Saeki (佐伯 大介, Saeki Daisuke; born August 28, 1979)

Vocals.

- Yūki Tomita (冨田 勇樹, Tomita Yūki; born July 13, 1980)

Plays the guitar.

== Discography ==
=== Singles ===
1. Ashita, Waraeru Yō Ni (明日、笑えるように) (June 1, 2005)
  1. Ashita, Waraeru Yō Ni (明日、笑えるように) - theme song of Kansai TV and Fuji TV's drama series, Magarikado no Kanojo (曲がり角の彼女)
  2. Every day
2. Kaze no Runner (風のランナー, Kaze no Rannā) (January 25, 2006)
  1. Kaze no Runner (風のランナー, Kaze no Rannā) (5th ED theme of TV Tokyo's Beet the Vandel Buster)
  2. Ame no Chihare (雨のち晴れ)
3. My Pace (マイペース, Mai Pēsu) (March 1, 2006)
  1. My Pace (マイペース, Mai Pēsu) (6th ED theme of TV Tokyo's anime series Bleach)
  2. Suna no Object (砂のオブジェ, Suna no Obuje)
  3. My Pace (original karaoke) (マイペース（オリジナル・カラオケ）, Mai Pēsu (orijinaru karaoke))
4. Natsu ga Kureba (夏が来れば) (July 5, 2006)
  1. Natsu ga Kureba (夏が来れば)
  2. Mikazuki no Fune (三日月の舟)
  3. Time Capsule (タイムカプセル, Taimu kapuseru)
  4. Natsu ga Kureba (original karaoke) (夏が来れば （オリジナル・カラオケ）, Natsu ga Kureba (orijinaru karaoke))
5. Kimi ga Iru Kara (君がいるから) (October 18, 2006)
  1. Kimi ga Iru Kara (君がいるから)
  2. Ai ni Iku Yo (会いに行くよ)
  3. Kimi ga Iru Kara (original karaoke) (君がいるから（オリジナル・カラオケ）, Kimi ga Iru Kara (orijinaru karaoke)
6. Mosaic Kakera (モザイクカケラ, Mozaiku Kakera) (February 28, 2007)
  1. Mosaic Kakera (モザイクカケラ, Mozaiku Kakera) (2nd ED theme song of Code Geass "Mosaic Kakera")
  2. Kagayaki (輝き)
  3. My Pace (マイペース) - ~Premium Live Ver.~Recorded at Shibuya BOXX on 15 Nov 2006
  4. Mosaic Kakera (モザイクカケラ) - Code Geass Ending Ver.
  5. Mosaic Kakera (Original Karaoke) (モザイクカケラ (オリジナルカラオケ))
7. Arigatō (ありがとう) (August 22, 2007)
  1. Arigatō (ありがとう) (2nd ED theme song of Ōkiku Furikabutte)
  2. Egao ga Suteki sa (笑顔が素敵さ)
  3. Top Of The Morning
  4. Arigatō (ありがとう) - Ōkiku Furikabutte Ver.
  5. Arigatō (Original Karaoke) (モザイクカケラ (オリジナルカラオケ))
8. Passion (March 5, 2008)
  1. Passion
9. Asunaro (あすなろ) (November 5, 2008)
  1. Asunaro (あすなろ)
  2. Kaze no Runner (風のランナー) - ~2008.08.24 Hibiya Ya-on Version~
10. Sakurabito (さくらびと) (January 13, 2010)
  1. Sakurabito (さくらびと) (21st ED theme song of Bleach)

=== Albums ===
1. Anata no Machi de Aimashō (あなたの街で逢いましょう) (November 15, 2006)
  1. Kaze no Runner (Album Ver) (風のランナー (Album Ver), Kaze no Rannā (Album Ver))
  2. I Know
  3. My Pace (マイペース, Mai Pēsu)
  4. Yasashī Kaze (優しい風)
  5. Tsubasa o Motsu Mono Tachi e (翼を持つ者達へ)
  6. Anata no Machi de Aimashō (あなたの街で逢いましょう)
  7. Homerun
  8. Natsu ga Kureba (夏が来れば)
  9. Hooray! Hooray! (フレー! フレー!, Furē! Furē!)
  10. Ame no Chihare (Album Ver) (雨のち晴れ (Album Ver))
  11. Kimi ga Iru Kara (君がいるから)
  12. Ashita, Waraeru Yō Ni (Album Ver) (明日、笑えるように (Album Ver))
2. PASSION (July 23, 2008)
  1. Supercar (スーパーカー, Sūpākā)
  2. Megumi no Tane (恵みの種)
  3. I Love You
  4. Corona (コロナ)
  5. Good Morning
  6. Bye-Bye
  7. Arigatō (Album Version) (ありがとう)
  8. Smile
  9. I'm Sorry
  10. Mosaic Kakera (モザイクカケラ, Mozaiku Kakera)
  11. Hero
  12. Kagayaki (輝き)
  13. Natsuiro Puzzle (夏色パズル, Natsuiro Pazuru)
  14. Kasumisō (カスミソウ)
  15. Passion
3. Yūgure Maestro (夕暮れマエストロ, Yūgure Maesutoro) (February 17, 2010)
  1. Mabataki mo Sezu (瞬きもせず)
  2. Tooku e (遠くへ)
  3. Sakurabito (さくらびと)
  4. Sayonara o Ienakatta (さよならを言えなかった)
  5. La Digo
  6. Rōman Shōnen (浪漫少年)
  7. Hajime Kara Hitotsu Dake (始めから一つだけ)
  8. Night DE Night (ナイトDEナイト, Naito DE Naito)
  9. Sachi (幸)
  10. Asunaro (あすなろ)
  11. Yūgure Maestro (夕暮れマエストロ, Yūgure Maesutoro)
  12. Heart
