= Big Windup! =

Japanese manga series

- First tankōbon volume cover, featuring Ren Mihashi

おおきく振りかぶって (Ōkiku Furikabutte)
- Genre: Sports
- Manga
- Written by: Asa Higuchi
- Published by: Kodansha
- Imprint: Afternoon KC
- Magazine: Monthly Afternoon
- Original run: September 25, 2003 – present
- Volumes: 38
- Anime television series
- Directed by: Tsutomu Mizushima
- Produced by: Ryō Ōyama; Tomonori Ochikoshi; Gō Tanaka; Masayuki Hariu; Kozue Kaneniwa; Hiroo Maruyama
- Written by: Yōsuke Kuroda
- Music by: Shirō Hamaguchi
- Studio: A-1 Pictures
- Licensed by: NA: Funimation (S1); Right Stuf (S2)
- Original network: MBS, TBS
- English network: SEA: Animax; US: Funimation Channel
- Original run: April 13, 2007 – June 25, 2010
- Episodes: 38 + 2 OVAs
- icon

Big Windup! (Japanese: おおきく振りかぶって, Hepburn: Ōkiku Furikabutte), often shortened to Oofuri (おお振り), is a Japanese baseball-themed manga series written and illustrated by Asa Higuchi. It has been serialized in Kodansha's seinen manga magazine Monthly Afternoon since September 2003, with its chapters collected in 38 tankōbon volumes as of June 2025. The series follows Ren Mihashi, a timid school ace pitcher with low self-esteem who transfers to Nishiura High School in Saitama Prefecture. There, new teammates and a coach help him regain his confidence and skills.

It was adapted into an anime television series, directed by Tsutomu Mizushima and animated by A-1 Pictures, which aired for 25 episodes on TBS from April to September 2007. A 13-episode second season was broadcast from April to June 2010. In North America, the first season was licensed by Funimation, while the second season was licensed by Right Stuf.

By August 2023, the manga had over 18 million copies in circulation. It won the Tezuka Osamu Cultural Prize for best creative work in 2006 and the Kodansha Manga Award for general manga in 2007. The anime series has been overall well received by critics, praising its story, characters, and emphasis on strategy and teamwork, though its pacing has received somewhat mixed response.

== Story ==
The series, set in Saitama Prefecture, follows the story of Ren Mihashi. Mihashi was the previous ace pitcher in his middle school's baseball team, but it seems that he only got the position because his grandfather was the owner of the school. His teammates (especially the team's catcher, Hatake) hated him, and they always lost their games. Mihashi is thoroughly convinced that he is a lousy baseball pitcher, and feels guilty because he believes that he is responsible for all the losses. Mihashi graduates through middle school with extremely low self-esteem. But in truth Mihashi is really a hardworking and skillful pitcher, and the main reason why his team always lost all the games is because of bad cooperation, because his teammates never talked about the game with him, and they did not try to come up with a plan or strategy to fight against their rivals. Mihashi then transfers to Nishiura High School with plans of quitting baseball because he thinks he is not good enough to succeed at it, though he still loves the game deeply. However, he is dragged into Nishiura's baseball team by their coach, Momoe, while watching the team training outside the field. Assisted by his new teammates (and especially the catcher, Takaya Abe), he grows in stature, confidence and skill, helping his team excel with his own abilities.

== Characters ==
=== Nishiura Baseball Team ===
Nishiura High School Baseball Team and associated members (from left to right, front row): Izumi, Hanai, Mizutani, Oki, Tajima, Mihashi, Nishihiro, Abe, Suyama, Sakaeguchi, and Ai-chan the dog; (left to right, back row): Shiga, Shino'oka, and Momoe

Ren Mihashi (三橋 廉, Mihashi Ren)
Voiced by: Tsubasa Yonaga (Japanese); Sean Michael Teague (English)
Mihashi serves as the pitcher for Nishiura High School's baseball team. Despite his exceptional skill, honed through years of dedication, he struggles with severe nervousness and self-doubt. His middle school teammates ostracized him, believing he only secured the role of ace because his grandfather owned the school. During games, they deliberately refused to cooperate, resulting in consistent losses. After enrolling at Nishiura, Mihashi joins the baseball team but remains fearful of repeating his past failures. Over time, he gradually develops confidence and learns to trust his teammates, particularly catcher Abe, though he retains his timid demeanor.
Takaya Abe (阿部 隆也, Abe Takaya)
Voiced by: Yuichi Nakamura (Japanese); Greg Ayres (English)
Abe is the catcher for Nishiura High School's baseball team, forming the battery with pitcher Mihashi. A serious and disciplined player, he possesses a sharp strategic mind and excels at analyzing opposing batters' weaknesses, directing Mihashi's pitches accordingly. Though short-tempered, Abe initially values Mihashi for his compliance but gradually shifts his focus toward boosting the pitcher's confidence. While prone to outbursts and occasional harshness, he becomes increasingly supportive and attuned to Mihashi's emotions over time. Abe rarely displays vulnerability, maintaining a reserved demeanor even as his competitive drive occasionally manifests as jealousy.
Yuuichirou Tajima (田島 悠一郎, Tajima Yūichirō)
Voiced by: Hiro Shimono (Japanese); Todd Haberkorn (English)
Tajima serves as the team's cleanup hitter. Despite his small stature limiting his power hitting, his exceptional batting skills and baseball intelligence make him one of the team's most valuable players. Outgoing and confident, he maintains a friendly though often overly flirtatious demeanor. Tajima forms a close bond with Mihashi, frequently interpreting the pitcher's unclear speech for others, leading many to compare their dynamic to that of brothers. His enthusiasm for catching fastballs results in him occasionally filling in as a backup catcher during training or when Abe is unavailable.
Azusa Hanai (花井 梓, Hanai Azusa)
Voiced by: Kishō Taniyama (Japanese); Joel McDonald (English)
Azusa bats fifth for the team, having previously served as cleanup hitter in middle school. Initially brash and confrontational, he demonstrates keen observational skills and baseball intelligence, earning unanimous selection as team captain. Though competitive with Tajima, he prioritizes team strategy over personal rivalry, focusing on consistent performance rather than risky plays.
Yuuto Sakaeguchi (栄口 勇人, Sakaeguchi Yūto)
Voiced by: Chihiro Suzuki (Japanese); Aaron Dismuke (English)
Sakaeguchi typically bats second in the lineup. Having attended the same middle school as Abe, he maintains a familiar rapport with the catcher and often mediates communication between Abe and Mihashi due to his understanding of both players' tendencies. Under pressure, he experiences nervous digestive issues, a trait Abe observed during their high school entrance examinations. Among teammates, he shares the closest relationship with Suyama as classmates. Sakaeguchi's mother died prior to his high school years.
Kousuke Izumi (泉 孝介, Izumi Kōsuke)
Voiced by: Jun Fukuyama (Japanese); Chris Burnett (English)
Izumi ranks among the team's more experienced players, demonstrating strong batting, catching, and base-running skills. He shares a classroom with Mihashi and Tajima, regularly joining them for lunchtime conversations followed by naps. Having attended the same elementary and junior high school as Hamada—though Hamada was a year ahead—Izumi frequently provokes his former senior rather than showing deference. His serious demeanor makes him particularly susceptible to irritation, especially toward Abe's persistent arguments during games.
Shoji Suyama (巣山 尚治, Suyama Shōji)
Voiced by: Makoto Yasumura (Japanese); Anthony Bowling (English)
Suyama plays as the team's shortstop and third baseman. More reserved than his teammates, he maintains a calm demeanor, though displays uncharacteristic intensity when refusing Momoe's offer of a particular protein supplement he dislikes. Unlike other players, he shows little interest in typical adolescent pursuits, reflecting his relatively mature outlook. Among teammates, he shares the closest bond with Sakaeguchi.
Fumiki Mizutani (水谷 文貴, Mizutani Fumiki)
Voiced by: Kenichirō Sumi (Japanese); Jean-Luc Hester (English)
Mizutani plays left field for Nishiura, displaying less technical proficiency than his teammates. His occasional fielding errors lead Abe to derisively call him the "Crap Left". At bat, he relies heavily on chance rather than skill, acknowledging his poor pitch recognition. The most lighthearted team member, he shares Mihashi's playful demeanor. During non-practice hours, he frequently wears headphones, suggesting an interest in music.
Kazutoshi Oki (沖 一利, Oki Kazutoshi)
Voiced by: Yūdai Satō (Japanese); Chris Cason (English)
Nishiura's reserve pitcher and first baseman exhibits extreme shyness, rarely voicing opinions for fear of reprimand. Though more experienced at pitching than Hanai, he initially avoids admitting this to escape official game appearances. Mihashi's dedication eventually inspires him to commit fully to the team's efforts.
Shintarou Nishihiro (西広 辰太郎, Nishihiro Shintarō)
Voiced by: Ryōhei Kimura (Japanese); Scott Hinze (English)
Nishihiro serves as Nishiura's reserve player, primarily supporting the team from the bench. During offensive plays, he routinely acts as third base coach. His limited baseball experience restricts him mostly to left field when playing. Academically gifted, he maintains strong test performance without apparent study.

=== Associated members ===
Maria Momoe (百枝 まりあ, Momoe Maria)
Voiced by: Risa Hayamizu (Japanese); Cynthia Cranz (English)
Momoe serves as Nishiura's head baseball coach, becoming the most prominent adult figure associated with the team. A Nishiura graduate from when the school offered softball rather than baseball, she earns the nickname "Momokan" from players who respect yet find her intimidating. Known for her physical strength and dedication, she works additional jobs to fund team equipment. Despite initial skepticism about a female baseball coach, she demonstrates clear competence in the role. Her small dog Ai regularly attends team practices and games.
Chiyo Shino'oka (篠岡 千代, Shinooka Chiyo)
Voiced by: Misato Fukuen (Japanese); Cherami Leigh (English)
As team manager, she handles administrative duties with meticulous dedication, preparing meals and compiling detailed opponent analyses. She maintains comprehensive records of all players' full names and birthdays. Though she claims no romantic interest in teammates, she privately acknowledges feelings for Abe but refrains from acting to preserve team dynamics. A graduate of the same middle school as Abe and Sakaeguchi, she previously played softball as a shortstop. Outside official duties, she enjoys exchanging school uniforms with friends for photographs.
Tsuyoshi Shiga (志賀 剛司, Shiga Tsuyoshi)
Voiced by: Takehiro Murozono (Japanese); Chuck Huber (English)
Shiga serves as the faculty advisor for the baseball team. A mathematics teacher with extensive knowledge of human physiology, he lacks baseball expertise but contributes through meditation techniques that aid players' mental development. His relaxation and concentration exercises help strengthen team cohesion, particularly benefiting Mihashi.
Yoshirou Hamada (浜田 良郎, Hamada Yoshirō)
Voiced by: Atsushi Kisaichi (Japanese); Christopher Bevins (English)
Hamada, a childhood friend of Mihashi, previously played baseball with him before quitting reportedly due to "Little League elbow". He organizes the team's cheering squad and demonstrates skill in sewing. Known to teammates by Mihashi's childhood nickname "Hama-chan," he shares an educational background with Izumi, who disregards Hamada's seniority by one year. After repeating a grade due to part-time work commitments, he lives independently following his family's relocation. Though rumors circulate about his reputation among female classmates, these remain unsubstantiated.
Keisuke Umehara (梅原 圭介, Umehara Keisuke) and Riki Kajiyama (梶山 力, Kajiyama Riki)
Voiced by: Takashi Hikita (Japanese); Eric Vale (English) (Umehara)
Voiced by: Shūhei Sakaguchi (Japanese); J. Michael Tatum (English) (Kajiyama)
Two of Hamada's friends and former classmates who agree to join the baseball teams cheering squad.

=== Opposition ===
Several rival teams feature prominently in the series. Mihoshi Academy, Mihashi's former team where he served as ace pitcher for three years, includes battery partners Kanou and Hatake, along with cleanup hitter Hiroyuki Oda. Musashino First's ace pitcher Haruna motivates his previously indifferent team to improve their performance. The squad includes starting pitcher Naoto Kaguyama, captain Ohkawa, and reserve pitcher Kyouhei Akimaru. Reigning Koshien champions Tosei High School initially underestimates Nishiura, fielding ace pitcher Junta Takase (known for his sinkers and forkballs) and captain Kazuki Kawai.

Shuugo Kanou (叶 修悟, Kanoō Shūgo)
Voiced by: Jun Oosuka (Japanese); Jamie McGonnigal (English)
Kanou assumes the starting pitcher position after Mihashi's departure from Mihoshi Academy, employing a forkball as his primary strikeout pitch. Though teammates claim he would have been ace earlier if not for Mihashi's grandfather influencing the selection, Kanou recognizes Mihashi's genuine ability and disapproves of how the team treated him. During a practice game against Nishiura, he becomes the first Mihoshi player to compete seriously, eventually persuading his teammates to do the same. The two pitchers share a childhood friendship, with Mihashi.
Atsushi Hatake (畠 篤史, Hatake Atsushi)
Voiced by: Shintarou Oohata (Japanese); Jessie James Grelle (English)
Hatake serves as Mihoshi Academy's catcher. During middle school, he strongly opposed Mihashi's position as ace pitcher, maintaining Kanou's superior ability and even threatening physical harm against Mihashi after his transfer to Nishiura. Kanou eventually persuades Hatake to compete seriously against Mihashi. Following their defeat, Hatake reconciles with Mihashi's team while still insisting on Kanou's pitching superiority.
Motoki Haruna (榛名 元希, Haruna Motoki)
Voiced by: Masaya Matsukaze (Japanese); Kevin M. Connolly (English)
Haruna serves as Musashino's backup pitcher and maintains professional baseball aspirations. A former teammate of Abe, he initially rejects him as catcher due to concerns about his height and abilities. Though their relationship improves, tensions persist regarding Haruna's cautious pitching approach—he limits himself to 80 pitches, avoids full exertion, and once refuses to throw sliders due to a mosquito bite. His current catcher Akimaru observes Haruna displayed more aggressive tendencies during middle school, acknowledging Abe's perspective. Haruna's work ethic inspires teammates, particularly preventing Naoto Kaguyama from quitting.

=== Other characters ===
Ruri Mihashi (三橋 瑠里, Mihashi Ruri)
Voiced by: Marina Inoue (Japanese); Monica Rial (English)
Ruri, Mihashi's cousin, befriended him and Kanou during childhood visits. Mihashi avoided inviting her to his middle school games out of embarrassment over his team's losses. She later attends Nishiura's match against Tosei, impressed by his performance. Ruri affectionately calls him Renren, much to his discomfort—a habit his teammates tease him about. She has a younger brother named Ryuu.

== Development ==
While growing up in Saitama, Asa Higuchi became familiar with baseball by reading the manga Dokaben. When she was in high school, the story of a local baseball team wound up inspiring her to come up with the idea for her own baseball manga. In the original version, Mihashi never spoke and characters like Momoe, Kanou and Haruna did not exist yet. Following that, she collected data on high school baseball for over 10 years in order to create the manga, and she worked with the school she had attended, Urawanishi High School, in the year prior to the serialization.

Five months prior to the serialization in Monthly Afternoon, Higuchi published a one shot in the magazine titled "The Basic of Basics". The story was centered around the characters of the Musashino Dai Ichi school, who would show up in the series itself.

In May 2024, it was announced that the manga would enter on indefinite hiatus.

== Media ==
=== Manga ===
Written and illustrated by Asa Higuchi, Big Windup! started in Kodansha's seinen manga magazine Monthly Afternoon on September 25, 2003. (Note: The series began in the magazine's November 2003 issue, released on September 25 of that same year.) Kodansha has collected its chapters into individual tankōbon volumes. The first volume was released on March 23, 2004. As of June 23, 2025, 38 volumes have been released.

=== Anime ===
An anime television series adaptation was produced by A-1 Pictures. It was directed by Tsutomu Mizushima, with Yōsuke Kuroda handling series composition, Takahiko Yoshida designing the characters and Shirō Hamaguchi composing the music. It ran for 25 episodes and was broadcast in Japan on various Japan News Network stations, including TBS and MBS from April 13 to September 28, 2007. (Note: TBS listed the air for the series on Thursday at 25:25, which is effectively Friday at 1:25 a.m. JST.) The first opening theme is "Dramatic" (ドラマチック, Doramachikku), performed by Base Ball Bear, while the first ending theme is "Medaka no Mita Niji" (メダカの見た虹; lit. 'The Rainbow Seen by the Medaka'), performed by Kozue Takada. The second opening theme is "Seishun Line" (青春ライン; lit. 'Youth Line'), performed by Ikimonogakari, while the second ending theme is "Arigatō" (ありがとう; lit. 'Thank You'), performed by SunSet Swish.

A second season, subtitled Natsu no Taikai-hen (〜夏の大会編〜; lit. 'Summer Tournament Chapter'), aired for 13 episodes from April 2 to June 25, 2010. (Note: TBS listed the air dates for the series on Thursday at 25:25, which is effectively Friday at 1:25 a.m. JST; the first and last episode aired at 1:39 a.m. and 2:30 a.m., respectively.) The opening theme is "Natsuzora" (夏空; lit. 'Summer Sky'), performed by Galileo Galilei, and the ending theme is "Shisō Densha" (思想電車; lit. 'Thought Train'), by CureaL.

The series was licensed in North America by Funimation in 2008. It was released on two DVD sets, with an English dub, on August 18 and September 26, 2009, respectively. Lance Heiskell, marketing director of Funimation, announced in January 2010 that the company had no plans to release the second season due to low sales. The first season debuted on the Funimation Channel on March 14, 2011. The second season was licensed by Right Stuf and released on DVD (in Japanese audio with English subtitles) through its Nozomi Entertainment label on November 1, 2016.

=== Video game ===
A video game adaptation of the series, subtitled Honto no Ace ni Nareru Kamo (ホントのエースになれるかも, Honto no Ace ni Nareru Kamo; 'I Might Just Become the Real Ace'), was released for the Nintendo DS by Marvelous on December 13, 2007.

== Reception ==
=== Manga ===
In 2007, Big Windup! won the Kodansha Manga Award for general manga. In August 2011, Nikkei Entertainment magazine published a list of top 50 manga creators by sales since January 2010; the series author, Asa Higuchi, ranked 30th with over 2.24 million copies sold. The series was the 41st best selling manga in 2011, with over 1.09 million copies sold. By November 2019, the manga had over 15 million copies in circulation. By August 2023, it had over 18 million copies in circulation.

=== Anime ===
Carl Kimlinger of Anime News Network (ANN) awarded the first seven episodes a B+, praising the series for emphasizing "strategy and the technicalities of team play" over skills and thrills. He praised the series for its cohesive integration of narrative structure, directorial execution, musical composition, and vocal performances, which collectively deliver a deceptively straightforward premise, while skillfully incorporating nuanced tension and thematic complexity. Reviewing the second season, Kimlinger described it as a "quiet kind of series, with a quiet kind of charm", highlighting its "easygoing, perfectly balanced fun", and the surprising intensity of its cliffhangers.

Justin Sevakis (ANN) enjoyed the series but criticized the first season's second half for its slow pacing and "Shonen Tournament Syndrome." Despite this, he called it "the most compelling sports anime since Hajime no Ippo" and a "must-watch." Bamboo Dong (ANN) praised its focus on teamwork and character dynamics, but noted its slow pacing, calling it "one of the finest baseball anime" and "seriously underrated."

James Brusuelas (Animation World Network) recommended it to baseball fans for its technical accuracy but acknowledged its slow pacing. He appreciated its grounded approach compared to typical "supernatural high school" anime. Holly Ellingwood (Active Anime) lauded its humor, character depth, and animation, calling it "a baseball series that hits it out of the park"; she also praised its uplifting tone, and recommended it for fans of shows like The Prince of Tennis.

Brad Rice (Japanator) praised its strategic depth, likening it to Death Note without the intensity, and ranked it 47th in his "Top 50 Anime of the Decade" for making baseball accessible. Conversely, John Sinnott (DVD Talk) criticized protagonist Mihashi as "irritating", though he acknowledged the strong baseball drama of the series.
