= Shenmue II =

2001 video game

- European Dreamcast slipcase
- Developer: Sega AM2 (Note: Xbox version development support provided by Microsoft Game Studios Japan. Ported to Windows, Xbox One and PlayStation 4 by D3T.)
- Publisher: Sega
- Directors: Yu Suzuki; Shinichi Yoshino; Yoshihiro Okabayashi
- Producer: Yu Suzuki
- Designer: Eigo Kasahara
- Programmer: Makoto Wada
- Artist: Takehiko Mikami
- Writers: Yu Suzuki; Masahiro Yoshimoto; Takao Yotsuji
- Composers: List of composers: Takenobu Mitsuyoshi; Yuzo Koshiro; Ryuji Iuchi; Takeshi Yanagawa; Satoshi Miyashita; Koji Sakurai; Masataka Nitta; Shinji Otsuka; Fumio Ito; Megumi Takano; Osamu Murata; Shinichi Goto
- Series: Shenmue
- Platforms: Dreamcast; Xbox; Xbox 360 (Xbox Live); Windows; Xbox One; PlayStation 4
- Release: September 6, 2001: Dreamcast; JP: September 6, 2001; EU: November 30, 2001 Xbox; NA: October 29, 2002; EU: March 21, 2003 Xbox 360; NA/EU/PAL: December 15, 2006 Windows, Xbox One; WW: August 21, 2018 PlayStation 4; WW: August 21, 2018; JP: November 22, 2018
- Genre: Action-adventure
- Mode: Single-player

Shenmue II (Note: Shenmue II (Japanese: シェンムー2, Hepburn: Shenmū Tsū), pronounced [ɕe̞ɴ.mɯ̟ᵝː]; approximately /ˈʃɛn.muː/, "shen-moo") is a 2001 action-adventure game developed by Sega AM2, directed by Yu Suzuki and published by Sega for the Dreamcast in Japan and Europe in late 2001. An enhanced version was released for the Xbox in 2002 for North America and Europe in partnership with Microsoft Game Studios Japan.

Like the original Shenmue (1999), Shenmue II consists of open-world environments, brawler battles and quick-time events. It features a day-and-night system, variable weather effects, non-player characters with daily schedules, and various minigames. The player controls the teenage martial artist Ryo Hazuki as he arrives in Hong Kong in 1987 in pursuit of his father's killer. His journey takes him to Kowloon and the mountains of Guilin, where he meets a girl who is part of his destiny.

Some of Shenmue II was developed alongside the original Shenmue, the most expensive video game ever developed at the time. The Dreamcast version was not released in North America, where Microsoft Game Studios secured console exclusivity for the Xbox. Shenmue II received acclaim for its story and scale, and appears in lists of the greatest games. Reviews of the Xbox version were less positive, with critics finding its graphics lacking compared to other Xbox games.

Shenmue II sold poorly and contributed to the failure of the Dreamcast and Sega's financial problems. In 2018, Sega released high-definition ports of Shenmue and Shenmue II for Windows, Xbox One and PlayStation 4. Shenmue III, developed by Suzuki's company Ys Net, was released in 2019 following a successful crowdfunding campaign.

== Gameplay ==
Like the original Shenmue, the player controls the teenage martial artist Ryo Hazuki in his journey for revenge. Most of the game is spent exploring the open world, searching for clues, examining objects and talking to non-player characters for information. The game features a 3D fighting system similar to Sega's Virtua Fighter series; Ryo can fight multiple opponents at once and practice moves to increase their power. In quick-time events, the player must press the right combination of buttons at the right moment to succeed.

Shenmue II adds several features. Players can ask for directions from passersby, and fast-forward the game clock when waiting for a scheduled event, such as a shop opening or character arriving. Unlike the first Shenmue, taking a job is not part of the main story, and the player can choose how to earn money—for example, by gambling, arm wrestling, street fighting or running a pachinko stand. Ryo can spend money on items such as capsule toys or 1980s arcade games including Hang-On, After Burner, Space Harrier and Out Run. The Dreamcast version allows the player to import their save data from the first Shenmue, transferring money, items and martial arts moves.

== Plot ==
Ren (left), Ryo (center) and Joy (right)

In 1987, the teenage martial artist Ryo Hazuki arrives from Japan in Wan Chai, Hong Kong, on the trail of his father's killer, Lan Di, of the criminal Chi You Men organization. He searches for Master Lishao Tao, the only link to the whereabouts of Yuanda Zhu, a martial arts expert who sent Ryo's father a letter warning him of Lan Di's intentions. When Ryo finds Tao, whose real name is Xiuying Hong, she refuses to help, considering his quest for vengeance reckless. The two part ways, but Xiuying continues to monitor Ryo's progress.

Ryo encounters Wuying Ren, the wily leader of a street gang. Ren decides to help Ryo after deciding there may be money to be made in Ryo's mysterious phoenix mirror; Lan Di took the second mirror, the dragon mirror, when he killed Ryo's father. Wong, a street boy who admires Ren, and Joy, a free-spirited motorcyclist, assist Ryo in his journey.

Ren informs Ryo that Zhu is hiding from the Chi You Men in Kowloon Walled City, a crime-ridden enclave of Hong Kong. They locate Zhu there but are ambushed by the criminal Yellow Head organization and Zhu is kidnapped. Ryo and his allies infiltrate the Yellow Head headquarters, but Wong and Joy are captured. Ryo defeats a powerful martial artist and rescues Joy. On the rooftop of the Yellow Head building, Ryo rescues Wong and Zhu from the Yellow Head leader, Dou Niu, as Lan Di departs by helicopter.

At Ren's hideout, Zhu reveals that Lan Di killed Ryo's father because he believes Iwao killed his own father. He also reveals that the mirrors will lead to the resurrection of the Qing dynasty, the last imperial dynasty of China. Zhu advises Ryo to continue his search in Bailu Village in Guilin, where he says Lan Di is also heading.

In the mountains of Guilin, Ryo rescues a girl, Shenhua Ling, after she dives into a river to rescue a deer. Shenhua's family is connected to the legacy of the mirrors, and she seems to have magical abilities. They walk through the mountains to her village. At Shenhua's family home, a tree named Shenmue (Chinese for "sedge tree") is in bloom; she explains that her name means "flower of the Shenmue tree". The pair go to a stone quarry on the village outskirts to meet Shenhua's father, but he is missing. They discover a cryptic note and sword; Ryo combines the sword with the phoenix mirror, triggering a device that reveals a large mural of the dragon and phoenix mirrors.

== Development ==
Shenmue II was developed by Sega AM2 and directed by Yu Suzuki. Much of the game was developed in tandem with the first Shenmue, which was the most expensive video game ever developed at the time and was reported to have cost Sega $70 million; in 2011, Suzuki said the figure was closer to $47 million including marketing. Though Shenmue was one of the highest-selling Dreamcast games, its costly development made profit impossible. Sega planned to continue the series to recoup its investment. According to IGN, Shenmue II was completed for "a much more reasonable sum".

== Release ==
Shenmue II was published by Sega for Dreamcast on September 6, 2001 in Japan and on November 30, 2001 in Europe. The first Japanese editions included Virtua Fighter 4 Passport, promoting Sega AM2's fighting game Virtua Fighter 4.

The Dreamcast version was not released in North America, where Microsoft Game Studios secured console exclusivity for Shenmue II on Xbox in October 2001. The Xbox version was distributed and marketed by Microsoft and released in North America on October 29, 2002, and in Europe on March 21, 2003. It features an additional camera mode, optional filter effects, improved frame rate and lighting, and English-language voice acting. It also contains a DVD of Shenmue: The Movie, a compilation film comprising cutscenes from the original Shenmue that was released in Japanese theaters. AM2 changed a gay male character to a woman as they were concerned he would be poorly received outside Japan. An anime adaptation of the first two Shenmue games premiered on February 6, 2022.

Sega released high-definition ports of Shenmue and Shenmue II for Windows, Xbox One, and the PlayStation 4 on 21 August 2018. They include updated graphics and control options, improved user interfaces and Japanese and English voices.

== Sales ==
In Japan, Shenmue II had sold 124,190 copies by the end of 2001, making it the 92nd-highest-selling new game. Japanese sales reached 140,829 copies by June 2002. Xbox sales were weak; according to IGN, by this point the graphics appeared dated and "consumers shrugged off the masterpiece as simply irrelevant". The poor financial return on Shenmue and Shenmue II contributed to the failure of the Dreamcast and Sega's financial problems.

== Reception ==
Reception

Aggregate scores
Aggregator	Score
GameRankings	DC: 90% XB: 82%
Metacritic	XB: 80/100

Review scores
Publication	Score
Edge	DC: 8/10
Eurogamer	DC: 8/10; XB: 6/10
Famitsu	DC: 8/10, 8/10, 8/10, 8/10
G4	XB: 5/5
Game Informer	XB: 8/10
GamePro	XB:4.5/5
GameSpot	DC: 8.7/10
GameSpy	DC: 9/10
IGN	XB: 8.3/10
PALGN	XB: 9/10
Gaming Age	DC: A
Kikizo	XB: 9/10
Official Dreamcast Magazine (UK)	DC: 94%
RPGamer	DC: 9/10
Xbox World	XB: 8.5/10

Reviewing the Dreamcast version, GameSpot found that Shenmue II greatly improved on Shenmue and refined "nearly every aspect", with an "epic feel". Tom Bramwell of Eurogamer felt it was an effective swan song for the Dreamcast, which it took to "the very brink of its capabilities". GamesRadar felt that, like the first game, Shenmue II had some uninteresting elements, but praised the expanded scale and action. Edge criticized the "unwieldy" controls, "stilted" introduction and occasional frame rate slowdown, but found the narrative "enthralling and surprising", and wrote: "Shenmue II demands a huge investment of time and patience, but those willing to make the effort will be rewarded with a scintillating experience."

Reviewing the Xbox version, IGN praised the story and soundtrack but criticized the English-language voice acting and found the graphics lacking compared to other Xbox games. Matt Keller of PALGN also criticized the English-language acting, but concluded: "Shenmue II is a great example of the fusion of two different genres, and it provides an excellent, engrossing narrative to complement the excellent gameplay." Eurogamer's Martin Taylor criticized the port as "lazy", and concluded: "Your perseverance with the sluggish pacing can be rewarding, but Shenmue II consistently proves itself an ageing game with ageing looks." GamePro wrote: "Shenmue II is an extremely satisfying yarn that breaks into new visual and gameplay territory. The Xbox needed a game like this." It was nominated for GameSpot's annual "Best Story on Xbox" award, but lost to Dead to Rights.

Shenmue II was voted the tenth-best game of all time by IGN readers in 2008. In 2013, Den of Geek named Shenmue and Shenmue II the best Dreamcast games, and in 2014 Empire ranked Shenmue II the 51st-best game of all time.

== Sequel ==
Following the commercial failure of Shenmue and Shenmue II, Sega canceled Shenmue III and Suzuki was not entrusted with a large-budget project again. In 2011, Suzuki left Sega to focus on his development studio, Ys Net. In June 2015, he launched a successful Kickstarter crowdfunding campaign to develop Shenmue III with Ys Net for the PlayStation 4 and Windows, having licensed the rights from Sega. It was released in November 2019.
