= Urawa Nishi High School =

High school in Saitama, Japan

Coordinates: 35°53′23.4″N 139°39′13.9″E

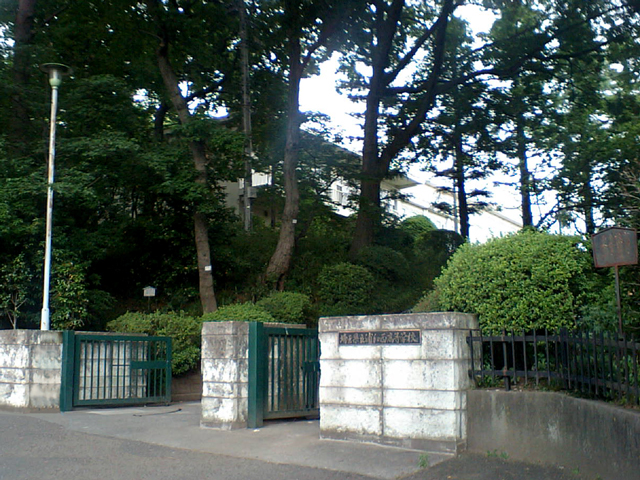
Picture showing the front gate of Urawanishi High School.

Saitama Prefectural Urawa Nishi High School (埼玉県立浦和西高等学校, Saitama Kenritsu Urawanishi Kōtō Gakkō), often shortened to Nishikō (西高) is a public high school in Saitama City, Saitama Prefecture, Japan. It is one of the few public schools in the prefecture that does not have a school uniform.

Until the 1970s, the school enjoyed prestigious position after Urawa High School and Urawa Ichijo High School. During the 80s and 90s, it was known as one of the best public schools and sent its alumni to the best universities in Japan, such as Tokyo University. Many applicants to the school are attracted by the no-school-uniform policy and by the liberal atmosphere that encourages students' independence.

== Location ==
The school is located in Urawa-ku, Saitama City and situated in a quiet residential area behind the idyllic scene of Minuma. The closest train station, JR Yono Station, is within 20 minutes walking distance, 1.7 kilometers.

== History ==
In 1934, Urawanishi High School was founded as a female school called Urawa Daini Kōtō Jogakkō (浦和第二高等女学校). The school changed its name to Urawa Daini Joshi Kōtō Gakkō (浦和第二女子高等学校) in 1948. In 1950, Educational Reform abolished the prior policy and restarted the school as a coed institution with the current school name, Urawanishi High School. During this period, the institution was located at the western part of Urawa-ku (former Urawa City). In 1956, the school moved to its current site, but did not change its name (which literally means Urawa Western High School), although it no longer reflected its location.

== Extracurricular activities ==
Urawanishi's 22 varsity athletic teams and 23 other clubs offer a wide range of opportunities for extracurricular activities. In the past, the school was known for its Soccer Team, which won the national title twice in 1956 and 1965. In recent years, Japanese Archery Team and Basketball Team have won many titles at the prefectural and regional levels.

== Notable alumni ==
- Asa Higuchi, manga artist
- Akira Nishino, soccer player
- Ryozo Suzuki, soccer player
- Sakura Tsukuba, manga artist
- Sumika Yamamoto, manga artist
- Toshiaki Imai, soccer player
