= Asa Higuchi =

Japanese manga artist

- Born: May 17, 1970 (age 56) Urawa, Saitama, Japan
- Area: Manga artist
- Notable works: Big Windup!
- Awards: 10th Tezuka Osamu Cultural Prize for best creative work — Big Windup!; 31st Kodansha Manga Award for general manga — Big Windup!

Asa Higuchi (Japanese: ひぐち アサ, Hepburn: Higuchi Asa; born May 17, 1970) is a Japanese manga artist, born in Urawa, Saitama Prefecture (now part of Saitama City). She graduated from Saitama Prefecture's prestigious Urawanishi High School and Hosei University's department of psychology, with a major in sports psychology. During her high school days, she was a member of her school's softball team, which would go on to be an inspiration in her work Big Windup! as well as her high school which is featured in detail (the school now advertising the manga and anime on their website).

In 1998, Higuchi won noted seinen manga magazine Monthly Afternoon's Shiki competition with her work Yuku Tokoro. It was noted for the unique relationships shared by its characters and was subsequently published in the August issue of the magazine, thus marking her debut as a manga artist. She is currently working on Big Windup!, which has spanned 37 volumes to date and is serialized in Monthly Afternoon. It won the 10th Tezuka Osamu Cultural Prize for best creative work in 2006, and the 31st Kodansha Manga Award for general manga in 2007.

== Works ==
- Yuku Tokoro (1998)
- Kazoku no Sore Kara (2000, serialized in Monthly Afternoon, Kodansha)
- Yasashii Watashi (2001–2002, serialized in Monthly Afternoon, Kodansha)
- Big Windup! (2003–present, serialized in Monthly Afternoon, Kodansha)
