= List of Oricon number-one manga of 2008 =

A chart with the best selling manga in Japan is published weekly by Oricon. This list includes the manga that reached the number one place on that chart in 2008.

== Chart history ==
Week	Date	Title	Author	Publisher	Copies	Reference
12	March 24–30	Kimi ni Todoke, 6	Karuho Shiina	Shueisha	347,826	
13	March 31–April 6	Bleach, 33	Tite Kubo	Shueisha	430,081	
14	April 7–13	Ouran High School Host Club, 12	Bisco Hatori	Hakusensha	205,298	
15	April 14–20	Hayate the Combat Butler, 15	Kenjiro Hata	Shogakukan	147,645	
16	April 21–27	High School Debut, 11	Kazune Kawahara	Shueisha	111,276	
17	April 28–May 4	Naruto, 42	Masashi Kishimoto	Shueisha	505,506	
18	May 5–11	Naruto, 42	Masashi Kishimoto	Shueisha	264,862	
19	May 12–18	Nana, 19	Ai Yazawa	Shueisha	787,219	
20	May 19–25	Nana, 19	Ai Yazawa	Shueisha	358,579	
21	May 26–June 1	Black Butler, 4	Yana Toboso	Square Enix	240,654	
22	June 2–8	One Piece, 50	Eiichiro Oda	Shueisha	1,074,745	
23	June 9–15	One Piece, 50	Eiichiro Oda	Shueisha	231,919	
24	June 16–22	Zatch Bell!, 33	Makoto Raiku	Shogakukan	181,234	
25	June 23–29	Boys Over Flowers, 37	Yoko Kamio	Shueisha	361,497	
26	June 30–July 6	Bleach, 34	Tite Kubo	Shueisha	425,366	
27	July 7–13	Bleach, 34	Tite Kubo	Shueisha	228,406	
28	July 14–20	Tsubasa: Reservoir Chronicle, 24	Clamp	Kodansha	167,315	
29	July 21–27	Kimi ni Todoke, 7	Karuho Shiina	Shueisha	220,995	
30	July 28-August 3	Pluto, 6	Naoki Urasawa	Shogakukan	313,694	
31	August 4–10	Naruto, 43	Masashi Kishimoto	Shueisha	735,206	
32	August 11–17	Nodame Cantabile, 21	Tomoko Ninomiya	Kodansha	734,890	
33	August 18–24	Fullmetal Alchemist, 20	Hiromu Arakawa	Square Enix	589,556	
34	August 25–31	Yotsuba&!, 8	Kiyohiko Azuma	ASCII Media Works	280,118	
35	September 1–7	One Piece, 51	Eiichiro Oda	Shueisha	1,029,249	
36	September 8–14	Nana, 20	Ai Yazawa	Shueisha	653,967	
37	September 15–21	Nana, 20	Ai Yazawa	Shueisha	408,717	
38	September 22–28	Nana, 20	Ai Yazawa	Shueisha	156,210	
39	September 29–October 5	Hunter × Hunter, 26	Yoshihiro Togashi	Shueisha	487,403	
40	October 6–12	Hunter × Hunter, 26	Yoshihiro Togashi	Shueisha	200,640	
41	October 13–19	Hayate the Combat Butler, 17	Kenjiro Hata	Shogakukan	152,617	
42	October 20–26	Big Windup!, 11	Asa Higuchi	Kodansha	245,740	
43	October 27–November 2	Real, 8	Takehiko Inoue	Shueisha	288,970	
44	November 3–9	Naruto, 44	Masashi Kishimoto	Shueisha	620,283	
45	November 10–16	Detective Conan, 63	Gosho Aoyama	Shogakukan	154,811	
46	November 17–23	Tsubasa: Reservoir Chronicle, 25	Clamp	Kodansha	196,094	
47	November 24–30	Kimi ni Todoke, 8	Karuho Shiina	Shueisha	372,293	
48	December 1–7	One Piece, 52	Eiichiro Oda	Shueisha	1,045,937	
49	December 8–14	One Piece, 52	Eiichiro Oda	Shueisha	275,035	
50	December 15–21	Fairy Tail, 13	Hiro Mashima	Kodansha	166,509	
51	December 22-January 4	Fullmetal Alchemist, 21	Hiromu Arakawa	Square Enix	825,026	
