= List of Nana chapters =

The cover of the first Nana volume as published by Shueisha in Japan on May 15, 2000

The chapters of Nana are written and illustrated by Ai Yazawa. Nana premiered in the Japanese manga magazine Cookie in 2000 where it ran until June 2009, when the series was put on hiatus because of Yazawa's illness. Yazawa returned from hospital in early April 2010, though had not specified when or if she will resume the manga. Yazawa published a two-page chapter of "Junko's Room", a side story about a friend of one of the two main characters, in the March 2013 issue of Cookie. This is the first manga she has published since her 2009 illness. The chapters have been collected and published in 21 tankōbon volumes in Japan by Shueisha.

Nana is licensed for English-language release in North America by Viz Media. It was serialized in Viz's manga anthology Shojo Beat, from July 2005 to August 2007. The series continued publication in book form, with all 21 volumes released as of July 6, 2010. Madman Entertainment distributes the series in New Zealand and Australia.

== Volumes ==
No.	Original release date	Original ISBN	English release date	English ISBN
1	May 15, 2000	4-08-856209-7	December 6, 2005	978-1-4215-0108-6
"Nana – Nana Komatsu"; "Nana – Nana Osaki"
Nana Komatsu, during her final year of high school in 1999, ends an affair with married salaryman Takashi Asano after he transfers to Tokyo. She enrolls at a local art college with friend Junko Saotome, where they meet Kyosuke Takakura and Shoji Endo. Initially resisting her feelings for Shoji despite mutual attraction, Komatsu reconsiders when her friends plan to move to Tokyo for university. After failing her college entrance exams, she encounters Takashi during a Tokyo visit and achieves closure. When Shoji confesses his feelings, Komatsu vows to establish herself financially before reuniting with him in Tokyo. In March 1999, Nana Osaki celebrates a successful concert with her band Blast, featuring bassist Ren Honjo, guitarist Nobuo "Nobu" Terashima, and drummer Yasushi "Yasu" Takagi. However, Ren plans to relocate to Tokyo and join a new band, creating tension in his romantic relationship with Osaki. After an emotional farewell, Osaki continues leading Blast before pursuing her music career in Tokyo two years later.
2	December 11, 2000	4-08-856248-8	February 7, 2006	978-1-4215-0378-3
Chapters 1–4
In March 2000, 19-year-old Nana K. abruptly resigns from her video rental position upon learning her long-distance boyfriend Shoji has passed his Tokyo university entrance examinations. She immediately departs for Tokyo, boarding an overnight train where she encounters Nana O. Discovering they share the same name, age, and destination, the two women form an acquaintance. After initially separating at the station, they coincidentally reunite while apartment hunting and decide to share unit 707 (pronounced "nana" in Japanese) to reduce living expenses. As Komatsu adjusts to life in Tokyo with Shoji, she gradually becomes acquainted with Osaki's world.
3	May 15, 2001	4-08-856338-7	June 6, 2006	978-1-4215-0479-7
Chapters 5–8
Osaki reluctantly agrees to reform Blast as a band rather than pursue a solo career, following persuasion from Yasu. The group begins searching for new members, posting flyers that attract bassist Shinichi Okazaki, who provides access to an affordable recording studio after neighbors complain about noise. Though initially skeptical of Shinichi's youthful appearance and family situation, Osaki accepts him into the band after an impressive audition, challenging him to surpass Ren's musical skill. Meanwhile, Komatsu (nicknamed "Hachi" for her dog-like loyalty) faces financial struggles when her workplace closes. Her boyfriend Shoji grows increasingly acquainted with his coworker Sachiko Kawamura. The band's reunion progresses when Blast's original drummer Yasushi Takagi visits apartment 707 to reclaim his position.
4	December 10, 2001	4-08-856338-7	October 3, 2006	978-1-4215-0480-3
Chapters 9–12
Hachi witnesses Shoji embracing coworker Sachiko and silently retreats, assuming their relationship has ended. Seeking distraction, she recalls owning tickets for a Trapnest concert and searches for a companion after her original plans with Shoji collapse. Meanwhile, Blast performs their first Tokyo concert where they meet longtime fan Misato Uehara. Nana invites Misato to visit Tokyo Disneyland, creating tension with Hachi who feels her personal space is being invaded. Through interactions with Misato and Nobu, Hachi discovers the identity of Blast's former bassist and his connection to Nana. Motivated by this revelation, Hachi convinces Nana to attend the Trapnest concert, hoping the front-row seats will facilitate a reunion between Nana and Ren. Though hesitant, Nana ultimately agrees. Concurrently, Yasu receives an unexpected late-night visit from an old acquaintance.
5	May 15, 2002	4-08-856377-8	February 6, 2007	978-1-4215-1019-4
Chapters 13–16
Ren contacts Yasu in distress after encountering Nana unexpectedly. Yasu provides Hachi's contact information, encouraging Ren to reconcile rather than dwell on past regrets. When Nana discovers this intervention, she initially protests but ultimately agrees to meet Ren at his hotel. Their emotional reunion results in a renewed relationship with the understanding that Nana's music career remains her priority. The reconciliation energizes Blast, with Nana implementing stricter rehearsal schedules. A gathering at apartment 707 brings together members of Blast and Trapnest, including guitarist Takumi Ichinose who surprises Hachi. During the meeting, Yasu, Ren and Takumi share childhood stories that reveal previously unknown connections between the groups. Meanwhile, Hachi loses her editing job after repeated professional missteps and unexpectedly seeks comfort with Takumi. When other Trapnest members learn about the gathering, Reira questions Yasu's decision to pursue music over his legal career, while Ren remains contemplative.
6	September 13, 2002	4-08-856406-5	June 5, 2007	978-1-4215-1020-0
Chapters 17–20
As Trapnest's Trigger Tour concludes, Hachi anxiously awaits contact from Takumi after two months of silence. Blast members (excluding Nana Osaki) attend the final concert and visit backstage, where Shin and Nobu discover Hachi's involvement with Takumi. Yasu declines to join the backstage visit. At apartment 707, Nana dines with a despondent Hachi when Takumi unexpectedly arrives. Distressed by the encounter and what she perceives as losing loved ones to Trapnest, Nana flees to Yasu before spending the night with Ren, ultimately accepting his proposal to live together. Meanwhile, Nobu confesses his feelings to Hachi following a confrontation at Trapnest's staff party, while Shin acquires Reira Serizawa as a new client for his nocturnal activities. That evening, Gaia Records contacts Yasu after reviewing Blast's demo recording and live performance, expressing interest in the band.
7	October 15, 2002	4-08-856413-8	October 2, 2007	978-1-4215-1021-7
Chapters 21–24
Blast performs their third Tokyo concert before a capacity audience that includes a Gaia Records executive. While the band meets with label representatives, Hachi spends the evening with Takumi. Simultaneously, Reira contacts Shinichi to alleviate her loneliness. At Blast's celebration party, Hachi and Nobu publicly declare their relationship, receiving varied reactions from their friends. Their announcement is followed by an unsuccessful termination of Hachi's relationship with Takumi, resulting in conflict. During the gathering, Shin faces questions from bandmates about his undisclosed background and involvement in illicit activities. Meanwhile, Trapnest encounters increasing difficulties with paparazzi attention.
8	May 15, 2003	4-08-856464-2	January 1, 2008	978-1-4215-1539-7
Chapters 25–28
Hachi experiences morning sickness at work and confirms her pregnancy during a medical examination. Meanwhile, Blast struggles to prepare for their debut under Gaia Records, facing skepticism from executives about their punk rock style's commercial viability. Takumi unexpectedly visits Hachi after failed summer attempts to contact her. She reveals both her relationship with Nobu and her decision to terminate the pregnancy. Takumi contacts Nobu to discuss Hachi's situation, while Nana overhears and leaves distraught. Nobu confronts Hachi but receives no clear response about their future. Meanwhile, Reira struggles to compose lyrics for Ren's new song, while Shin adjusts to professional music career demands. During their collaboration, Shin displays uncharacteristic sincerity. Hachi makes her final decision while alone with Takumi.
9	November 14, 2003	4-08-856506-1	March 4, 2008	978-1-4215-1745-2
Chapters 29–32; Bonus Story: "Naoki"
Nana returns to apartment 707 intending to support Hachi, only to find Takumi announcing his marriage to Hachi and warning about paparazzi following Ren. Hachi silently accompanies Takumi to her room while Nana, distraught, leaves for Ren's residence after breaking their symbolic shared glassware. During Trapnest's recording session, Takumi reveals his marriage plans, prompting Reira to abruptly depart. Ren alerts Reira's manager while Takumi postpones recording. Reira contacts Shin and subsequently meets with Yasu for support. Meanwhile, Ren confronts Takumi about his treatment of Reira before Yasu requests a discussion with Takumi. At tabloid magazine Search, editor Kudou grows frustrated with the unsuccessful surveillance of Ren and Nana. He redirects efforts to investigate their hometowns, aiming to create conflict between Blast and Trapnest. Hachi adapts to her new domestic life under Takumi's direction, gradually distancing herself from former friends and leaving apartment 707 solely to Nana.
10	March 15, 2004	4-08-856528-2	May 6, 2008	978-1-4215-1746-9
Chapters 33–36
Search publishes unauthorized photographs of Ren and Nana, unexpectedly launching Blast's media debut. In response, Cookie Music, the agency of Trapnest, relocates the band's album cover shoot to London to avoid media scrutiny in Japan. Meanwhile, Gaia Records capitalizes on the publicity by scheduling Blast's debut release for October 31—the same date as Trapnest's new album launch.
11	August 11, 2004	4-08-856560-6	July 1, 2008	978-1-4215-1747-6
Chapters 37–41
Blast engages in rigorous preparations for their debut, including promotional guerrilla concerts. Nana experiences her first hyperventilation episode due to mounting pressures, receiving assistance from labelmate Miu Shinoda. Meanwhile, Ren's personal struggles resurface through substance use, prompting intervention from Reira and Yasu. He ultimately decides to act on Yasu's advice regarding his personal life. Reira maintains regular correspondence with Shin during their separation, finding solace in their communication. In Japan, Takumi and Hachi gradually formalize their marital relationship. The media fuels a rivalry narrative by arranging Blast's first joint interview with Trapnest on a live television program. This development causes concern at Cookie Music, who view Blast as emerging competition.
12	March 15, 2005	4-08-856599-1	September 2, 2008	978-1-4215-1879-4
Chapters 42–45
Gaia Records and Cookie Music collaborate to increase record sales, organizing a press conference where Nana and Ren announce their wedding shortly after Blast's debut. Cookie Music extends an invitation to Blast for a joint birthday celebration honoring Shin and Reira. Though initially hesitant about encountering Takumi, the band members accept after witnessing Shin's enthusiasm for his first birthday party. Reira personally invites Hachi to attend the event. In subsequent years, Hachi observes the annual Tamagawa fireworks festival from apartment 707 with her daughter Satsuki, joined by Yasu, Nobu, and Shin for the occasion.
13	August 12, 2005	4-08-856633-5	November 4, 2008	978-1-4215-1880-0
Chapters 46–49
Hachi attends Reira and Shin's birthday party with Naoki Fujieda—Trapnest's drummer—despite Takumi's objections. Following disputes mediated by Yasu, she obtains permission to remain and socializes with Blast members. Meanwhile, Nobu, disillusioned by unreciprocated affections, pursues an attraction to Yuri Kousaka and resolves to progress emotionally. Takumi confronts Shin regarding his inappropriate relationship with Reira, emphasizing the professional and personal risks involved. He subsequently persuades Hachi to counsel Shin on the matter.
14	December 15, 2005	4-08-856660-2	January 6, 2009	978-1-4215-1972-2
Chapters 50–53
As Blast's popularity grows, longtime fans arrive in Tokyo to organize fan activities. One familiar name particularly attracts Nana's attention. The punk band surpasses Trapnest in music charts while the latter group takes a rare day off—Takumi remains at home with his fiancée, while Ren and Reira visit their hometown to escape professional pressures. Meanwhile, Yasu supports Miu when she faces management harassment after Yuri Kousaka abandons her professional commitments again. Nobu uses this time to strengthen his relationship with Yuri. Despite shifting dynamics between the bands, Search continues investigating their connections, ultimately delivering an unwelcome revelation to Nana.
15	March 15, 2006	4-08-856676-9	March 3, 2009	978-14215-2374-3
Chapters 54–57
Yasu and Takumi discuss strategies to counter Search's upcoming exposé, with Takumi ultimately negotiating to replace it with news of his wedding. This arrangement allows Ren and Reira to address their personal complications—Reira terminates her relationship with Shin to safeguard her career, while Ren contends with Nana's concerns about their incompatible futures. In later years, Hachi and her daughter Satsuki receive an unexpected visit from Takumi at their home.
16	September 12, 2006	4-08-856707-2	May 5, 2009	978-1-4215-2375-0
Chapters 58–61; Bonus Story: "Nobu"
Trapnest departs for a month-long recording session in London while Blast prepares for a Christmas Eve concert with select fans. When Mai Tsuzuki (using the pseudonym Misato) learns of Misato Uehara's potential attendance, she enlists Miu Shinoda to prevent Uehara from approaching Nana, alerting Yasu to the situation. Blast's declining chart performance concerns songwriter Nobu as producers repeatedly reject his work. Meanwhile, Search intensifies efforts to generate publicity by investigating Nana's biological mother. Years later, photographer Kurada observes a blonde, lotus-tattooed singer performing at London's Agorad bar. Reviewing photographs of the engagement-ring-wearing performer in his hotel room, he informs editor Kudou by telephone that "Nana of Blast" no longer exists.
17	March 15, 2007	978-4-08-856734-1	July 7, 2009	978-1421523767
Chapters 62–65
Following Search exposé about Nana's biological mother, Misuzu Uehara, her associates attempt to shield the singer. Hachi temporarily moves in with Nana until Ren's return, while Yasu, Shion and Mai conceal the disappearance of Nana's half-sister Misato Uehara and her family. Amid the turmoil, Blast releases their debut album Black Spot. Years later, Hachi visits apartment 707 during the Christmas season, where Shin awaits her. While reviewing mail, she discovers startling photographs of Nana sent anonymously.
18	September 14, 2007	978-4-08-856774-7	September 1, 2009	978-1421526706
Chapters 66–69; Bonus Story: "Takumi"
Blast prepares for their national tour debut at Yokohama Arena. While Nana and Nobu approach the tour with enthusiasm, Shin struggles with his recent breakup, displaying erratic behavior that concerns Yasu. The day before the opening performance, authorities arrest Shin for drug possession at his associate Ryoko's residence. Facing cancellation, Nana requests Ren assume bassist duties, but he declines. Gaia Records subsequently suspends Blast's activities and offers Nana a solo contract. Years later, Hachi shares recently received photographs and recordings of Nana with Nobu and Yasu, providing evidence of her survival. During their return journey, Shin and Yasu speculate about the anonymous sender's identity and motivations.
19	May 15, 2008	978-4-08-856816-4	November 3, 2009	978-1421526713
Chapters 70–73
On Valentine's Day, Reira struggles with her unrequited feelings for Takumi, affecting her professional performance. Meanwhile, Hachi attempts unsuccessfully to reconcile Ren and Nana. Ren's substance abuse issues become increasingly apparent to colleagues who attempt various interventions. Shin completes his probation period early but isolates himself from bandmates out of remorse. He declines Takumi's request to comfort Reira, prompting Takumi to fulfill Reira's longstanding romantic desire himself. Years later, Hachi considers withdrawing her divorce petition. When Takumi calls from London to report finding the bar she mentioned, she inquires about Ren's wellbeing. In another location, Reira performs one of Ren's compositions in a park, smiling at a light-haired boy after finishing the song.
20	September 12, 2008	978-4-08-856842-3	January 5, 2010	978-1421530758
Chapters 74–77
While looking for babies name, Ren suggests the name "Satsuki" to Hachi, reflecting his preference for floral names like his own. Following this visit, he attempts to resign from Trapnest, but Takumi refuses. Concerned for Ren's wellbeing, Reira departs unexpectedly, prompting the label to suspend activities and grant the guitarist leave. On the eve of Nana's birthday, Ren travels to retrieve Reira despite Hachi's warnings about his condition. Pursued by paparazzi in snowy conditions, he crashes his vehicle after experiencing a hallucination of Nana triggered by a radio mention of Blast. Years later in London, Takumi and his young son, Ren, are visited by Naoki, who proposes investigating whether the mysterious singer is indeed Nana. Takumi reveals Reira has resumed singing, but only when accompanied by Ren's guitar compositions. In a park, Reira attempts unsuccessfully to communicate with Ren's memory.
21	March 13, 2009	978-4-08-856876-8	July 6, 2010	978-1421533087
Chapters 78–80
Kudou dispatches Kurada to monitor Ren outside his former residence. When news of Ren's accident reaches them, Takumi, Hachi, Miu, and Blast members travel to his hometown while Yasu and Mai inform Nana in Osaka before media reports can. Naoki retrieves Reira, who becomes distraught after Shin's blunt remarks at the funeral. Yasu escorts Nana to the wake, where she remains unresponsive throughout the ceremony. She withdraws when receiving Ren's recovered birthday gift from his assistant. Years later, Yasu, Miu, Hachi, and Satsuki observe a seaside memorial before joining Nobu for a birthday celebration at the Terashima's ryokan.

== Uncollected chapters ==
In June 2009, Ai Yazawa announced a hiatus for health reasons, putting the series on hold. In March 2009, Shueisha published the latest tankōbon volume while its monthly magazine, Cookie, released 4 additional chapters until July 2009 and later announced Yazawa's hiatus in their August issue. Those chapters have not been collected in a volume yet, nor officially translated and published outside of Japan for international audiences.

Chapter	Release date
81	April 2009
Hachi, Blast and their staff head back to their dorm in Tokyo, now surrounded by paparazzi. Takumi leaves for Akasaka for work and to give his wife some time and space to cater to Nana. During a stakeout with Miyake near Ren's burial place, Kurada confides his feelings on finding Ren's body.
82	May 2009
Three weeks after Ren's death, Nana still hasn't spoken a word since her last hyperventilation crisis and refuses to go to any places related to Ren's passing, worring her friends. Yuri grows more and more irritated at Hachi's frequent visits to Gaia's dorm. Nobu opens up for the first time about his last conversation with Ren to Hachi, which brings them to the subject of Hachi's unborn child, a first since their breakup, almost a year ago. Back in Ren's hometown, in an hospital, Takumi is trying to encourage a bedridden Reira to eat. She receives the visit of Naoki and Yasu who are surprised to learn that she does not seem to remember Ren's death.
83	June 2009
Hachi and Nobu comfort each other, which brings back old feelings, with Nana and Shin eavesdropping in the room next door. Worried at the prolonged silence, Nana runs to her friend's rescue and breaks her silence. Yasu takes the opportunity to visit his mother who's being taken care of by Shion. The fanclub president informs him that she recently talked to the Uehara family who would like to meet Nana, particularly her estranged mother.
84	July 2009
Nana finds some motivation to sing again, starting with a passionate karaoke session. Yasu comes home sooner than planned to talk to Nana as soon as possible, but decides to postpone when he notices her sudden distress. Hachi attempts to work on her marriage and learns more about Reira and Takumi's history from Shin.
