= List of Fullmetal Alchemist chapters =

Cover of the first tankōbon for Fullmetal Alchemist, released in Japan by Square Enix on January 22, 2002

The Japanese manga Fullmetal Alchemist was written and illustrated by Hiromu Arakawa. It has been serialized in Square Enix's Monthly Shōnen Gangan since its August 2001 issue (published on July 12, 2001) and concluded on its July 2010 issue (published in June 2010) with a total of 108 chapters. The plot follows the adventures of two alchemist brothers named Edward and Alphonse Elric. They are striving to find the legendary Philosopher's Stone so that they may recover parts of their bodies that they lost in an attempt to bring their mother back to life. Therefore, Edward joins the state military and discovers that several members of the military are also attempting to get the stone.

Square Enix collected the chapters in tankōbon form. The first volume was released on January 22, 2002, and the last, volume 27, was released on November 22, 2010. A few chapters have been rereleased in Japan in two "Extra number" magazines and Fullmetal Alchemist: The First Attack, which features the first nine chapters of the manga as well as other side stories. On July 22, 2011, Square Enix started republishing the series in kanzenban format. Viz Media is releasing English language editions of the manga in North America. The first volume was released on May 3, 2005, and the last one, was officially released on December 20, 2011. On June 7, 2011, Viz started publishing the series in omnibus format, featuring three volumes in one.

The animation studio Bones adapted the manga into two separate animated adaptations. The first ran in October 2003 for 51 episodes with changes made from the manga and it was followed by a film sequel in 2005. In April 2009, Bones started running a new 64 episode anime adaptation directly based on the manga entitled Fullmetal Alchemist: Brotherhood for the North American release.

== Volumes ==
| No. | Original release date | Original ISBN | English release date | English ISBN |
|---|---|---|---|---|
| 01 | January 22, 2002 | 978-4-7575-0620-6 | May 3, 2005 | 978-1-59116-920-8 |
001. "The Two Alchemists" (二人の錬金術師, Futari no Renkinjutsushi); 002. "The Price of Life" (命の代価, Inochi no Daika); 003. "The Mining Town" (炭鉱の街, Tankō no Machi); 004. "Battle on the Train" (車上の戦い, Shajō no Tatakai)
In the country of Amestris, Edward Elric and his younger brother Alphonse live in the rural town of Resembool with their mother Trisha while self-learning alchemy at a young age. When the brothers commit the taboo act of Human Transmutation to resurrect Trisha after she dies of illness, it backfires and they suffer the consequences via the Law of Equivalent Exchange: Edward loses his left leg, while Alphonse is dragged into the Gate of Truth. Edward then sacrifices his right arm to save his brother's soul and bind it to a suit of armor via a blood seal, later replacing his missing limbs with "automail" prosthetics. Edward later became a State Alchemist with the title "Fullmetal Alchemist", joining the military so he and Al can find the legendary philosopher's stone which could repair their bodies. Four years later, the brothers' search brings them to Liore where they expose a cultist named Father Cornello, whom they believe is using a philosopher's stone to recruit the people of Liore. But the brothers reach a dead end and leave as the exposed Cornello is killed off by a woman named Lust. On their way back to East City, the Elrics are side -tracked with aiding the civilians of Youswell,who are being overtaxed by the corrupt Lieutenant Yoki and later get got up in a train hijacking by terrorists whose leader gets dispatched by Edward's superior Colonel Roy Mustang.
| 02 | May 22, 2002 | 978-4-7575-0699-2 | July 5, 2005 | 978-1-59116-923-9 |
005. "The Alchemist's Suffering" (錬金術師の苦悩, Renkinjutsushi no Kunō); 006. "The Right Hand of Destruction" (破壊の右手, Hakai no Migite); 007. "After the Rain" (雨の後, Ame no Ato); 008. "The Road of Hope" (希望の道, Kibō no Michi)
After the Elric Brothers reach East City, Mustang introduces them to Shou Tucker, a bio-alchemy authority who obtained his State Alchemist credentials by creating a talking chimera that starved itself to death. But the brothers learn the horrible truth behind Tucker's creation when his obsession to keep his credentials forces him to merge his daughter Nina with the family dog Alexander into another talking chimera. Following Tucker's arrest, both he and the chimera are killed by a scarred mass murderer who is being investigated by Mustang's friend Lieutenant Colonel Maes Hughes. The brothers are nearly killed by the man named "Scar", revealed to be an Ishvalan targeting State Alchemists for their role in nearly wiping out his people in the Ishval civil war. The Elrics decide to return to Resembool for repairs, accompanied by fellow alchemist Major Alex Louis Armstrong. They get sidetracked while accidentally running into Dr. Tim Marcoh, a former State Alchemist who went into hiding after working as a doctor during the Ishvalan War. Though Marcoh refuses to reveal the process of a Philosopher's Stone's creation, he does point the brothers to his research notes in Central before being found by Lust, whose group caused Liore to descend into chaos.
| 03 | September 21, 2002 | 978-4-7575-0791-3 | September 6, 2005 | 978-1-59116-925-3 |
009. "A Home with a Family Waiting" (家族の待つ家, Kazoku no Matsu Ie); 010. "The Philosopher's Stone" (賢者の石, Kenja no Ishi); 011. "The Two Guardians" (二人の守護者, Futari no Shugosha); 012. "The Definition of Human" (「人間」の定義, "Ningen" no Teigi); Gaiden. "The Military Festival" (軍部の祭り, Gunbu no Matsuri)
The Elrics reach Resembool to meet their childhood friend and Ed's auto mail mechanic Winry Rockbell, who repairs Ed's automail with her grandmother Pinako. After receiving his replacement arm and leg, Edward repairs Alphonse's armor before heading to Central for Marcoh's research notes. But the brothers find the first branch of the state library burned to the ground, courtesy of Lust before she meets up with her companion Gluttony to attack Scar. The Elrics and their new military escorts, Denny Brosh and Maria Ross are directed to Sheska, a former librarian and bibliophile whose eidetic memory allows her to duplicate Marcoh's research notes. The brothers crack the code and learn that the philosopher's stone is made by sacrificing living humans. Edward asks Brosh and Ross to keep it a secret, but Armstrong learns about it using intimidation. Edward notices another hidden piece of information, deducing the unused Fifth Laboratory as a likely place to check out. The brothers sneak out with Edward entering the lab via an air duct while Alphonse waits outside, The brothers forced to fight a pair of guards, serial killers whose souls were sealed in suits of armor like Alphonse.
| 04 | January 22, 2003 | 978-4-7575-0855-2 | November 8, 2005 | 978-1-59116-929-1 |
013. "Fullmetal Body" (鋼のからだ, Hagane no Karada); 014. "An Only Child's Feelings" (ひとりっ子の気持ち, Hitorikko no Kimochi); 015. "Fullmetal Heart" (鋼のこころ, Hagane no Kokoro); 016. "Separate Paths" (それぞれの行く先, Sorezore no Yukusaki); Gaiden. "Dog of the Military?" (軍の犬?, Gun no Inu?)
Edward defeats the Slicer brothers before they are killed off by Lust and Envy, the latter knocking out Ed when his automail arm breaks. Lust and Envy destroy the lab to cover up the evidence, with the fight between Al and Barry the Chopper cut short as Brosh and Ross arrive, Envy handing Ed over to Al and Ross while commenting that Ed is a valuable resource. As the hospitalized Ed gets his arm repaired by Winry, Alphonse contemplates the possibility of being artificial and later confronts Edward about it. Edward storms off and Winry yells at Alphonse, telling him that Edward was terrified Alphonse may have blamed him for getting him stuck in the armor. The Elric brothers have a sparring match and reaffirm their existence. The brothers give what they learned to Armstrong and Hughes as they are visited by Amestris's leader Führer King Bradley, who advises them to be careful around the military. The Elric brothers decide to head to Dublith for their next lead from their alchemy teacher Izumi Curtis, accompanied by Winry as she wants to visit Rush Valley, a town known for creating the best automail in the world, which is on the way to Dublith. Meanwhile, Hughes uncovers a terrifying secret while linking the problems in Liore, the fifth laboratory, and the Ishval civil war. He escapes Lust, only to be shot dead before he can tell Mustang by Envy posing as his wife Gracia. Hughes is posthumously promoted to the rank of brigadier general while his murder is investigated by Mustang, who concludes via Armstrong that a high ranking official may be responsible for ordering Hughes' death.
| 05 | June 21, 2003 | 978-4-7575-0966-5 | January 10, 2006 | 978-1-4215-0175-8 |
017. "The Boomtown of the Broken Down" (にわか景気の谷, Niwaka Keiki no Tani); 018. "The Value of Sincerity" (誠意の価値, Seii no Kachi); 019. "I'll Do It for You Guys!" (あんた達のかわりに, Anta-tachi no Kawari ni); 020. "The Terror of the Teacher" (師匠の恐怖, Sensei no Kyōfu); 021. "The Brothers' Secret" (二人だけの秘密, Futari dake no Himitsu)
The Elrics and Winry reach Rush Valley where they chase down a pickpocket with automail legs named Paninya who stole Ed's State Alchemist pocket watch, meeting an automail engineer named Dominic LeCoulte and helping in the birth of his grandchild. Winry remains in Rush Valley to become apprentice to another automail engineer while Edward and Alphonse crew heads to Dublith and meet their old alchemy teacher, Izumi Curtis, revealing their transgressions from attempting to revive their mother and that Izumi did the same in her own attempt to revive her stillborn child at the cost of her organs. During their stay, the Elric brothers recall how their father Van Hohenheim left them and their mother Trisha a few years before she died from a plague. In an effort to bring her back to life, the brothers met Izumi and requested to become her disciples.
| 06 | October 22, 2003 | 978-4-7575-1047-0 | March 21, 2006 | 978-1-4215-0319-6 |
022. "The Masked Man" (仮面の男, Kamen no Otoko); 023. "Knocking on Heaven's Door" (叩け 天国の扉, Tatake: Tengoku no Tobira); 024. "Fullmetal Alchemist" (鋼の錬金術師, Hagane no Renkinjutsushi); 025. "Master and Apprentice" (師弟のけじめ, Shitei no Kejime)
The brothers continue recapping their story on how they passed Izumi's test to figure out the meaning behind "one is all, all is one" while surviving for a month on an island while being stalked by a friend of Izumi's. Ed then reveals his perspective on the night he and Al attempted to revive their mother, meeting a metaphysical being called the Truth who bestowed Edward the secret behind perfect human transmutation in exchange for his left leg. After telling the events that lead to Ed becoming a State Alchemist, he and Izumi try to think of a way to recover Alphonse's lost memories of the Gate of Truth while Mustang is transferred from East City to Central.
| 07 | March 22, 2004 | 978-4-7575-1165-1 | May 16, 2006 | 978-1-4215-0458-2 |
026. "To Meet the Master" (主の元へ, Aruji no Moto e); 027. "The Beasts of Dublith" (ダブリスの獣たち, Daburisu no Kemono-tachi); 028. "A Fool's Courage" (匹夫の勇, Hippu no Yū); 029. "The Eye of the King" (王の眼, Ō no Me); Gaiden. "The Second Lieutenant Goes to Battle!" (戦う 少尉さん, Tatakau: Shōi-san)
While Edward is on study leave at South Headquarters for his annual assessment, Alphonse is lured to a trap by a group of humanoid chimeras who capture him and take him to the Devil's Nest bar. Al is brought before the chimeras' boss Greed, who bears the Oroboros tattoo like Lust while introducing himself as an artificial human known as a homunculus. Greed explains his desire to understand soul affixation to achieve his goal of being immortal, arranging for Edward to come to the Devil's Nest to make an arrangement by offering to teach the human homunculus fabrication. But an enraged Ed attacks Greed instead, managing to bypass the homunculus's Ultimate Shield ability as Izumi arrives followed by a military raid overseen by King Bradley. Greed and his chimera underlings Roa, Martel, and Dolcetto flee down the sewers with Al. Bradley goes into the sewage passageway beneath the hideout and duels with Greed, overpowering the homunculus while revealed to be one himself.
| 08 | July 22, 2004 | 978-4-7575-1230-6 | July 18, 2006 | 978-1-4215-0459-9 |
030. "The Truth Inside the Armor" (鎧の中 真理の奧, Yoroi no Naka: Shinri no Oku); 031. "The Snake That Eats Its Own Tail" (己の尾を噛む蛇, Onore no O o Kamu Hebi); 032. "Emissary From the East" (東方の使者, Tōhō no Shisha); 033. "Showdown in Rush Valley" (ラッシュバレーの攻防, Rasshu Barē no Kōbō); Gaiden. "Fullmetal Alchemist and the Broken Angel" (鋼の錬金術師 翔べない天使, Hagane no Renkinjutsushi: Tobenai Tenshi)
Bradley subdues Greed while killing off Roa and Dolcetto. Martel, who is still inside Alphonse, attempts to strangle Bradley before Bradley stabs her through an opening in Al's armor. Martel's blood splashes on Alphonse's blood seal and restores his forgotten memories. Bradley, whose true name is Wrath, takes Greed to the other homunculi and their creator known as "Father". Father expresses disappointment in Greed's desertion and has him melted down into a liquid philosopher's stone, which he ingests. The Elric brothers return to Rush Valley where they reunite with Winry while reluctantly gaining a new traveling companion in a foreigner named Lin Yao, revealed to be a prince from the eastern nation of Xing who came to Amestris with his bodyguards Lan Fan and Fu to acquire the secret of immortality for the ailing emperor. Meanwhile, Barry the Chopper is secretly detained by Mustang after being subdued by his right hand Riza Hawkeye while Scar makes his way to Central with Yoki and a Xingese princess named May Chang who also seeks the secret of immortality to earn the emperor's favor.
| 09 | November 22, 2004 | 978-4-7575-1318-1 | September 19, 2006 | 978-1-4215-0460-5 |
034. "The Footsteps of a War Comrade" (戦友の足跡, Tomo no Ashimoto); 035. "The Sacrificial Lamb" (生け贄の羊, Ikenie no Hitsuji); 036. "Alchemist in Distress" (苦渋の錬金術師, Kujū no Renkinjutsushi); 037. "The Body of a Criminal" (咎人の肉体, Togabito no Nikutai)
The Elric Brothers and Winry return to Central, separated from Ling as he got himself arrested for being an illegal immigrant. As the Elrics learn of Hughes's death, Envy devises a scheme to throw Mustang off his investigation by framing Ross for Hughes's murder. Ross is placed in Colonel Henry Douglas's custody before she and Ling are broken out by Barry, the Elric brothers encountering the trio as Barry holds them off so Ross can run into Mustang. Edward confronts Mustang upon seeing Ross's charred remains and is coldly reminded of his place as a soldier of the state military. Later, Armstrong shows up and declares that Edward should return to Resembool to have his automail arm fixed, dragging the confused Edward away. The homunculi focus their attention to hunting down Barry with his decaying original body, infused with the soul of an animal. But Mustang foresaw this and arranged for Hawkeye and his subordinate Jean Havoc to protect Barry and Falman, before Hawkeye is attacked in her hiding place by Gluttony.
| 10 | March 11, 2005 | 978-4-7575-1386-0 | November 21, 2006 | 978-1-4215-0461-2 |
038. "Signal to Strike" (反撃ののろし, Hangeki no Noroshi); 039. "Complications at Central" (錯綜のセントラル, Sakusō no Sentoraru); 040. "Philosopher from the West" (西の賢者, Nishi no Kenja); 041. "On the Palm of an Arrogant Human Being" (小さな人間の傲慢な掌, Chiisa na Ningen no Gōman na Tenohira)
Mustang saves Hawkeye and subdues Gluttony before he, Hawkeye, and Havoc are joined by Alphonse in pursuing Barry and his original body to the Third Laboratory. Ling and Lan Fan hold off Envy and Gluttony, noting their strange chi to be equal to large groups of people. Splitting up from the others, Mustang and Havoc are ambushed by Lust who cripples Havok before grievously wounding Mustang. Lust then finds Hawkeye and Alphonse as they locate Barry with his original body, which Barry assumed to have died from its incompatible soul. Lust slices Barry to pieces while forcing a heartbroken Hawkeye to empty out her ammunition upon telling her Mustang is dead, recognizing Alphonse as a sacrifice when he protects Hawkeye. Mustang appears, having cauterized his wounds, and repeatedly incinerates Lust until the philosopher's stone serving as her core is depleted. The dying Lust accepts her defeat while hinting a specific day in the near future, followed by Barry after his original body scratched out his blood seal and died immediately. Meanwhile, Edward and Armstrong arrive in Resembool and are guided by Heymans Breda to the ruined city of Xerxes between Ametris and Xing. Once there, they learned Mustang faked Ross's death with Fu escorting her to Xing as part of an arrangement between Mustang and Ling. After Ross' departure, Edward finds a damaged transmutation circle along with a group of Ishvalan refugees, who reveal that it was Scar who killed Winry's parents while they gave medical aid to the Ishvalan during the civil war.
| 11 | July 22, 2005 | 978-4-7575-1496-6 | January 16, 2007 | 978-1-4215-0838-2 |
042. "The Father Standing Before a Grave" (墓前の父, Bozen no Chichi); 043. "River of Mud" (泥の河, Doro no Kawa); 044. "The Unnamed Grave" (名前の無い墓, Namae no Nai Haka); 045. "Scar's Return" (傷の男再び, Kizu no Otoko Futatabi)
Edward returns to Resembool and meets his long absent father, Van Hohenheim. After arguing with his father, Edward overhears Hohenheim tell Pinako Rockbell that the transmuted corpse the Elric brothers created may not be their mother. Hohenheim leaves the next day, warning Pinako that something terrible will happen in Amestris. Edward and Pinako dig up the failed transmutation corpse during a downpour and Edward confirms it as something else. Edward then calls Izumi, asking her to confirm that child in her transmutation was definitely not hers. Edward returns to Central and reunites with Alphonse and Winry, explaining his discoveries. Izumi calls Edward, to say the transmuted baby was not hers. Edward, Alphonse, and Izumi then feel a sense of relief that they had not killed their loved ones a second time. This confirms Edward's suspicions that it is impossible to revive the dead. However, Edward reassures the others that retrieving someone from beyond the gateway of Truth is still possible and the Elric brothers reaffirm their resolve to return Alphonse to his original body. As Mustang learns Havoc is leaving the military as a result of Lust paralyzing him, the Elric brothers learn of Scar's appearance in Central and confront him to draw out the homunculi with Ling and Lan Fan agreeing to help for the former's own agenda. As the Elrics fight Scar, Lan Fan intercepts Gluttony before being attacked by Bradley.
| 12 | November 21, 2005 | 978-4-7575-1573-4 | March 20, 2007 | 978-1-4215-0839-9 |
046. "The Distant Image of Their Backs" (遠くの背中, Tōku no Senaka); 047. "A Girl in the Grip of Battles Past and Present" (戦場の少女, Ikusaba no Shōjo); 048. "A Promise Made by Those Who Wait" (待ち人の約束, Machibito no Yakusoku); 049. "A Monster Among Men" (人中の化け物, Jinchū no Bakemono)
Ling tries to escape with the wounded Lan Fan with Bradley and Gluttony in pursuit. Meanwhile, Winry heads to where the Elric brothers are fighting Scar and overhears that the latter killed her parents. The shocked Winry picks up a gun she aims at Scar, recalling how his brother, who was combining Amestrian alchemy with Xingese alkahastry during the civil war, sacrificed himself to save his life when their family were slaughtered by a state alchemist named Solf J. Kimblee. Upon coming to in the care of the Rockwell doctors, Scar killed them in a fit of rage. Back in the present, Edward intervenes between Winry and Scar, reminding Scar of when his brother protected him. Edward then consoles the traumatized Winry before rejoining the fight against Scar as Gluttony joins the fray. But Ling, managing to escape Bradley after Lan Fan sliced off her damaged arm for a decoy, captures Gluttony before he and Hawkeye spirit the immobilized homunculus away. Scar also manages to escape thanks to May using her alkahestry to create a smokescreen, though her panda Shao Mei ends up with the Elrics. After seeing Winry off on her train to the Rush Valley while entrusting Lan Fan to Mustang's friend Doctor Knox, the group meet up at an abandoned house where Gluttony is being held. Ling reveals that Bradley is a homunculus despite having the chi of a normal human. When Gluttony hears mention of Mustang, he transforms into a fit of rage with the Elrics and the Ling holding him off while Mustang and the others escape. Envy arrives to stop Gluttony from harming the Elric brothers, with the brothers taking advantage before the eye on Gluttony's stomach accidentally swallows Edward, Ling, and Envy.
| 13 | March 22, 2006 | 978-4-7575-1638-0 | May 15, 2007 | 978-1-4215-1158-0 |
050. "In the Belly of the Beast" (腹の中, Hara no Naka); 051. "A Portal in the Darkness" (闇の扉, Yami no Tobira); 052. "Lord of the Demon's Lair" (魔窟の王, Makutsu no Ō); 053. "Signpost of the Soul" (魂の道標, Tamashii no Dōhyō)
Edward and Ling find themselves in an endless dark cavern before they are joined by Envy, who explains there's no escape while revealing that Gluttony was a failed attempt by their creator at recreating the Gate of Truth. Envy then admits that he posed as the soldier who murdered an Ishvalan child and sparked the Ishval civil war. Edward angrily attacks Envy, who loses his composure and attacks the humans in his true appearance as a giant creature with the souls of his philosopher's stone bubbling from his hide. Envy capitalizes at Edward's hesitance to attack and swallows him, only for Edward to convince the homunculus that he figured a way to escape as he realized the homunculi concealed their role in Xeres's destruction. After having Envy gather the missing fragments of the Xeres slab to translate it, Edward reluctantly uses the souls inside Envy's stone to transmute himself and open the Gate of Truth for Ling and Envy to escape. At the Gate, Edward finds Alphonse's emaciated body but is unable to bring it back while vowing to return. Alphonse and Gluttony arrive at Father's lair as Edward, Ling, and Envy burst out of Gluttony's stomach. Meanwhile, Mustang stumbles upon a conspiracy between Bradley and the military's top brass while learning that Bradley is actually a human turned into a homunculus.
| 14 | July 22, 2006 | 978-4-7575-1719-6 | August 14, 2007 | 978-1-4215-1379-9 |
054. "The Fool's Struggle" (愚者の足掻き, Gusha no Ashikaki); 055. "The Avarice of Two" (二人の強欲, Futari no Gōyoku); 056. "The Lion of the Round Table" (円卓の獅子, Entaku no Shishi); 057. "Scars of Ishbal" (イシュヴァールの傷, Ishuvāru no Kizu); Gaiden. Short Story
Father, who bears a resemblance to Honenhiem, uses his special powers to heal the Elric brothers before negating their alchemy when they attempt to fight back when Father tries to have Ling killed. But Father reconsiders and makes a willing Ling the host of the philosopher's stone of a new version of Greed. Scar and May, having followed Alphonse in their search for Shao Mei, are still able to use their alchemy. Edward takes advantage by revealing Father and the homunculi triggered the Ishval civil war, with Scar attacking Father before retreating upon realizing his attacks have no effect. Edward is subdued by Greed, realizing Ling is still alive, while Envy captures Alphonse after he hid May in his body when Scar creates an explosion that fatally damages Gluttony with Father absorbing his extracted stone to reconstitute the homunculus. Envy takes the brothers to Bradley, who threatens to kill Winry if Ed resigns from the state military while telling Mustang that did not kill Hughes. The brothers learn Bradley transferred Mustang's subordinates to other branches while taking Hawkeye as his new aide, Al placing May under Knox's care while delivering a message Ling had Greed gave them for Lan Fan. Meanwhile, Scar encounters the imprisoned Marcoh who confesses to his involvement in the Ishvalan genocide and begs Scar to kill him to stop the homunculis' plans. But Scar demands to know more about Marcoh's involvement in the civil war.
| 15 | November 22, 2006 | 978-4-7575-1812-4 | December 18, 2007 | 978-1-4215-1380-5 |
058. "The Footsteps of Ruin" (破滅の足音, Hametsu no Ashioto); 059. "The Immoral Alchemist" (背徳の錬金術師, Haitoku no Renkinjutsushi); 060. "In the Absence of God" (神の不在, Kami no Fuzai); 061. "The Hero of Ishbal" (イシュヴァールの英雄, Ishuvāru no Eiyū)
Edward meets up with Hawkeye to return the gun she lent him during the incident with Gluttony, explaining his inability to pull the trigger when asking about the Ishvalan war. Hawkeye explains how Bradley signed a document approving the Ishvalans' extermination in the war's seventh year with the killing taking its toll on many state alchemists and soldiers, including Mustang, Hughes, and Armstrong. The Ishvalan leader attempted to broker peace by offering his life, but Bradley refused before the war eventually ended with Mustang resolved to become Führer to restructure the Amestrian government even if it meant he and Hawkeye could be branded war criminals. Meanwhile, Marcoh confesses to Scar that he oversaw the creation of philosopher's stones from Ishvalan prisoners with one stone given to Kimblee who was eventually arrested for killing his superiors at the war's end after mercilessly slaughtering Ishvalans, including Scar's family. Later, Envy checks Marcoh's prison cell and finds a beheaded corpse with the word "vengeance" written in blood on the wall.
| 16 | March 22, 2007 | 978-4-7575-1965-7 | March 18, 2008 | 978-1-4215-1381-2 |
062. "Beyond the Dream" (夢の先, Yume no Saki); 063. "The Promise Made for 520 Cenz" (520センズの約束, 520 Senzu no Yakusoku); 064. "The Northern Wall of Briggs" (ブリッグズの北壁, Burigguzu no Hokuheki); 065. "The Ironclad Rule" (鉄の掟, Tetsu no Okite)
After contemplating how Scar and May could transmute when the everyone else's alchemy was blocked at the time, Edward and Alphonse decide to find the latter as Mustang's subordinates go their separate ways. Meanwhile, realizing that Scar helped Marcoh escape, Envy releases Kimblee from prison to assist in tracking them down. Scar disfigures Marcoh's face so he will not be recognized as his group head north to recover his brother's notes. Informing the Elrics that May is heading north following their meeting with Bradley's adopted son Selim, Armstrong gives Edward a letter of introduction to his older sister, Major General Olivier Armstrong who overseers Fort Briggs at the northern border. Arriving to Briggs while accused of being spies from the neighboring country of Drachma, the brothers are forced to work in exchange for staying and reunite with the recently promoted Falman. As they are shoe the fortress' lower level, they encounter the homunculus Sloth, who has been digging underneath Amestris. Edward holds back his knowledge about the homunculus when Olivier demands his connections to the brute, only mentioning that his makeup is similar to that of a human, which gives Olivier an idea on how to defeat Sloth.
| 17 | August 11, 2007 | 978-4-7575-2064-6 | October 21, 2008 | 978-1-4215-2161-9 |
066. "The Snow Queen" (雪の女王, Yuki no Joō); 067. "Burgeoning Borders" (この国のかたち, Kono Kuni no Katachi); 068. "Portrait of a Family" (家族の肖像, Kazoku no Shōzō); 069. "The Foundation of Briggs" (ブリッグズの礎, Brigguzu no Ishizue)
The Elrics, along with the Briggs soldiers, manage to freeze Sloth before being sent to the brig so Olivier can learn more about the homunculus by taking them down to the tunnel so they can tell her without fear of reprisals. While there, Edward deduces that the tunnel is being used as a giant transmutation circle for creating a transmutation circle with the nodes being at places Falman identifies as sites of bloodied conflict. The Elrics realize Father and the homunculi where orchestrated events since Amestris's founding. Meanwhile, after being wounded during his attempt to kill Scar, a hospitalized Kimblee is visited by General Raven who brought another state alchemist to heal his wounds. Kimblee and Raven arrive to Briggs soon after with Olivier tricking Raven into revealing the existence of an immortal army while the Briggs soldiers investigating the tunnels are attacked by a mysterious shadow. Raven instructs Olivier to put Sloth back into the tunnel and seal it off, with Olivier killing Raven as he is buried alive in the cement. As Olivier shows a few of her men a separate entrance to the tunnel, Kimblee brings Winry over to see Edward and Alphonse as part of Bradley's orders to remind them of their place and situation. Meanwhile, Scar and Yoki reunite with May and Marcoh after they found the notebook while Mustang receives information about the events in Briggs from his intelligence sources and a message from Olivier.
| 18 | December 22, 2007 | 978-4-7575-2175-9 | May 19, 2009 | 978-1-4215-2536-5 |
070. "The First Homunculus" (始まりのホムンクルス, Hajimari no Homunkurusu); 071. "In the Grip of the Red Lotus" (紅蓮の男, Guren no Otoko); 072. "A Chain of Negativity, a Pebble of Goodness" (負の連鎖 正の一石, Fu no Rensa, Sei no Isseki); 073. "A Daydream" (白昼の夢, Hakuchū no Yume)
In Central, Hawkeye discovers that Selim is Pride whose shadowy extensions patrol the tunnels and is threatened to keep quiet. Back in the north, Kimblee presents Winry as a hostage to ensure the Elrics' cooperation while providing Ed with cold-resistant automail. He orders Edward to locate Scar and Marcoh along with killing a large number of people from Briggs to create the final blood crest for the nation-wide transmutation circle, offering to give Edward a philosopher's stone for his help if he accepts. Edward accepts the job, although Alphonse suspects that Edward accepted so they can find May. The Elric brothers leave for the mining town of Baschool with Winry, running into May, Marcoh, and Yoki after losing their assigned guards. The brothers leave Winry as they find Scar attacked by two of Kimblee's chimera soldiers, Jerso and Zanpano. Edward and Alphonse subdue the chimeras and then restrain Scar as Winry arrives with half-Ishvalan Briggs soldier Miles. When faced with the option of judging her parents' killer, Winry decides to bandage Scar's wounds instead while Miles explains he remained in the military to gradually change how the Ishvalans are perceived. Since May and Marcoh need Scar to decipher his brother's research, Miles offers to hide everyone at the fort, with Alphonse insisting on sparing the two chimeras. Winry comes up with a ruse to make it look like Scar's group kidnapped her to elude Kimblee so they, Jerso and Zanpano reach the fort through the mines as a blizzard sets in. Miles then receives word that Olivier has been called back to Central with Briggs now controlled by Central officials. Alphonse willingly goes into the blizzard to find and warn the group and briefly sees his body, and wonders if it is trying to retrieve its soul. Meanwhile, Father sets up pieces representing the Elrics, their father, and Izumi around a transmutation circle while noting one more sacrifice is required.
| 19 | March 22, 2008 | 978-4-7575-2237-4 | July 21, 2009 | 978-1-4215-2568-6 |
074. "The Dwarf in the Flask" (フラスコの中の小人, Furasuku no Naka no Kobito); 075. "The Last Days of Xerxes" (クセルクセス最期の日, Kuserukusesu Saigo no Hi); 076. "Shape of a Person, Shape of a Stone" (人の形 石の形, Hito no Katachi: Ishi no Katachi); 077. "The Tables Are Turned; A New Transmutation Circle" (逆転の錬成陣, Gyakuten no Renseijin); 078. "The Seven Deadly Sins" (七つの罪, Nanatsu no Tsumi)
As Olivier meets with Bradley and takes Raven's seat in Central among the higher ups the homunculi promised immortality, Hawkeye gives Mustang a coded message that reveals Pride's true identity. Meanwhile, Father daydreams of the time in ancient Xerxes as a being in flask created from the blood of a slave he named Van Hohenheim. Naming himself "Homunculus", Father helped Hohenheim earn his freedom and become a great alchemist. Expressing his own desire for freedom, Father tricked the immortality-seeking king of Xerxes into carving a nation-wide transmutation circle with himself and Hohenheim in the center to absorb the sacrificed souls with Father creating a new vessel in Hohenheim's image. In the present, as Scar's group decides to take refuge in an Ishvalan slum after being joined by Alphonse, Miles's assassination attempt on Kimblee fails with Ed seriously injured in the resulting fight. He is then rescued by Kimblee's chimeras, Darius and Heinkel, who had been betrayed by their boss. Alphonse, who realizes his body is calling him back, inspires May to rip out the notebook pages to rearrange and overlap them, revealing the nationwide Amestris transmutation circle. After accidentally flipping some of the pages, they assemble another alkahestry transmutation circle that will neutralize the first. As Sloth finishes the tunnel, Kimblee is instructed by Pride to trick Drachma soldiers into a suicidal attack on Briggs to complete the blood crest. Hohenheim arrives in Liore and enters an underground passage under the church of Leto linking to the tunnel, managing to evade Pride while deducing that Father created the homunculi from the flawed aspects of his being and gives Pride a message to tell Father that he is coming.
| 20 | August 22, 2008 | 978-4-7575-2353-1 | September 15, 2009 | 978-1-4215-3034-5 |
079. "Bite Of The Ant" (蟻のひと噛み, Ari no Hito Kami); 080. "The Prodigal Father Returns" (瞼の父, Mabuta no Chichi); 081. "A Full Recovery" (バリバリの全開, Baribari no Zenkai); 082. "Family By Spirit" (魂の家族, Tamashii no Kazoku); 083. "The Promised Day" (約束の日, Yakusoku no Hi)
Alphonse and his group lure Envy into a trap and outsmart him with May's alkahestry traps, only to be overpowered when Envy reverts to his monstrous form and captures Marcoh while revealing the new stone Kimblee is using was created from Marcoh's assistants. This revelation spurs Marcoh to destroy the philosopher's stone inside Envy, reducing him to his true form as an embryonic parasite. Scar gives the powerless Envy to May so she can return to her country while the others travel for Liore in an attempt to damage the tunnel, only for Envy to trick the girl into heading for Central instead. In Central, Bido, the last of the Devil's Nest chimeras, sneaks into the area of the underground tunnel where as Olivier is shown the artificially created immortal army. Bido ends up being killed by Greed, causing the memories of his former existence to resurface as he violently confronts Bradley before Ling regains control of his body at the last moment to flee. Al meets Hohenheim in Liore while Ed and his group are joined by Ling and Greed, the brothers learning of an upcoming solar eclipse on the Promised Day that the homunculi are striving for and pass the message through their allies to Mustang.
| 21 | December 22, 2008 | 978-4-7575-2439-2 | November 17, 2009 | 978-1-4215-3232-5 |
084. "Shadow of the Pursuer" (追跡者の影, Tsuisekisha no Kage); 085. "The Empty Box" (空の箱, Kara no Hako); 086. "Servant of Darkness" (闇の使者, Yami no Shisha); 087. "An Oath Made in the Underground" (地下道の誓い, Chikadō no Chikai)
Reunited with Edward after Briggs soldiers escort her home, Winry directs him to the slum outskirts of Central where Honenheim is. As Mustang's and Olivier's forces prepare, Bradley makes an appearance in East City while Pride and Gluttony capture Alphonse as his blackouts become more frequent. On the day before the Promised Day, Bradley is tricked into taking a train back to Central and is caught in an explosion on a rail bridge with the higher ups panicking before Father makes his presence known to quell their concerns as Olivier was about to make her move. Edward's group meet Hohenheim before they are attacked by Alphonse, who is being puppeteered by Pride before Edward blacks out the slums to negate the homunculus's shadows. As Heinkel uses his nocturnal vision to attack Pride, the others are attacked by Gluttony before Ling. Ed comes to Heinkel's aid after Pride acquires a light source by causing a forest fire, with Fu providing flash bombs to sever Pride's shadows so Darius can get Al to safety while Gluttony stumbles in. Upon discovering that Ling and Lan Fan can sense homunculi, Pride devours Gluttony to replenish his life and acquire the other homunculus's sense of smell to regain the advantage. Meanwhile, Mustang meets up with his group as they proceed to abduct Mrs. Bradley.
| 22 | April 11, 2009 | 978-4-7575-2538-2 | January 19, 2010 | 978-1-4215-3413-8 |
088. "The Understanding Between Father and Son" (親子の情, Oyako no Jō); 089. "Soldier's Return" (戦士の旗艦, Senshi no Kikan); 090. "Army of Immortals" (不死の軍団, Fushi no Gundan); 091. "A Reunion of Alchemists" (賢者の再会, Kenja no Saikai)
Alphonse intentionally allows himself to be captured by Pride so that Hohenheim can encase them in a mountain of soil to remove Pride from the fight. As the Promised Day begins, Greed goes to Central on his own while both Edward and Scar's groups meet up again to devise a plan. In Central, Mustang wins over Mrs. Bradley as his group are joined by his old regiment from Ishval, Maria Ross, and Rebecca Catalina while being supplied weapons by Havoc's connections. Buccaneer and the Briggs soldiers commence their assault as Olivier takes a general hostage before being attacked by Sloth on Father's orders. A Senior Staff member decides to infuse the immortal army with philosopher's stones to quell the coup, only for the awakened mannequin soldiers to begin killing indiscriminately. During the chaos, Edward's group sneaks into the third laboratory with Honenheim and Lan parting ways with the others who end up fighting the mannequin soldiers. In the sewers, May is also attacked by some mannequin soldiers with Envy assimilating them to regain his full power. In the outskirts, Alphonse and Heinkel learn too late that Pride had been sending a morse code message as Kimblee frees Pride. Alphonse transmutes his legs off to escape Pride and help the wounded Heinkel, who then gives him the philosopher's stone that Kimblee had previously lost in the mine explosion. Alphonse reluctantly uses it to restore his legs before facing Pride and Kimblee.
| 23 | August 12, 2009 | 978-4-7575-2602-0 | July 20, 2010 | 978-1-4215-3630-9 |
092. "With Everyone's Strength" (皆の力, Minna no Chikara); 093. "Archenemy" (不倶戴天の敵, Fugutaiten no Kataki); 094. "The Flames of Vengeance" (復讐の炎, Fukushū no Honō); 095. "Beyond the Inferno" (烈火の先に, Rekka no Saki ni); Special Episode. "Fullmetal Alchemist, Wii: Prince of Dawn, Prologue" (暁の王子—Prologue, Akatsuki no Ōji—Prologue)
Alphonse uses the philosopher's stone to battle Pride and Kimblee before the latter turns the tables with his own stone. But Al uses a dust cloud to sneak his stone back to Marcoh in order to heal Heinkel, who snaps Kimblee's neck before the groups flee to Central while Pride decides to devour the dying Kimblee so he can live on as a part of him. In Central, as the citizens begin supporting the rebels, Armstrong comes to Olivier's aid against Sloth and the mannequin soldiers alongside Central soldiers putting their survival above their orders to kill Olivier. In the third laboratory, Ed's group are joined by Mustang and Hawkeye as they finish off the last of the mannequin soldiers before May and Envy fall into the chamber. Envy reveals himself as Hughes' killer, causing Mustang to lose control and reduce the homunculus to his weakened state. Before Mustang can kill Envy, Edward, Hawkeye and Scar persuade him to not let his desire for revenge control him. An outraged Envy tries to goad them into killing each other by reminding them of the horrible things they have done to each other before Edward concludes that Envy hates humans because he is jealous of their capacity to continue living despite all the abuse they take. Humiliated and insulted by Edward's analysis, Envy commits suicide by tearing out and destroying his own philosopher's stone. Meanwhile, as Izumi helps the Briggs soldiers enter Central Command, Hohenheim confronts Father alone.
| 24 | December 22, 2009 | 978-4-7575-2742-3 | January 18, 2011 | 978-1-4215-3812-9 |
096. "The Two Heroines" (二人の女傑, Futari no Joketsu); 097. "The Two Philosophers" (二人の賢者, Futari no Kenja); 098. "Infinite Greed" (底無しの強欲, Sokonashi no Gōyoku); 099. "Eternal Rest" (永遠の暇, Eien no Itoma); Gaiden. "Daughter of the Dusk—Prologue" (黄昏の少女—Prologue, Tasogare no Shōjo—Prologue)
Izumi and her husband Sig aid the Armstrong siblings in inflicting enough damage on Sloth to finally kill him before proceeding to exterminate the remaining to the mannequin soldiers as Briggs takes over Central Command. But the victory is short-lived as Bradley, having escaped the attempt in his life, arrives and storms the battlements where he battles Greed and Buccaneer as Fu arrives to avenge Lan Fan. In the end, Fu and Buccaneer sacrifice themselves to wound Bradley enough for a furious Ling to scratch out his ultimate eye as Lan Fan arrives. Meanwhile, Hohenheim evades Father's attacks before unnerving him about his reasons for creating the homuncli as a substitute family. Father attempts to take the philosopher's stone from within Hohenheim, learning too late that Hohenheim managed to reasoned with each soul in his body as the ones that invaded Father's body proceed to destroy his vessel. But Father reveals that evolved enough to survive outside of the skin in his true form. At the same time, Edward's group encounters the gold-toothed doctor who created Bradley and healed Kimblee. The group battles the rejected Führer candidates before doctor activates a transmutation circle connected to Central's research labs, teleporting Edward, Alphonse, and Izumi to Father's location.
| 25 | April 22, 2010 | 978-4-7575-2840-6 | June 7, 2011 | 978-1-4215-3924-9 |
100. "The Forbidden Door" (開かずの扉, Akazu no Tobira); 101. "The Fifth Human Sacrifice" (5人目の人柱, Goninme no Hitobashira); 102. "Before the Door" (扉の前, Tobira no Mae); 103. "For Whose Sake" (誰のため, Dare no Tame)
After the mortally wounded Bradley is knocked off the battlements into the moat below, Ling is distraught at his inability to save Fu while honoring the dying's Buccaneer request to defend the front gate. Ling complies and draws upon the full power of Greed's ultimate shield to annihilate all the Central forces before the gate. Meanwhile, the gold-toothed doctor has Hawkeye's throat slit to force Mustang into performing human transmutation to save her life at the cost of becoming a sacrifice. But Mustang refuses as May arrives with Jerso, Zampano and Darius taking out the Führer candidates while May heals Hawkeye's wound. However, Bradley pins down Mustang so Pride can force the colonel to perform human transmutation with the gold-toothed doctor as material. Mustang passes through his Gate of Truth, losing his eyesight while appearing in Father's lair with Pride. Due to the transmutation circle that transported the Elrics and Izumi to the place where Father and the subdued Hohenheim are, Alphonse encounters his original body in the Gate of Truth, but refuses to recover it as its emaciated state would prevent him from helping the others. While Al's body noted his soul's nobility, he notes his other self completed Father's number of five sacrifices upon his return.
| 26 | August 12, 2010 | 978-4-7575-2929-8 | September 20, 2011 | 978-1-4215-3962-1 |
104. "The Center of the World" (世界の中心, Sekai no Chūshin); 105. "The Throne of God" (神の御座, Kami no Miza); 106. "The Abyss of Pride" (傲慢の深淵, Puraido no Shin'en)
Scar's Ishvalan allies lay alkahestry transmutation circles throughout Central as the solar eclipse draws near, with Scar revealing to have tattooed his brother's reconstruction transmutation circle on his left arm while fighting Bradley. Edward and Alphonse battle Pride upon the former realizing the homunculus's body is damaged from forcing Mustang into becoming a sacrifice while May takes on Father before he grabs the sacrifices to place them in position despite Greed's attempt to hijack his plan, revealing he is actually using the souls of the 50 million Amestrians to open the Earth's Gate and force open the Heaven's Gate to absorb the entity he considers God and create a new body. But Hohenheim reveals that had placed fragments of his own philosopher's stone across the country to reverse the process upon being activated by the eclipse's umbra. The Amestrians' souls return to their bodies while Scar manages to kill Bradley, proceeding to activate the alkahestry circle his brother develop to restores Amestrian alchemy to its greatest potential. Father heads above ground searching for more souls to replenish his stone supply and is chased by Edward's team. Edward stays to fight Pride who attempts to replace his deteriorating body with Edward's. However, Kimblee's soul reappears thwarting him and enabling Edward to enter Pride's body and destroy it. Pride reverts to a small defenseless fetus-like form which Edward spares and then he leaves to join his friends as Father spawns the Xerxes people from his body to catch them off guard before unleashing a powerful blast which wipes out half of Central headquarters.
| 27 | November 22, 2010 | 978-4-7575-3054-6 | December 20, 2011 | 978-1-4215-3984-3 |
107. "The Final Battle" (最後の戦い, Saigo no Tatakai); 108. "The Journey's End" (旅路の果て, Tabiji no Hate); Gaiden. "Another Journey's End" (もうひとつの旅路の果て, Mō Hitotsu no Tabiji no Hate)
Alphonse and Hohenheim are heavily damaged protecting the others from Father's attack as they are joined by the Fort Briggs soldiers and those able to continue fighting to wear down Father's philosopher's stone to the point of needing to physically defend himself. As Father starts to lose control of the entity, he creates a blast which pins Edward's left arm while obliterating his automail arm. With May's help, Alphonse trades his soul to rejoin his body while restoring Edward's original right arm. Father desperately tries to absorb Greed after being pummeled by a furious Edward, Greed leaving Ling's body to save his life while using his carbonization ability to turn Father's body into weak charcoal. Father extinguishes Greed's soul before Edward punches through Father's chest to release the Xerxes souls, causing Father to implode as he appears before his Gate of Truth before being dragged back into the void he was spawned from. In the wake of Father's defeat, everyone mourns Alphonse's sacrifice while Edward ultimately decides to perform a human transmutation on himself, sacrificing his own gate and his ability to ever again use alchemy with it. In return for trading his ability to perform alchemy, Edward is allowed to bring Alphonse back with him in his original body. The Xingese return to their homeland with Ling acquiring the gold-toothed doctor while vowing to protect May's clan and the others upon succeeding the emperor, Mustang deciding to begin overseeing Ishval's restoration while Marcoh restores his eyesight and Havoc's spine. Scar also aids Miles to ensure the continuation of their people's culture. As his sons recuperate from the battle, having exhausted his philosopher's stone, Hohenheim returns to Resembool and dies peacefully before Trisha's grave. The Elric brothers return to Resembool and receive a warm welcome from Winry. Two years later, as Führer Grumman visits Mrs. Bradley and a seemingly reformed Selim, the Elric Brothers are still haunted by their ordeal with Shou Tucker and resolve to prevent anyone else from suffering Nina's fate. Alphonse travels to Xing and east of it with Jerso and Zampano to learn alkahestry from May while Edward learns alchemy in western country of Creta and beyond. Winry accepts Ed's awkward marriage proposal while seeing him off.
