= List of Boys Over Flowers volumes =

Boys Over Flowers (Japanese: 花より男子, Hepburn: Hana Yori Dango; lit. "Dango [Preferred] over Flowers") is a Japanese manga series written and illustrated by Yoko Kamio. The story is set in Tokyo, Japan. It centers on students at the fictional "Eitoku Academy", an elite school for children from rich families. It tells the story of Tsukushi Makino, a girl from a middle class family; whose mother enrolled her in an elite high school to compete with the families from her husband's company. While at Eitoku, she encounters the F4, a gang of four young men who are children of Japan's wealthiest families, and who bully anyone that gets in their way.

Boys Over Flowers was serialized in Shueisha's bi-weekly magazine Margaret from October 1992 to January 2004. In July 2006, a short story based on the manga was published in issue 15 of Margaret magazine; another two-installment short story was published in January 2007. The series was collected in 37 tankōbon volumes released between October 23, 1992, and June 25, 2008. English translations of all 37 volumes were released between 2003 and 2009 by Viz Media. It has also been published by Glénat in France; and by Planeta DeAgostini in Spain.

Kamio began a sequel, titled Boys Over Flowers Season 2, in Shueisha's Shōnen Jump+ online magazine on February 15, 2015.

== Volumes list ==
No.	Original release date	Original ISBN	North America release date	North America ISBN
1	October 23, 1992	4-08-848028-7	August 6, 2003	1-56931-996-0
2	January 25, 1993	4-08-848055-4	October 8, 2003	1-56931-997-9
3	June 25, 1993	4-08-848103-8	December 3, 2003	1-56931-998-7
4	August 25, 1993	4-08-848123-2	February 18, 2004	1-59116-112-6
5	November 25, 1993	4-08-848153-4	March 24, 2004	1-59116-141-X
6	March 25, 1994	4-08-848193-3	June 9, 2004	1-59116-314-5
7	June 24, 1994	4-08-848223-9	August 10, 2004	1-59116-370-6
8	September 22, 1994	4-08-848253-0	November 2, 2004	1-59116-371-4
9	January 25, 1995	4-08-848295-6	December 14, 2004	1-59116-372-2
10	May 25, 1995	4-08-848343-X	February 8, 2005	1-59116-629-2
11	August 25, 1995	4-08-848383-9	April 12, 2005	1-59116-747-7
12	November 24, 1995	4-08-848423-1	June 5, 2005	1-59116-801-5
13	March 25, 1996	4-08-848475-4	August 16, 2005	1-59116-865-1
14	September 25, 1996	4-08-848549-1	October 11, 2005	1-4215-0018-3
15	November 25, 1996	4-08-848572-6	December 13, 2005	1-4215-0136-8
16	February 25, 1997	4-08-848611-0	February 14, 2006	1-4215-0262-3
17	July 25, 1997	4-08-848677-3	April 11, 2006	1-4215-0392-1
18	October 24, 1997	4-08-848716-8	June 13, 2006	1-4215-0532-0
19	February 25, 1998	4-08-848766-4	August 8, 2006	1-4215-0533-9
20	May 25, 1998	4-08-848805-9	October 10, 2006	1-4215-0534-7
21	October 23, 1998	4-08-848870-9	December 12, 2006	1-4215-0535-5
22	February 25, 1999	4-08-847023-0	February 13, 2007	1-4215-0985-7
23	June 25, 1999	4-08-847074-5	April 10, 2007	1-4215-0986-5
24	October 25, 1999	4-08-847126-1	June 12, 2007	1-4215-0987-3
25	February 25, 2000	4-08-847178-4	August 14, 2007	1-4215-0988-1
26	June 23, 2000	4-08-847232-2	October 9, 2007	1-4215-0989-X
27	October 25, 2000	4-08-847288-8	December 11, 2007	1-4215-0990-3
28	March 23, 2001	4-08-847349-3	February 12, 2008	1-4215-1533-4
29	June 25, 2001	4-08-847380-9	April 8, 2008	1-4215-1716-7
30	October 25, 2001	4-08-847428-7	June 10, 2008	1-4215-1717-5
31	February 25, 2002	4-08-847470-8	August 12, 2008	1-4215-1718-3
32	June 25, 2002	4-08-847514-3	October 14, 2008	1-4215-1719-1
33	November 25, 2002	4-08-847568-2	December 9, 2008	1-4215-1720-5
34	March 25, 2003	4-08-847608-5	February 10, 2009	1-4215-2248-9
35	July 25, 2003	4-08-847646-8	April 14, 2009	1-4215-2249-7
36	January 23, 2004	4-08-847702-2	June 9, 2009	1-4215-2250-0
37	June 25, 2008	978-4-08-846305-6	October 13, 2009	1-4215-3087-2
