= List of Hayate the Combat Butler chapters =

First tankōbon volumes cover, released by Shogakukan on February 18, 2005

The chapters of the Hayate the Combat Butler manga series were written and illustrated by Kenjiro Hata. The manga was serialized in Shogakukan's shōnen manga magazine Weekly Shōnen Sunday from October 2004 to April 2017. Shogakukan collected its chapters in 52 tankōbon volumes, released from February 18, 2005, to June 16, 2017.

In North America, the manga has been licensed for English release by Viz Media. The first volume was released on November 21, 2006. As of September 8, 2026, 49 volumes have been released.

== Volumes ==
Note: Viz's official English-translated titles through volume 30, unofficial Japanese translations thereafter.

No.	Original release date	Original ISBN	English release date	English ISBN
1	February 18, 2005	978-4-09-127271-3	November 21, 2006	978-1-4215-0851-1
001. "Santa's Red is a Blood-Colored Hell" (サンタの赤は血の色地獄); 002. "In English, "Unmei" Means Destiny" (運命は、英語で言うとデスティニー); 003. "Observation of the Current State of Affairs and the Structure of the Maid Outfit" (状況説明とメイド服の構造に関する考察); 004. "Nagi Sanzenin and Her Chamber of Secrets" (三千院ナギと秘密の部屋); 005. "Even if You Become a Newtype, Silence Is a Virtue" (たとえニュータイプになろうとも、口は災いの元); 006. "Good Children Shouldn't Copy This!! No, Even Bad Children and Adults Shouldn't Copy This Either, Not Ever!" (良い子は色々マネすんな!! いや、悪い子でも大人でもダメ、ゼッタイ!); 007. "Won't Be Crying Out Love in the Center of the World, but in Other Words, the Beast Reigning at the Top of the Hierarchy" (世界の中心で別に愛は叫ばねーけどなんつーかヒエラルキーの頂点に君臨する獣); 008. "Hellbound with Neko-mimi Mode" (ネコミミ・モードで地獄行き); 009. "In the Language of Flowers, the St. John's Wort Fully Blooming in the Flower Garden Means 'Vengeance'" (その花園に咲きほこる弟切草の花言葉は復讐)
Hayate Ayasaki is a 16-year-old boy who has been supporting himself since childhood by working a variety of part-time jobs. His parents, on the other hand, are degenerate gamblers who don't work at all and generate 150 million yen in debt. To pay this debt, Hayate's parents sell him as an organ donor to the yakuza – an idea Hayate isn't too crazy about, so he decides to kidnap someone and ransom them for 150 million yen. The girl he attempts to kidnap, though, misinterprets Hayate's intentions, and thinks that he is confessing his love for her. The girl, Nagi Sanzenin, turns out to be the only daughter of a super wealthy family. Nagi buys Hayate from the yakuza and becomes her butler to pay her back. At his current salary, it will take him 40 years to pay Nagi back!
2	June 16, 2005	978-4-09-127272-0	February 13, 2007	978-1-4215-0852-8
010. "In the Wee Hours of a Full Moon Night, Roasting, Smashing and Grinding Them to Powder" (月夜の晩の丑三つ時に焼いてつぶして粉にする); 011. "The Mystery of Men Playing Shogi All the Time at the Foot of the Tsutenkaku Tower" (通天閣の下のおじさんたちはいつも将棋ばかりしている謎); 012. "The New 'Run Towards Our Sun!'" (新・僕らの太陽に向かって走れ!); 013. "Quest of the Avatar" (N/A); 014. "How Much is Your Life?" (N/A); 015. "A Way to Lose the Golden Feather" (黄金の羽のなくし方); 016. "Careless Kindness Brings Unhappiness" (不用意な優しさが不幸を呼ぶ); 017. "Bad Ending Flags in All Directions" (バッドエンド直行フラグ立ちまくり); 018. "Even a Fool Catches Cold, So Please Help Me, Nurse Angel, I'm Not Finished Yet!!" (バカでもカゼは引くから助けてナースエンジェル。まだまだいくよーっ!!); 019. "Night of the Servants" (使用人(かまい)たちの夜); 020. "When I Turned, I Remembered That Was the Beginning of Unhappiness" (振り返った時あれが不幸の始まりだったと思い出す)
Hayate's new career as a live-in butler for the mega-moneyed Sanzenin family is in full swing, but this job requires more than just mental fortitude and brute strength: he needs to be entertaining too. Whether it's standing up to fire-spewing robots or protecting his mistress's millions from her tycoon grandfather, Hayate must remain calm, composed, and hilarious at all times. The question now is whether Hayate will actually live long enough to pay off his debts ... and things aren't looking too good!
3	August 8, 2005	978-4-09-127273-7	May 8, 2007	978-1-4215-0853-5
021. "A Battle for Men" (男の戦い); 022. "The Tokyo Underground" (東京の地下鉄); 023. "The Kingdom of Ambition" (場合は、この王国野望); 024. "I Lost My Temper and Did It Because I Was Mortified About Losing to Little Kids on the Street. But, I Have no Regrets" (街中で子供に負けたのが悔しくてついカッとなってやった。でも後悔はしていない); 025. "A Nuisance, Even for Peter Pan" (ピーターパンもいい迷惑); 026. "Who Came Up with the Sound Effect, 'Kapok'? It's Awesome" (カポーンって擬音は誰が考えたんだろう? スゲーよね); 027. "I Never Had the Problem of Being Too Popular" (モテる苦労はした事ないなぁ〜); 028. "I Wanted to See the Challenge of the Super Shuffle" (スーパーシャッフルの挑戦が見たかった); 029. "By the Time Ojo-sama Cries" (お嬢さまのなく頃に); 030. "Wavering Hearts" (心を揺らして); 031. "I'm Hoping My Voice Will Reach You" (君にこの声が届きますように)
As if dealing with his mistress Nagi's outlandish demands weren't taxing enough, poor (yet perennially) hardworking Hayate has to suffer the ignominy of being challenged to a duel by Nagi's fiance Wataru Tachibana. With his saber at the ready, Hayate is prepared to defend himself ... but is there any logical reason why he's even fighting a duel in the first place? Should not the simple act of keeping the Sanzenin household spic-and-span be enough?
4	November 18, 2005	978-4-09-127274-4	August 14, 2007	978-1-4215-0854-2
032. "Hayate the Combat Butler" (N/A); 033. "If This Were an Anime, the Opening Would Change!" (アニメだったらオープニングがかわります!); 034. "If the Teacher Told You To Die, Would You?!" (先生が死ねと言ったらお前は死ぬんだな!?); 035. "Fools, Smoke, and Cats ... No One Wants to Climb Up to High Places" (バカもケムリも猫も高い所に登りたいわけじゃない); 036. "A Power That Won't Revolutionize the World" (世界を革命しない力); 037. "A Long Time Ago, Space Sheriff Gyaban Taught Us that Youth Is About Not Turning Back!" (僕らは昔、宇宙刑事に若さとは振り向かない事だと教わった!); 038. "The One Who Controls Summer Seems to Control the Entrance Exam" (夏を制する者は受験を制すらしいっすよ); 039. "Funny Bunny" (N/A); 040. "The First Class likes Curry" (一流はカレーが好き); 041. "Samurai, Bushido and Moving Van Damme" (サムライ、ブシドー、動くヴァンダム); Extra Episode. "Radical Dreamers" (N/A)
For full-time butler-in-debt Hayate, attending high school – even one tailor-made for his working class values – remains just a dream inside a dream, and the ritzy Hakuou Gakuin seems galaxies beyond his reach, especially since it is packed with the wealthiest students in Japan! Despite that, and in order to be a first-class butler, Hayate remains resolute in his desire to get an education, even if his new duties involve transporting his mistress's forever forgotten-at-home box lunch to class!
5	January 14, 2006	978-4-09-120030-3	November 13, 2007	978-1-4215-1167-2
042. "Defeated, but Still Fighting" (負けてもマケンドー); 043. "I Won't Forget You Were the Voice Actor in Art of Fighting" (龍虎の拳の声優をしていた事を僕は忘れない); 044. "Arrested for Breaking a Window at the School at Night" (夜の校舎の窓ガラス割ってタイホ); 045. "Elohim Essaim, Let's Recite a Charm!!" (エロイムエッサイム さぁ呪文を唱えよう!!); 046. "Mr. Cow, Mr. Cow! – What Is It Mr. Frog?" (ウシくん ウシくん!なんだい カエルくん?); 047. "I Like Reading Books, but I Don't Know How to Make Use of Them" (本は好きですが紙使いになれません); 048. "Let's Sing at Ryugujo" (歌え竜宮城); 049. "Saki-san's Ambition [National Edition]" (サキさんのヤボ用(全国版)); 050. "Raging Waves" (N/A); 051. "Titanic Episode 4 – With a Vengeance" (タイタニック エピソード4 WITH A VENGEANCE); 052. "Nagi – Andalusia's Winter" (ナギ・アンダルシアの冬)
To truly be considered a butler of the highest caliber, Hayate needs more than just punctuality, an unwavering sense of loyalty and the ability to keep his mistress out of tight situations – he will also need to develop the ultimate fighting technique! Despite his best efforts, though, our butler-in-debt seems incapable of keeping out of duels. Thankfully, this time it is a non-life-threatening kendo match. Will the path of the sword help guide Hayate toward true domestic enlightenment?
6	March 17, 2006	978-4-09-120128-7	February 12, 2008	978-1-4215-1520-5
053. "Give It Your Best, Nagi's – Special Training" (がんばれナギーズ 特訓中); 054. "It's Up to the Runner to Win the Race ..." (勝てるかどうかはランナーしだい ...); 055. "Like 'Run Jolie' ... Too-roo-roo ..." (走れジョリーのように トゥルルー); 056. "Tigers of Money" (マネーのとら); 057. "Many Kids Must Be in Trouble Since Train_Man Showed Their Parents What Comiket Is All About" (電車男のせいでコミケとはなんなのかが親などに知られ困っている子供は多いはず); 058. "Distance" (N/A); 059. "Ba-bump☆ My Butler Is My Idol?! The New Shojo Manga Series, Episode 1" (ドキッ☆ 憧れの人は私の執事!? という少女まんがの新連載1回目); 060. "One Who Is Darkness Beyond Twilight, I Will Turn You More Crimson Than Flowing Blood" (黄昏よりも暗き者 血の流れよりも赤くしてやる); 061. "The Vagabond's Ordeal – The Mysterious Dungeon for Dropout Butlers" (風来の試練 落第執事の不思議な迷宮(ダンジョン)); 062. "Hayate and the Colossus" (ハヤテと巨像); 063. "And It Won't Be a Legend" (そして伝説にならない)
With a prize of 150 million yen on the line, the traditional sports event at Hakuou Gakuin – the paired freestyle marathon – finally begins. Honor, pride, and even the fate of Hayate's employment are on the line, but how can he hope to win when his mistress Nagi would sooner French-kiss a king cobra than participate in anything remotely close to exercise?! What cruel mishap will befall the embattled Hayate this time – especially when victory is but a short jog away?
7	June 16, 2006	978-4-09-120417-2	May 13, 2008	978-1-4215-1682-0
064. "Maria-san's Honey-Sweet Lesson ... with Poison" (N/A); 065. "It Was a Mission to Move Through Snow Fields, Like in That Game, D2" (N/A); 066. "St. Valentine's Day: Classmate's Side – 'Shining☆ Days'" (N/A); 067. "St. Valentine's Day: House Side – 'You Are Similar to Me'" (N/A); 068. "There Are Things That Money Can't Buy. Priceless" (N/A); 069. "The Genius Teacher Who Isn't a Little Kid Came to School" (N/A); 070. "Go, Go Student Body Adventure" (N/A); 071. "Devil Hunter Hospitable Isumi" (N/A); 072. "It Was a More Serious Problem Than Conquering the World" (N/A); 073. "Heart To Heart" (N/A); 074. "My Sister is a First-Class Counselor" (N/A)
Valentine's Day is coming – a time for boys and girls to share their heartfelt sentiments with one another and to revel in the glories of young love. Ayumu, a former classmate of Hayate, has kept a flame burning for the adorably overworked butler-in-debt for some time. Is her chance for true happiness with a horrendously debt-ridden domestic finally at hand? Later, Nagi applies for her school's manga award but quickly learns that if her work is to be tempered with worldly experience, she will need to get her upper-class hands dirty – both literally and figuratively.
8	September 15, 2006	978-4-09-120580-3	August 12, 2008	978-1-4215-1683-7
075. "Good, Or Don't Be" (N/A); 076. "Your Place" (N/A); 077. "Nagi's Angels: Full Throttle" (N/A); 078. "Elevator Action Was Beyond the Comprehension of Those of Us That Couldn't Become Newtype" (N/A); 079. "Struggling with Jealousy!!! Ja-pan" (N/A); 080. "Running To Horizon" (N/A); 081. "Round Dance-Revolution-" (N/A); 082. "Why Do I Always Watch Princess Mononoke on TV? I Own It on DVD ..." (N/A); 083. "Protect Isumi ~ The Challengers ~ Tonight's Story Is About Ambitious Girls in Skirts" (N/A); 084. "Please Save My Earth with a 130 cm Dandy, Darling" (N/A); 085. "I Used to Think It Was Normal to Fish Like the Crazy Old Men of the Sea" (N/A)
For reasons of no major concern or importance, butler-in-debt Hayate has to leave the Sanzenin mansion for a three-day, two-night trip. Though he has no particular place to go or reason to be there, Hayate does have one thing that's rarely in his possession: money (one million yen from Maria, to be exact). Well, he thought he had some money. Steering clear of gambling should be easy enough, but will cash-strapped classmates and impromptu medical bills leave Hayate's billfold as bleak and barren as his future?
9	December 16, 2006	978-4-09-120696-1	November 11, 2008	978-1-4215-1950-0
086. "Unpretty Woman" (N/A); 087. "Riding a Mountain Bike ~ When I Went Shopping ~ I Realized That I Had No Wallet ~ But I Continued on Dating ~" (N/A); 088. "Successful Mission" (N/A); 089. "I Will" (N/A); 090. "The Range of Questions You Predicted Won't Be on the Test" (N/A); 091. "Moment" (N/A); 092. "Around the Time of the Hina Doll Festival ~ Spirited Away by the Demon ~" (N/A); 093. "The Magical Hayate Run-Run of Love" (N/A); 094. "The Wise Old Man of Union Theope Says,`Love And Hate Are the Same Thing'" (N/A); 095. "A Cruel, Foolish Man's Thesis" (N/A); 096. "I Alone Am Honored in Heaven and on Earth" (N/A)
Hayate owes a debt of gratitude to Hinagiku – the cute, sporty, and all around perfect-in-every-conceivable-way student body president – and as her March 3 birthday draws near, the bankrupt butler tries hard to come up with an appropriate present. But with final exams on the horizon, will he have time to prepare Hinagiku a heartfelt gift and pass his classes? Later, an ancient curse makes Hayate appear as if he's wearing women's clothing – and if it isn't broken, Hayate will be doomed to live out the rest of his days in drag! But, seeing as he looks really cute in a maid's uniform, maybe that is not a bad thing ...
10	February 16, 2007	978-4-09-121007-4	February 10, 2009	978-1-4215-2208-1
097. "Mind Education" (N/A); 098. "The Heady Feeling of Freedom" (N/A); 099. "Saki-san's Trifling Personal Errand (Warring Rival Episode)" (N/A); 100. "Congratulations ☆ 100th Episode! But This Is Actually the 99th Week, Because Two Episodes Were Published the First Week ..." (N/A); 101. "You Don't Have Enough Kung Fu ♥" (N/A); 102. "Well, Amuro Had a Place to Return to, But ..." (N/A); 103. "Once, Hotaru-chan Said, 'The One Who Takes Advantage of Others Will Be Taken Advantage of by Someone Else Someday ... '" (N/A); 104. "I Cried Out Loud on YOUR TUBE, and Now I Feel Great!" (N/A); 105. "If You Feel Sorry for Me, Then Give Me Money, plus a PS3 and an Xbox 360" (N/A); 106. "With All the Money You Spent on Sister Princess Merchandise, You Could Have Bought a Car" (N/A); 107. "A Lonesome War" (N/A)
Final exams are close at hand and Hayate can no longer afford to ignore his studies, but if he's hitting the books, who will keep the Sanzenin mansion spick and span? Anticipating just such an occasion, head butler Klaus arranges for Mecha Butler No. 13 to take Hayate's place. Fully automated and machine-engineered to domestic perfection, this new cybernetic manservant boasts a wide variety of dazzling features and capabilities, from performing soothing backrubs to giving Nagi candid advice on her latest manga. Is Hayate truly this easy to replace?
11	April 18, 2007	978-4-09-121029-6	May 12, 2009	978-1-4215-2209-8
108. "© Gosho Aoyama" (N/A); 109. "The Saginomiya Family" (N/A); 110. "The Sanzenin Ranking Kingdom ~ Is Ralph a Mecha or a Monster? ~" (N/A); 111. "Drop-Dead Chop!! And Kick & Punch!! And Finally, Uppercut" (N/A); 112. "Longing for the Railway" (N/A); 113. "When in Doubt, Just Paint it Red" (N/A); 114. "Run! Even if You're Not an Honest Person" (N/A); 115. "Run Together" (N/A); 116. "It's More Like a Dream than Being in a Real Dream" (N/A); 117. "Kiwa Kiwa Last Boy" (N/A); 118. "The Moon Is a Harsh Ojō-sama at Night" (N/A)
A meteor has fallen somewhere near the Izu Peninsula, an area well known for its relaxing hot spring resorts. The tourist trade is thrown into a tizzy when word leaks out that this meteor also seems to have imbued the local hot springs with cosmic powers, including (but not limited to) the ability to raise one's grades or increase one's bust size. Who in their right mind would let a divine opportunity like this slip by? Everyone, from butlers to their masters, are now booking their trips to Izu, so Hayate better pack his toothbrush – it is going to be a bumpy ride.
12	July 18, 2007	978-4-09-121157-6	August 11, 2009	978-1-4215-2210-4
119. "Nagi Sanzenin's Little Star Wars -Stardust Memory-" (N/A); 120. "It Was Momoi Who Was Referred to as Having Skin like an Eggshell After a Bath" (N/A); 121. "Goodbye, Mankind (Only Me)" (N/A); 122. "Voices of a Distant Star" (N/A); 123. "Someday ... Please Believe" (N/A); 124. "Just as Sp○der-Man Spends His Day Saving Human Lives Instead of Fighting Monsters like in the Movies, a Butler's Daily Life Is Much the Same" (N/A); 125. "What's the Thing That Will Make You Happy but You Don't Want to Buy for Yourself? Is It Hard to Find?" (N/A); 126. "People Say You Go There, You Can Make Any Kind of Cookies. Everyone Wants to Give Some, but the Meeting Place Is So Far" (N/A); 127. "Butter-Fly" (N/A); 128. "Future Century (Secret) Club" (未来世紀㊙倶楽部); 129. "It Was like the Sound of Gill's Flute" (N/A)
The Izu meteor may not have granted Nagi the pneumatic figure of her dreams, but it's left one surprise: a bug-eyed little alien girl looking for her lost spaceship. If Nagi helps she might score a biogenic reward, but will the grateful E.T. increase her bustline by 30 inches ... or her distance from Hayate by 30 million miles? Then, before you know it, it is White Day, when guys in Japan repay girls for all the chocolate the girls gave on Valentine's Day. And Hayate thought the yakuza got cranky about unpaid debts ...
13	October 18, 2007	978-4-09-121197-2	November 10, 2009	978-1-4215-2338-5
130. "Some Rurounin Said the Will to Live Is Stronger than Anything Else, but the Reality Is ..." (N/A); 131. "Is There Still a Service Called 'Smile, 0 Yen'?" (N/A); 132. "Better Fortune ☆ The Shrine of Ambition: No Appearance for the Katsura Sisters" (N/A); 133. "Catching the Dreams of the Bubble Economy in My Hand" (N/A); 134. "If I Die, Please Destroy My Hard Drive Without Viewing the Contents" (N/A); 135. "Rozen Maid. A Maid Created by Rozen. I Won't Let You Trash Her" (N/A); 136. "No Matter What Anyone Says, Your Own Cat Is The Cutest" (N/A); 137. "There's Someone with a Stronger Connection than ADSL or Fiber Optics" (N/A); 138. "Keep on Dreaming" (N/A); 139. "The Coffee Shops and Family Restaurants in Nerima and Suginami Are Full of Manga Artists, Editors and Animators" (N/A); 140. "The Maid Saw It and Has Been Seen" (N/A)
What makes a maid? When the ghostly priest who haunts the Sanzenin mansion (what, you forgot about the ghostly priest?) reveals that he can't rest in peace before fulfilling his last earthly wish, the ever-accommodating Hayate promises to help. Unfortunately, that wish is to hit on a nubile maid! Soon everyone – Hayate, of course, included – is struggling to master the arcane art of maid cosplay. And if that's not exciting enough to send you to Heaven, this volume also reveals the shocking secret origin of Nagi's pet tiger.
14	January 12, 2008	978-4-09-121268-9	March 16, 2010	978-1-4215-2645-4
141. "No Matter How High the Anticipation of a Great Punch Line, a Boy Must Live Up to a Girl's Expectations" (N/A); 142. "When You Think About It, Turning into an Animal when Your True Identity Is Revealed Is Scary" (N/A); 143. "Where We're Headed To" (N/A); 144. "Even in a Samurai Drama, a Person Usually Becomes Obedient when He Sees a Tattoo of Streaming Cherry Blossoms" (N/A); 145. "Distance—Even if It's Near" (N/A); 146. "Distance—Even if It's Far" (N/A); 147. "Hayate Once Upon a Time Story" (N/A); 148. "It's a Mystery How a Girl You Didn't Notice at the Beginning of the Term Starts Looking Cute by the End" (N/A); 149. "I Want to Go Hiking. I Really Want to Go. I Mean, I Want to Get Out of My Workplace" (N/A); 150. "A Child Is a Lost Child Because He's Lost. I'm Lost in Life. H-E-L-P ..." (N/A); 151. "A Wild Life. The Animals Are Unforgiving to Me" (N/A)
Nagi has done the one thing no one ever expected from the pampered heiress: gotten a job! But her first-ever day of work leaves her too exhausted to enjoy Sakuya's birthday party, an Osaka-style comedy spectacular where the birthday girl's friends are forced to perform before a massive audience. After a comedy buildup spanning several chapters and this cover text, can Hayate make 'em laugh?
15	April 18, 2008	978-4-09-121338-9	June 15, 2010	978-1-4215-2734-5
152. "Unnecessary Moe and Necessary Courage" (N/A); 153. "A Sun Went Down Behind the Distant Mountain and Also Down into the Valley" (N/A); 154. "Tremble, My Heart! Scorching Heat So Hot! Well, Something like That" (N/A); 155. "Saki-san's Personal Errand (Warlord Battle Chronicle)" (N/A); 156. "Sleepless at 2:00 A.M., Broke the Door in Irritation" (N/A); 157. "Can't Live Hiding in the Dark" (N/A); 158. "The Reality of High School Life Is Quite Different from the Ideal" (N/A); 159. "Dangerous Walking" (N/A); 160. "A Kotatsu Is Superb During a Cold Winter" (N/A); 161. "Sure, All My Otoshidama Is Gone, but the Memories Will Never Fade" (N/A); 162. "You Know the DS Game That Lets You Practice How to Smile? Maybe You Can Make Use of That ..." (N/A)
While cleaning house, Hayate and Maria stumble upon a heretofore unmentioned, enormous jungle-themed sauna, and promptly get lost in it. After that hot, steamy adventure--complete with misplaced articles of maid clothing--it's time to cool down, as Nagi tries to cure her insomnia with a dip in the mansion's equally massive pool. Too bad she can't swim!
16	July 11, 2008	978-4-09-121427-0	September 14, 2010	978-1-4215-2783-3
163. "Bad Luck Still Brings Bad Luck" (災いは転じても災い); 164. "Magical Labyrinth" (N/A); 165. "The Wandering Path of the Otaku" (オタクの迷い道); 166. "I Can Straighten You Out" (私が貴女を矯正してあげてもいい); 167. "Enough is Enough for an Unforgettable Memory" (忘れられない思い出にも程がある); 168. "When You're Tired, Just Sleep and Try Again" (疲れてる時は、寝てがんばれ); 169. "Even if You Saw It, It's Very Important to Pretend You Didn't" (見えても、そっとしておく事が大事です); 170. "'Asano-san, What You Said Earlier Was Meant in a Positive Way, Right?' 'Of Course! I'm Just Fooling Around, KAMI☆STA!'" (｢浅野さん、さっきのはいい意味で言ったんだよね?｣｢もちろん!｣誤解を生みがち、カミ☆スタ!); 171. "When You Beat the Bushes, Snakes Appear, Corpses Appear, Nothing Good Happens" (藪をつつくとヘビが出る。死体とかも出る。ろくな事がない); 172. "No Definite Plans" (予定は未定); 173. "For Now, Try Discussing It with Body Language" (とりあえず話し合いは肉体語でやってみる)
NOT a dream! NOT an imaginary story! Hayate and Hinagiku are on a date! Trouble is, each one thinks the other one hates them. But when Hayate busts out his surprisingly l33t dating skills, not even a trip to the world's worst movie theater can ruin the couple's night out. Later that night, Hayate's sleep is interrupted by girl after girl climbing into his bed. Could our perpetually unfortunate butler's luck be changing, at least where the ladies are concerned? Alas, probably not ...
17	October 17, 2008	978-4-09-121479-9	March 8, 2011	978-1-4215-3067-3
174. "Even if the Law Says You Can't, You Still Want to See it" (法律でダメって言われても、観たい気持ちは消えない); 175. "You Bump Into Everyone You Need in Life" (人生に必要な人とはだいたい出会うようにできている); 176. "Tears and Sweat Under The Mask Aren't Shown Because They Are Heroes" (仮面の下の涙も汗も、ヒーローだから見せられない); 177. "It's a Device That Captures Moments With Light" (それは、光で時を切り取る機械); 178. "The End of the World (1): The World That You Desired" (THE END OF THE WORLD(1) 君が望んだ三千世界); 179. "The End of the World (2): The Castle Where Gods Rest" (THE END OF THE WORLD(2) 神さまが棲むという城); 180. "The End of the World (3): Miniature Garden of the Sun Goddess" (THE END OF THE WORLD(3) 天照の箱庭); 181. "The End of the World (4): Reach the World With Your Voice" (THE END OF THE WORLD(4) 世界に届く声で); 182. "The End of the World (5): Omen at the End" (THE END OF THE WORLD(5) 終わりへの予兆); 183. "The End of the World (6): The Will for Power" (THE END OF THE WORLD(6) 力への意志); 184. "The End of the World (7): The Love Oath on the Left Hand" (THE END OF THE WORLD(7) 左手に愛を誓い)
By now Hayate's nigh-total awesomeness is a matter of public record. But how did he come to master the twin disciplines of housekeeping and martial arts? In the flashback to end all flashbacks, we journey back to Hayate's hapless childhood and his cryptic encounter with the girl who would change his life forever. Be forewarned--the drama tag will be pulled.
18	January 16, 2009	978-4-09-121566-6	September 13, 2011	978-1-4215-3347-6
185. "The End of the World (8): The Birth of the Lord of Hatred" (THE END OF THE WORLD(8) 憎悪の王の誕生); 186. "The End of the World (9): Don't Call Me Anymore" (THE END OF THE WORLD(9) もう届かない声で); 187. "The End of the World (10): Someday, When The Rain Ceases" (THE END OF THE WORLD(10) いつか、雨が上がったら); 188. "The Moment for Arranging the Vacation Plan is the Most Enjoyable One" (休みは計画を立てている時が一番楽しい); 189. "The Person Who is Loved is the One Who is Worried. Also, the Holy God is Said to be Dead" (愛ゆえに人は苦しむと聖帝も言ってたしね); 190. "The Lively Couple in a So-called 'Date'. It'll be Nice if no Awful Thing Like a Disease Called Stomachache Occurs" (イチャイチャしているカップルがデートとかするともれなくちょっと腹痛になるという病気が発生すればいいのに ...); 191. "A Date is Fun. Or Rather, I Mean Going Out With a Girl is Basically Fun" (デートは楽しい。ていうか女の子と一緒なら基本的に楽しい); 192. "Who Would Say a Joke That He Likes a Girl Who is Full of Opens?" (スキのある女の子がスキというダジャレを言うのはダレジャ); 193. "Ah ... At Any Rate, Even the Prime Minister Said He Wants Money, Right?" (ああ ... それにしても金が欲しいって帝愛の会長も言ってたしね); 194. "Quiz Magic Hamdemi" (クイズ マジック ハムデミー); 195. "I Wanna Know Because I Don't Know. Now I Don't Know But I'll Know Later. That's The Quiz Game Life" (わからないから わかりたい。わかってないけど わかってしまう。そういうクイズな人生ゲーム)
The cast gears up for the mother of all Golden Week vacations. Hayate sunning in the Mediterranean? Our hero's story truly is a classic tale of rags to ... well, substantially less shoddy rags. But what about the students who don't work as manservants to the super-wealthy? Well, they'll just have to win vacation tickets in a game show or hit the jackpot in Vegas. That could happen, right?
19	April 17, 2009	978-4-09-121895-7	February 7, 2012	978-1-4215-3348-3
196. "Suffocation – Explosion – Adventure" (切なさ炸裂アドベンチャー); 197. "If You Feel Like You Have Become a Little Greater When You Wake Up Early in the Morning ... Then You Are Imagining Things" (朝早く起きるとちょっと自分がエラくなったような気がする ... という気のせい); 198. "The Strongest Halberd and The Strongest Shield Are Made to Fight Each Other" (最強の矛と盾は相いれないようにできている); 199. "Nothing Will Happen As You Expect it to!! Nothing!! That's Just Your Delusion!!" (期待通りに行く事などない!! ないのだ!! それは妄想だ!!); 200. "Gravity Can Draw Souls in But People Can Fly From Narita" (重力に魂は引かれても成田から人は飛べる); 201. "No Matter What They Say, People Want to Be Loved More Than To Love" (なんだかんだ言っても人間は愛するよりも愛されたいのだ!); 202. "In a Love Comedy, a Bathroom is a Battleground. You Will Die if You Come Unprepared." (おフロ場はラブコメでは戦場。油断すると死ぬ); 203. "It's more profitable not to gamble." (博打はしない方が儲かる); 204. "I Caught a Cold ... My Throat Hurts ..." (カゼひいた ... ノド痛い ...); 205. "You are not supposed to say "funny you should mention that. It's not a Dream!!" (｢ところがどっこい夢じゃありませーん!!｣とは言わない); 206. "A Free Guy is Strong, Unreasonably Strong" (フリーダムな奴は強い。理不尽に強い)
It's the moment fans have been waiting for: Hayate and Maria, alone in the mansion! Will the world's most spectacular butler and maid, respectively, doff their prim-and-proper manners and get busy at last? Probably not, but that doesn't mean Hayate's other love interests can rest easy. When Nagi fears that her "romance" with Hayate is growing stale, she vows to kick the relationship into high gear. Either her secret love techniques will work wonders, or Hayate will wind up cross-dressing again, so it's a win-win situation for the readers ...
20	July 17, 2009	978-4-09-121698-4	September 11, 2012	978-1-4215-3349-0
207. "There's No Way to Ensure Victory on a Spinning Roulette. There is if You Don't Spin it, Though" (回るルーレットに必勝法はない。回るないならある); 208. "Not Winning at Gambling Can Cause All Sorts of Problems" (博打は勝たないと色々大変); 209. "Limited Edition Goods Are a Pain For the People Who Make Them, Too" (限定グッズは作る方も実は大変); 210. "That's the Memory of a Kiss" (それはキッスの記憶); 211. "RADICAL DREAMERS: REAL SIDE" (N/A); 212. "To Wish Upon a Star, To Pray" (あの星に願うように、祈るように); 213. "A Push Towards Making Things Even More Triangular" (トライアングラーをさらに倍プッシュだ); 214. "Door Towards the Myth" (神話への扉); 215. "Mykonos Labyrinth Medley" (ミコノス迷宮組曲); 216. "The Seal of the Labyrinth" (迷宮の封印); 217. "Love Labyrinth" (恋愛迷宮)
Wataru and Saki have flown to Vegas on a Golden Week vacation that they can't afford, with the deeply questionable plan of winning the money for a ticket back home. Instead, Saki finds herself playing the Strip's most ruthless card shark—Wataru's reprobate mother—with Wataru as collateral. There's plenty of fear and loathing in Las Vegas tonight, but at least things are going better for Hayate and Nagi, sunning with their friends on the Greek isles. That is, until they stumble into an honest-to-goodness labyrinth ...
21	October 16, 2009	978-4-09-121779-0	February 12, 2013	978-1-4215-3350-6
218. "The Stone of Bonds" (絆の石); 219. "We Are Not Innovators! Our Minds Cannot Be Transmitted to Each Other Well" (イノベイターではない僕らの心はお互いうまく伝わらない); 220. "The Time to Forget Your Troubles Has Come. The Memory Mechanism Is Still Scientifically Unclear" (トラブルは忘れた頃にやってくる); 221. "Because You Go to the Beach, There's Something You Have to Do" (ビーチに来たからにはやる事がある); 222. "Love Makes People Run in Odd Directions And Then They Want to Die" (恋は人をおかしな方向に走らせる。後で死にたくなる); 223. "Winning And Happiness Are Equal But Not Linked" (勝つことと幸せはイコールで結ばれない); 224. "Getting a Girl Into a Good Mood Is Difficult, But Important" (女の子のご機嫌をとるのは大変。でも大事); 225. "And Yet I Shouldn't Be Doing It" (それでも僕はやってないはず); 226. "The Living Things Known as Girls Are Naturally Strong" (女の子という生き物は普通に強い); 227. "Like Shadows Overlapping Each Other in the Sunset" (夕日で重なる影のように); 228. "Memories Transcend Time" (思い出は時を超えて)
22	January 16, 2010	978-4-09-122135-3	September 10, 2013	978-1-4215-3905-8
229. "No Matter When, No Matter How Many Times" (いつも何度でも); 230. "I'm Doing it That Way" (そういう風にできている); 231. "Beyond the Bounds" (ビヨンド ザ バウンズ); 232. "Beautiful World" (ビューティフル ワールド); 233. "Dearest" (ディアレスト); 234. "I Would Remember Even After a Thousand Years" (千年経っても覚えている); 235. "To the Waning Moon in the Sky" (月の欠けた空に); 236. "I Can't Figure It Out From Incomplete Information" (一を聞いて十を知らない); 237. "And Night Once Again Comes" (そして再び夜が来て); 238. "I Can't Put it in Words" (言葉にならない); 239. "Silky Heart" (シルキー ハート)
23	April 16, 2010	978-4-09-122256-5	February 11, 2014	978-1-4215-3906-5
240. "My Feelings For You" (君への想うを); 241. "The Shield of Aegis" (アエギスの盾); 242. "Feelings in the Night" (夜に想う); 243. "Thoughts Over His Defenseless Sleeping Face" (スキだらけの寝顔に想う); 244. "Even Though I Love You, Because I Love You" (好きだけど 好きだから); 245. "Love Me Tender" (ラブ ミー テンダー); 246. "The Strongest Vs. The Invincible" (最強vs無敵); 247. "The Power of the Distant Land" (天涯の力); 248. "Her Choice" (彼女の選択); 249. "The Final Decision" (究極の選択); 250. "The Beginning of the Final Day" (終わる日の始まり)
24	April 16, 2010	978-4-09-122257-2	September 9, 2014	978-1-4215-3907-2
251. "Shining in the Night" (夜に光る); 252. "From Now On" (ここから先の未来); 253. "Proof" (プルーフ); 254. "And the Final Confrontation" (そして最後の対決); 255. "The First Word" (一つ目の言葉); 256. "Question at Me" (クェション アット ミー); 257. "Someone Loves You" (誰かが君を); 258. "For Eternity, For You" (永遠のために君のために); 259. "〜Fly High〜" (〜フライ ハイ〜); 260. "Eternal Wind" (エターナル ウインド); 261. "Flirt and Flutter" (イチャイチャイチャイチャ)
25	August 18, 2010	978-4-09-122512-2	February 10, 2015	978-1-4215-7678-7
262. "The End of the World (11): Ally of Justice" (THE END OF THE WORLD(11) 正義の味方); 263. "The End of the World Final: A Smile to You" (THE END OF THE WORLD FINAL 微笑みを君に); 264. "The Toll of The Bell Rings Into The Future" (鐘の音は未来に響く); 265. "The Wind Calling Forth The Buds of Spring" (木の芽風); 266. "And Then We'll Smile" (そして笑顔になる); 267. "Student Council President Has Donkey's Ears!!" (会長の耳はロバの耳!!); 268. "The Long Story is Over. How About You Read The Story From Here On, Too?" (長いシリーズも終わったし、この話から読むのもいいんじゃね?); 269. "When We Were Young We Were Shocked to Learn About The Secret of Living Game's Izumi-chan" (若い頃の僕らはりびんぐゲームでいずみちゃんの秘密を知りショックを受けたりもした); 270. "No Matter What Kind of a Building or Old Man, They Have Their Own Histories" (どんな建物にもオッサンにも歴史はある); 271. "Wearing the Maid Uniform Does Not Make You a Maid. You Wear the Maid Uniform Because You Have the Abilities of a Maid" (メイド服を着るからメイドさんなのではない。メイドとしての能力があるからめいど服を着るのだ); 272. "Plenty of Bathroom Incidents Happen In Romantic Comedy Manga Aimed at Boys" (少年まんがのラブコメは風呂場で事件がよく起こる)
26	November 18, 2010	978-4-09-122659-4	September 8, 2015	978-1-4215-7787-6
273. "*Heartbeat* ♥ It's an Operation ★ To Make the Maidens' Hearts Flutter ♥ Or Something Like That" (ドキッ♥乙女心★ときめき大作戦♥とかなんやかんや); 274. "Meow Meow Meow Meow Meoooow" (にゃにゃにゃにゃにゃーーん); 275. "Meoow Meoow Meow Meow Meow Meow Meow Meow Meow Meooow ♡" (にゃんにゃん にゃにゃにゃにゃにゃにゃにゃ にゃーん♡); 276. "Miaooow ♡" (ニャーーン♡); 277. "Family Ties and Other Connections Can Be Found Here" (エンもユカリもこの場所で); 278. "Dreadful Power of Privileges" (特典の恐るべき力); 279. "I Want to Meet Someone Who Has Looked Upon Me Kindly" (やさしい目をした誰かに会いたいね); 280. "It's DESTINY" (N/A); 281. "My Birthday is October 19. I'm a Libra." (僕の誕生日は10月19日です。てんびん座です); 282. "Happy Birthday to Me" (私にハッピーバースデー); 283. "Most Effort is for the Sake of Staying With Someone" (たいていの苦労は誰かの側にいるためにある)
27	February 18, 2011	978-4-09-122781-2	February 9, 2016	978-1-4215-7788-3
284. "Trouble, Shock, Suspense" (ピンチ！ショック！サスペンス！); 285. "No Matter How Far You Go, You Will Never Be High End, But ..." (どこまで行ってもハイエンドにはならないが ...); 286. "She Has Come to Steal Something Precious of Mine" (やつは大事なものを盗んでィきましたとさ); 287. "Mask" (マスク); 288. "Challenge at 13 Years Old" (チャレンジ13歳); 289. "I'd Like For You to Think That All Manga Artists Are Like This!" (すべてのまんが家がこうだと思ってもらいたい!); 290. "If I Sought After the Gandhara Kingdom, I Could Go Far Far Away" (ガンだーラは求めれば遠ざかるように出来ている); 291. "Anyone Worries When They Are Out of Sight of Others" (どんな人でも見えない所で悩んでる); 292. "I Meet You" (君と出会う); 293. "chAngE" (N/A); 294. "Renaissance Passion" (ルネッサンス、情熱)
28	May 17, 2011	978-4-09-122870-3	September 13, 2016	978-1-4215-8387-7
295. "As The Coincidences Pile Up, People Will Run Into Someone Else" (偶然に偶然を重ねて人は誰かと出会う?); 296. "Luca" (ルカ?); 297. "You&Me" (N/A); 298. "Idol Master" (アイドルマスター?); 299. "Don't Stop! Dreamer on the Road!" (N/A); 300. "The Return of the King" (王の帰還?); 301. "A Child Can Be the Bond Between Two People. Even If They Haven't Bonded Yet" (子はかすがいかもしれない。まだかすがってないけど?); 302. "Come to My Place" (ウチにおいでよ?); 303. "An Ordinary Life That KyoAni Wouldn't Turn Into an Anime" (京アニがアニメ化とかしない方の日常?); 304. "That River Next to Akihabara is the Kanda River" (秋葉原の側にあるあの川が神田川なんだよ?); 305. "You Meet a Lot of People Marriage Hunting When Drawing Storyboards at a Café" (喫茶店とかでネーム描いてると婚活している人によく会います?)
29	August 10, 2011	978-4-09-941703-1	February 14, 2017	978-1-4215-8688-5
306. "It's an Option That Comes Default on Little Blonde Girls" (金髪幼女にはデフォルトでついてるオプションです); 307. "I Want to Become an Oil Magnate" (石油王になりたい); 308. "Carelessness Means Acting Carelessly in Careless Moments" (うっかりは、うっかりしている時にうっかりする); 309. "The Honorific "Onee-san" is Filled With Romance" (敬語お姉さんが恋愛で満たされて); 310. "Strong Feelings, Strong Love. Are These Feelings Real?" (強い気持ち強い愛。今のその気持ちホントかなぁ?); 311. "Nobody Wanted To Lie Initially" (誰も始めからウソツキになりたかったわけじゃない); 312. "Karaoke Is Enjoyable Even If You're Singing Alone" (カラオケは一人でも楽しい); 313. "It's Not That I Wanted to Fool Her. When I Think About Her, It Makes Me Lie Just a Little Bit" (別にだましたいんじゃない。相手の事を想うがあまり、ほんの少しだけ人はウソをついてしまうのです); 314. "Overlapping Lies and Life" (重なる嘘と人生); 315. "The Problem is That I Love Him Despite That" (それでも好きだから困る); 316. "Don't Move Another Step" (もうお前一歩も動くな)
30	October 18, 2011	978-4-09-159105-0	September 12, 2017	978-1-4215-9448-4
317. "If it's Important, keep it with you" (大事なら持っとけ); 318. "Sign" (N/A); 319. "Crappy Adviser" (ポンコツアドバイザー); 320. "Let's Do Our best in Various Ways" (色々がんばろう); 321. "High Spec Adviser" (ハイスペックアドバイザー); 322. "The Next Thing I Knew, I Has Up to My Waist" (気がつけば腰までドロにつかってた); 323. "Heaven is a Place on Earth" (｢働きたくないでござる!｣とはいっても働いてしまう。); 324. "How the Maid Kills Time" (メイドさんのヒマつぶし); 325. "An Artisan's Technique Seasoning with Salt" (匠の技、塩の塩梅); 326. "After having done it, he wasn't able to take the initiative to do it, was he?" (やらかしちゃった後に); 327. "Goodbye Happiness" (N/A)
31	December 16, 2011	978-4-09-123438-4	February 13, 2018	978-1-4215-9709-6
328. "We still have not received the pay for the assistant work we did that day" (あの日したアシスタント代を僕達はまだもらっていない?); 329. "Tennage dream" (早起きのコツは早寝する事?); 330. "Hello America!" (君が好きだと叫びたい?); 331. "It is as Quiet as 200 Million Years ago, Isn't it?" (二億年前のように静かだね); 332. "A Genius's Strategy" (天才の戦略); 333. "Something Special" (特別な何か); 334. "Identity Crisis" (N/A); 335. "2012" (サンタの教え); 336. "ROCK OVER JAPAN" (N/A); 337. "The Bad Timing Of A Maid's Sulking is Intentional" (スネた間の悪さもそれもメイドのタイミング); 338. "Hehe, Shuddup!" (毎日コツコツ続ける事が大事)
32	May 18, 2012	978-4-09-123666-1	September 11, 2018	978-1-4215-9772-0
339. "A Single Yen Can Make One Laugh or Cry" (1円に泣いたり笑ったり); 340. "Hinagiku-San's Wish Does Not Seem As If It Will Be Granted Even If She Uses The Holy Grail" (ヒナギクさんの願いは聖杯を使っても叶いそうにない); 341. "A Maid Will Not Be Found For Isumu-San Until 23Rd Century" (伊澄さんのメイドさんは23世紀まで見つからない); 342. "Thus Spoke Tsurugino Kayura" (剣野カユラ、かく語りき); 343. "Thus Spoke Tsurugino Kayura 2" (剣野カユラ、かく語りき②); 344. "Thus Spoke Tsurugino Kayura 3" (剣野カユラ、かく語りき③); 345. "You All Need To Be Careful, Too." (みんなも気をつけてね。気がつくと地雷踏んじゃってる事ってあるから。マジで); 346. "And The Butler Made Them" (そして執事はそれを作ったとさ); 347. "Are You A Magnet Or Something?" (お前、磁石かなんかなのかよっ！！); 348. "Chef Marias' Summer Vegetable Special Round 1" (シェフ・マリアの夏野菜スペシャル第1弾); 349. "I Don't Want to Think about Getting Fat Anymore" (太るとかもう考えたくない)
33	September 18, 2012	978-4-09-123798-9	January 8, 2019	978-1-4215-9866-6
350. "I Don't Have Many Memories of My School Life" (学校の思い出とかあんまない); 351. "Do I or Do I Not Need to Be Able to Just Do This Kind of Thing to Be Popular?" (モテるためにはこういう事がサラッとできる必要があるとかないとか); 352. "Illness begins in the mind. That means you will get sick if you neglect your mind." (病は気から。気を抜くと病気になると言う意味); 353. "He Caught A Cold Because He is No Longer An Idiot" (バカじゃなくなったからカゼをひく); 354. "A Dead Flag and You are the One Raising It" (死亡フラグ。上がっているのはお前); 355. "This is What You Get when You Cream all the Needed Information for Major Financial Success into 16 Pages" (大きな経済的成功を得るために必要な情報を16ページでまとめるとこうなる); 356. "Even with Three Heads, 'Hmm ... I Dunno' is all the Three can Come up with" (三人寄ってもう～ん ... どうなんやろ ... って三人で悩むだけ); 357. "Cycling Yahoo!" (サイクリング ヤッホー); 358. "To be Blunt, I am an S at the Core. Also, Never do what I do!!" (ぶっちゃけ根はどSなのです。あと絶対マネしちゃダメ！！); 359. "I Am Still Unsure What Kind Of Adult I Will Be In The Future" (今まで将来どんな大人になるか迷う); 360. "She Sees The Identity of The Ghost, Yet She Does Not" (幽霊の正体見たり、見なかったり)
34	October 18, 2012	978-4-09-123888-7	September 10, 2019	978-1-9747-0566-5
361. "The Behavior of Mothers is More or Less The Same Everywhere" (オカンの行動はどこも大体、同じ); 362. "The Day The Dolphin Flew" (イルカの飛んだ日); 363. "Mystery Room (1)" (ミステリールーム (1)); 364. "Mystery Room (2)" (ミステリールーム (2)); 365. "Mystery Room (3)" (ミステリールーム (3)); 366. "Mystery Room (4)" (ミステリールーム (4)); 367. "Mystery Room (5)" (ミステリールーム (5)); 368. "Mystery Room (6)" (ミステリールーム (6)); 369. "Mystery Room (7)" (ミステリールーム (7)); 370. "Mystery Room (8)" (ミステリールーム (8)); 371. "Not Trying to be Popular is a Shortcut to Being Popular" (モテようと思わない事がモテるための近道)
35	January 18, 2013	978-4-09-124030-9	February 11, 2020	978-1-9747-0567-2
372. "Think a Bit About How You Say Things" (N/A); 373. "Pros Are Amazing In My Field" (N/A); 374. "Yahoo! Garbage Needs to Be Disinfected!!" (N/A); 375. "Written as Human Dreams, Read as Fleeting" (N/A); 376. "You Can Make a Debut at Any Point in Your Life" (N/A); 377. "A Family Restaurant Is a Human Scramble" (N/A); 378. "Some Other Stuff" (N/A); 379. "The character for painful needs just a bit more to become the character for happiness" (N/A); 380. "Nothing in Life is Better Than The Excitement of The First Day of Summer Break" (N/A); 381. "That is What It is to be a Man, That is What It is to be Young, Brother Gavan" (N/A); 382. "Strange Lovers" (N/A)
36	March 18, 2013	978-4-09-124207-5	August 11, 2020	978-1-9747-1497-1
383. "An Incident That Does Not End With Only A Kiss" (N/A); 384. "Juspion Taught Me There is Only One of Me in the Universe" (N/A); 385. "There Are Various Battles You Cannot Allow Yourself To Lose" (N/A); 386. "Right Now Love Cannot Be Stopped" (N/A); 387. "This is The Kind Of Manga You Are Reading" (N/A); 388. "This is Probably When You Would Hear The Term Nyoo ... .!!" (N/A); 389. "Deja Vuing and Not Deja Vuing" (N/A); 390. "There is Only One Moon In The Sky" (N/A); 391. "Anime Store Manager in Love" (N/A); 392. "Like an Idiot Flying into a Flame" (N/A); 393. "A Mother's Timing is Perfect" (N/A)
37	June 18, 2013	978-4-09-124316-4	February 9, 2021	978-1-9747-1931-0
394. "Nishizawa Ayumu's Heated Classroom" (N/A); 395. "I am not Bored. I Have Plenty To Do. Like Take Care of Cat" (N/A); 396. "To Be Strong is to Keep One's Promises" (N/A); 397. "Terrible Manga Dojo (Reverse Side)" (N/A); 398. "Kyoto and Ise – Conclusion (Night 1): The Idiot Who Leaves on a Trip" (N/A); 399. "Kyoto and Ise – Conclusion (Night 2): Trouble Exists in Various Places" (N/A); 400. "Kyoto and Ise – Conclusion (Night 3): This is supposed to be Night 3, but this is the 400th chapter so let's celebrate! Seriously" (N/A); 401. "Kyoto and Ise – Conclusion (Night 4): Viewing Hell with Some Hellish Experiences" (N/A); 402. "Kyoto and Ise – Conclusion (Night 5): A Truly Lost Child On Midnight Thunder Road" (N/A); 403. "Starting Today, I am ..." (N/A); 404. "Kyoto and Ise – Conclusion (Night 6): Like a Prayer" (N/A)
38	September 18, 2013	978-4-09-124379-9	September 14, 2021	978-1-9747-1498-8
405. "Kyoto and Ise – Conclusion (Night 7): Hinagiku and Chiharu's Honest Stroll" (N/A); 406. "Kyoto and Ise – Conclusion (Night 8): There is No Method of Earning 100 Million in a Single Second" (N/A); 407. "Kyoto and Ise – Conclusion (Night 9): Make The Victory Crown Shine Yourself" (N/A); 408. "Ahh, I Want a Meal" (N/A); 409. "Kyoto and Ise – Conclusion (Night 10): I'm Hungry" (N/A); 410. "Kyoto and Ise – Conclusion (Night 11): I Have No Luck. I'm Not Onboard With This Either" (N/A); 411. "Kyoto and Ise – Conclusion (Night 12): I Will Definitely Protect You ..." (N/A); 412. "Kyoto and Ise – Conclusion (Night 13): There are All Sorts of People" (N/A); 413. "Kyoto and Ise – Conclusion (Night 14): Conclusion" (N/A); 414. "Battlefields are Tedious" (N/A); 415. "Even If You Ask Me To Choose Between Them ... In a Way, The Ultimate Dilemma Has Arrived." (N/A)
39	December 18, 2013	978-4-09-124510-6	February 8, 2022	978-1-9747-2495-6
416. "Which Ad Was It, That Said Freedom To Choose Your Occupation" (N/A); 417. "In Our Hearts" (N/A); 418. "Fragments of Dreams" (N/A); 419. "To Those Hesitantly Outstretched Fingers" (N/A); 420. "That Which I Can Grasp in These Hands" (N/A); 421. "What Makes You Happy" (N/A); 422. "We Shimmer In The Hot Air" (N/A); 423. "Termination" (N/A); 424. "Something Special" (N/A); 425. "I'Ve Got To Ride" (N/A); 426. "Destroy The Invisible Wall" (N/A)
40	March 18, 2014	978-4-09-124578-6	September 20, 2022	978-1-9747-2496-3
427. "No Regrets" (N/A); 428. "We Will Race In To The Sky" (N/A); 429. "Ten Years From Now" (N/A); 430. "Shining Brightly" (N/A); 431. "Fireworks" (N/A); 432. "Shining Brightly" (N/A); 433. "Those Stones Were Once Considered More Valuable Than Gold" (N/A); 434. "The See-Through Playing Cards, Come With Volume 39's Limited Edition" (N/A); 435. "Memory of a Dream" (N/A); 436. "A Dream About Santa Claus" (N/A); 437. "Plans And Expectations Are Nothing But One's Imagination" (N/A)
41	June 18, 2014	978-4-09-124665-3	February 21, 2023	978-1-9747-2497-0
438. "Attention, Please" (N/A); 439. "Ah! There is No Rosiness in This Strange Life" (N/A); 440. "I Want To Meet Ika-Chan" (N/A); 441. "Talking About Liking Octopuses" (N/A); 442. "With You Always" (N/A); 443. "Troublesome Relative" (N/A); 444. "This is Not A Sign That The Protagonist Will Lose" (N/A); 445. "We Still Don't Know The Name of the Flower We Ate That Day and Then You Usually Get A Stomachache" (N/A); 446. "A Love Comedy Without The Comedy" (N/A); Special. "Investor Y" (N/A); 447. "In Ten Years, You'll be a Big Shot, Probably" (N/A)
42	September 18, 2014	978-4-09-125104-6	September 19, 2023	978-1-9747-2498-7
448. "Assassin from the Past (Circa Volume 15)" (N/A); 449. "Or So Proposal" (N/A); 450. "Make Sure to Enter" (N/A); 451. "I Love Curry" (N/A); 452. "I Like the Strawberry Häagen" (N/A); 453. "About The Brother" (N/A); 454. "About The Younger Brother" (N/A); 455. "Love Stories Happen Surprisingly Suddenly" (N/A); 456. "I Can't Do What I Can't Do" (N/A); 457. "Ten Year Gap" (N/A); 458. "Give a Troublesome Person Something Troublesome And Only Trouble Can Follow" (N/A)
43	December 18, 2014	978-4-09-125397-2	February 13, 2024	978-1-9747-2499-4
459. "Stone of Bonds" (N/A); 460. "The Sea is With Us" (N/A); 461. "And Sometimes See a Movie" (N/A); 462. "Explaining It Again" (N/A); 463. "Dede de de de de! De!! Myon myon myon" (N/A); 464. "A Story of Needless Breasts" (N/A); 465. "A Showdown 8 Months (10 Years) in the Making" (N/A); 466. "Time of Destruction" (N/A); 467. "Daily Life" (N/A); 468. "See You Again, Hero" (N/A); 469. "Recycling Day can be Easy to Forget" (N/A)
44	March 18, 2015	978-4-09-125677-5	November 12, 2024	978-1-9747-2500-7
470. "Santa's Red is a Blood-Colored Hell" (サンタの赤は血の色地獄2014); 471. "That is His Ability" (N/A); 472. "The Schemer Drowns in Her Schemes" (N/A); 473. "Advice That Comes with a Bad Feeling" (N/A); 474. "Kittens and Girls are Cute" (N/A); 475. "Cuteness is Justice" (N/A); 476. "I Love Kitties" (N/A); 477. "Late Night Diner ← Effective Midday Café ← Worthless" (N/A); 478. "In Search of a Love Comedy" (N/A); 479. "Rice Is a Side Dish" (N/A); 480. "Being a Girl is Tough" (N/A)
45	June 18, 2015	978-4-09-125850-2	February 11, 2025	978-1-9747-2501-4
481. "This is What Happens When a Normal Person Tries" (N/A); 482. "Committed to the Result" (N/A); 483. "It's Unclear If This is the Only Neat Thing to Do" (N/A); 484. "My Summer Vacation (is Over)" (N/A); 485. "A Ten Year Introduction" (N/A); 486. "Give Me an Apple Watch" (N/A); 487. "Give Me a Free Trip. I Don't Care Where. I Just Want to Go Somewhere" (N/A); 488. "Buffets Are Filled with Dreams" (N/A); 489. "Cliches are Important" (N/A); 490. "I Felt Like Doing It, But It Was Meaningless" (N/A); 491. "Some People will Traverse a Steel Beam for 20 Million" (N/A)
46	September 18, 2015	978-4-09-126230-1	October 14, 2025	978-1-9747-2502-1
492. "It's a Cold Night, so Let's Get Wild" (N/A); 493. "I Want to Stay in a Suite Room" (N/A); 494. "The Wild Kingdom – The Real Jungle Cruise" (N/A); 495. "It is not the strong who win. The winners win." (N/A); 496. "Good Thing I Have a Spine" (N/A); 497. "Spicy Strategy in Colombia" (N/A); 498. "Tough Teacher" (N/A); 499. "Bruce Willis with Hair" (N/A); 500. "You can make another anime if you want." (N/A); 501. "Tonight, Banjou's Voice Will Signal the End of the Unending Battle" (N/A); 502. "Make Sure to Have a Plan" (N/A)
47	February 18, 2016	978-4-09-126498-5	February 10, 2026	978-1-97-472503-8
503. "A Demon Lives in Las Vegas" (N/A); 504. "This is a Story of Friendship" (N/A); 505. "Read this only after reading Chapter 1 of Ad Astra Per Aspera" (N/A); 506. "Older female relatives tend not to mind their own business" (N/A); 507. "Karakoi" (N/A); 508. "Even Tonegawa Would Hesitate" (N/A); 509. "On a three day two night trip to Paris, this manga's editor had the bad luck to have his wallet stolen on the first day, to be bedridden by a stomachache the next day, and to return home without doing anything the last day." (N/A); 510. "That's Why The Girl Loves" (N/A); 511. "The More I Drew, The Cuter Kananiwa-san Became." (N/A); 512. "I Want to Visit the Grand Canyon" (N/A); 513. "A Financial Lesson for Good Kids: Money is More Important than Your Life" (N/A)
48	May 18, 2016	978-4-09-127136-5	May 12, 2026	978-1-9747-1682-1
514 "Bring Everyone's Hearts Together (With Money)" (N/A); 515 "Rules are a Broad Thing" (N/A); 516 "Nishizawa Ayumu's Normal Days" (N/A); 517 "Saki-san's Bar Wandering" (N/A); 518 "I Know the Trick to Being Ill" (N/A); 519 "Too Vast a Fortune" (N/A); 520 "In Life, You Sometimes Just Need a Drink" (N/A); 521 "The End of a Long Journey" (N/A); 522 "The Ideal and Reality are different, but you want to get as close to the Ideal as you can" (N/A); 523 "Inherit The Stars" (N/A); 524 "Kiss of Murder" (N/A)
49	October 18, 2016	978-4-09-127406-9	September 8, 2026	978-1-9747-2505-2
50	February 17, 2017	978-4-09-127502-8	January 12, 2027	978-1-9747-2504-5
51	June 16, 2017	978-4-09-127571-4	—	—
52	June 16, 2017	978-4-09-159246-0	—	—
