= List of Nodame Cantabile chapters =

The Nodame Cantabile manga was written and illustrated by Tomoko Ninomiya. It was serialized by Kodansha in the biweekly josei (aimed at younger adult women) manga magazine Kiss from 10 July 2001 to 10 October 2009. The untitled chapters have been collected in 23 tankōbon volumes. It is licensed in North America by Del Rey Manga, in France by Pika Édition, in South Korea by Daiwon C.I., in Thailand by NED Comics, in Indonesia by Elex Media Komputindo, and in Taiwan by Tong Li Comics. All volume covers feature Nodame with a musical instrument.

Starting in May 2008, Japanese serialization changed from biweekly to monthly because of Ninomiya's pregnancy. Serialization went on hiatus starting October 2008 following the birth of her son and Ninomiya's subsequent diagnosis of having carpal tunnel syndrome, but resumed again with the 10 March 2009 issue of Kiss on an irregular schedule depending on her continued recovery. In June 2009, the series went on hiatus again when Ninomiya was hospitalized with acute appendicitis, and resumed serialization in the 25 July issue. In July 2009, Asahi Shimbun reported that the manga was scheduled to end in the spring of 2010, coinciding with the release of the final live-action movie. However, the series ended with chapter 136 in the 10 October 2009 issue of the magazine.

A short series, titled Nodame Cantabile: Encore Opera Chapter, was serialized in the same magazine from 10 December 2009 to 25 August 2010.

== Volume list ==
No.	Original release date	Original ISBN	North America release date	North America ISBN
1	11 January 2002	978-4-06-325968-1	26 April 2005	978-0-345-48172-6
Chapters 1–6
Popular piano student Shinichi Chiaki has almost given up his dream of becoming a conductor because his international career prospects are crippled by his fear of flying, and his despair affects his playing. His life drastically changes upon encountering his eccentric and frighteningly messy neighbour, Megumi "Nodame" Noda, who plays piano in a beautiful cantabile style. When they are assigned to play a Mozart sonata for two pianos together, Chiaki reluctantly helps Nodame memorize the score to compensate for her bad sight reading and finds himself encouraged by Nodame's joy in music to resume his dream of becoming a conductor. However, he is dismayed to find that Nodame has fallen in love with him, and expresses her love in an unusual manner. When Mine, an unconventional violinist who loves rock music, tries to help her win over Chiaki, Chiaki winds up helping Mine pass a critical exam, after which Mine decides to dedicate himself to classical music.
2	12 April 2002	978-4-06-325982-7	26 July 2005	978-0-345-48173-3
Chapters 7–12
3	9 August 2002	978-4-06-325993-3	29 November 2005	978-0-345-48174-0
Chapters 13–18
4	13 December 2002	978-4-06-340411-1	31 January 2006	978-0-345-48241-9
Chapters 19–23; Sidestory: Rika-chan-sensei's Fun Baieru
5	13 March 2003	978-4-06-340423-4	25 April 2006	978-0-345-48269-3
Chapters 24–28; Sidestory:
6	11 July 2003	978-4-06-340438-8	25 July 2006	978-0-345-48368-3
Chapters 29–34
7	10 October 2003	978-4-06-340451-7	13 October 2006	978-0-345-48369-0
Chapters 35–40
8	12 March 2004	978-4-06-340476-0	30 January 2007	978-0-345-48531-1
Chapters 41–46
9	11 June 2004	978-4-06-340488-3	1 May 2007	978-0-345-49397-2
Chapters 47–52
10	13 September 2004	978-4-06-340505-7	31 July 2007	978-0-345-49398-9
Prelude; Chapters 53–58
11	13 January 2005	978-4-06-340523-1	30 October 2007	978-0-345-49399-6
Chapters 59–64
12	13 May 2005	978-4-06-340544-6	18 March 2008	978-0-345-49400-9
Chapters 65–70
13	13 September 2005	978-4-06-340560-6	6 May 2008	978-0-345-49914-1
Chapters 71–76
14	13 January 2006	978-4-06-340575-0	24 June 2008	978-0-345-50331-2
Chapters 77–82
15	13 June 2006	978-4-06-340594-1	4 November 2008	978-0-345-50332-9
Chapters 83–88
16	13 October 2006	978-4-06-340613-9	28 July 2009	978-0-345-50523-1
Chapters 89–94
17	12 February 2007	978-4-06-340632-0	28 February 2017 (digital)	978-1-682-33404-1
Chapters 95–100
18	13 June 2007	978-4-06-340648-1	25 April 2017 (digital)	978-1-682-33633-5
Chapters 101–106
19	13 November 2007	978-4-06-340673-3	23 May 2017 (digital)	978-1-682-33648-9
Chapters 107–112
20	13 March 2008	978-4-06-340691-7	30 May 2017 (digital)	978-1-682-33659-5
Chapters 113–118
21	11 August 2008	978-4-06-340712-9	6 June 2017 (digital)	978-1-682-33660-1
Chapters 119–124
22	10 August 2009	978-4-06-340749-5	13 June 2017 (digital)	978-1-682-33661-8
Chapters 125–130
23	27 November 2009	978-4-06-340773-0	20 June 2017 (digital)	978-1-682-33662-5
Chapters 131–136

The short sequel series Nodame Cantabile: Encore Opera Chapter was published in two volumes. The numbering of the volumes follows the original series and so, begins at volume 24.

No.	Original release date	Original ISBN	North America release date	North America ISBN
24	26 April 2010	978-4-06-340795-2	27 June 2017 (digital)	978-1-682-33700-4
Chapters 137–143
Chiaki and Nodame finally return to Japan. Nodame prepares for a solo concert while Chiaki works with Mine and Suganuma to put produce an opera accompanied by the Rising Star Orchestra. Familiar faces return and new faces arrive to participate. But with a tight budget, constant bickering during rehearsals, and the stuffy heat of summer... can R☆S and the White Rose Troupe put on a successful performance?
25	13 December 2010	978-4-06-340826-3	27 June 2017 (digital)	978-1-682-33701-1
Chapters 144–146
